= List of paintings by John Constable =

List of paintings by the British artist John Constable

This is an incomplete list of the paintings of John Constable (11 June 1776 – 31 March 1837), an artist of the Romanticism, famous for his rural scenes.

== Timeline ==
- 1776–1809 Early Years
- 1809–1816 Early Maturity
- 1817–1828 Established Londoner
- 1829-1837 Late Years

== Paintings by Constable ==
This list includes paintings attributed to Constable.

In substitute of specific knowledge on the date of a painting's creation (in cases where this is not known), the year of exhibition has been put, is it would likely correlate. The circa date may also be put.

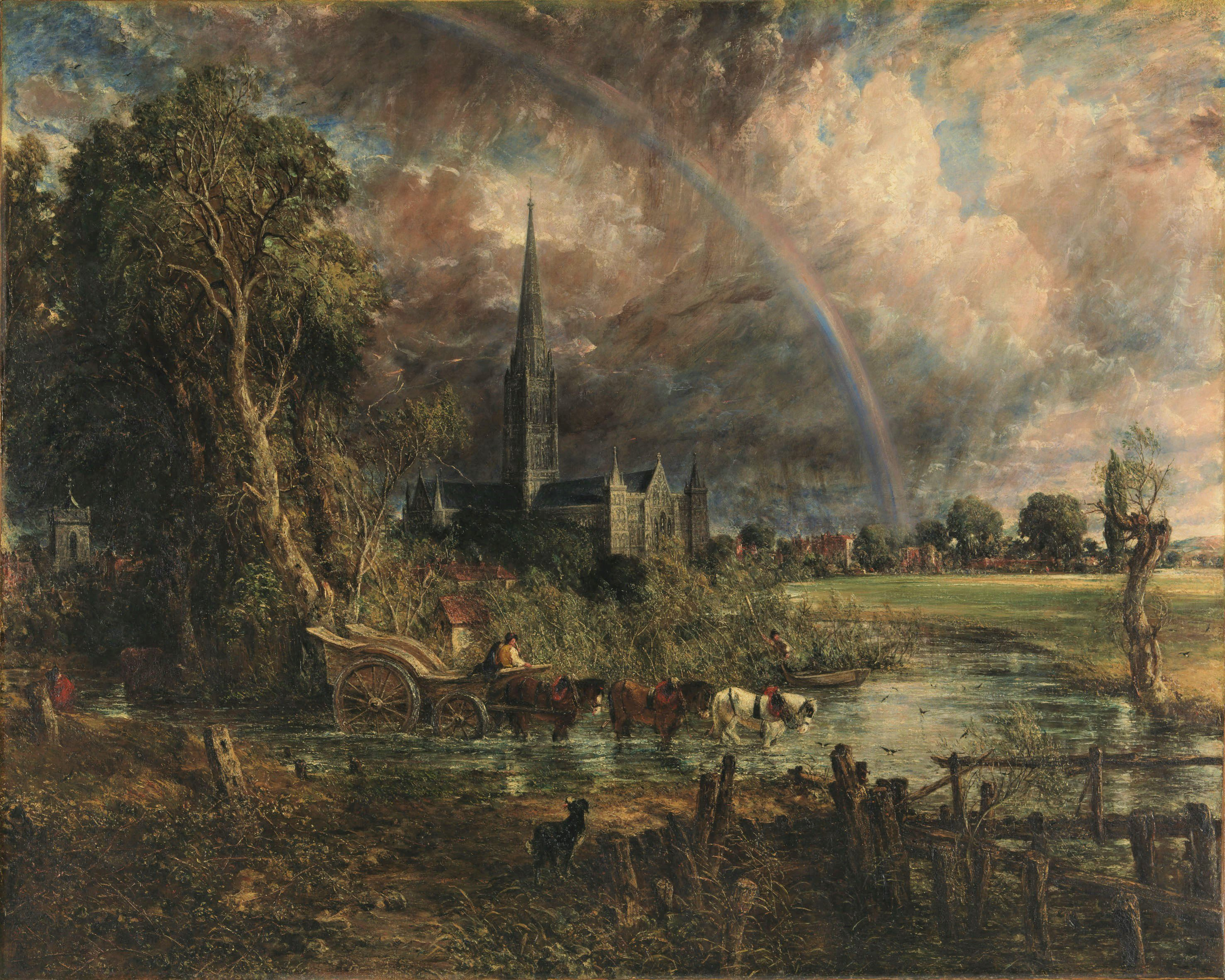
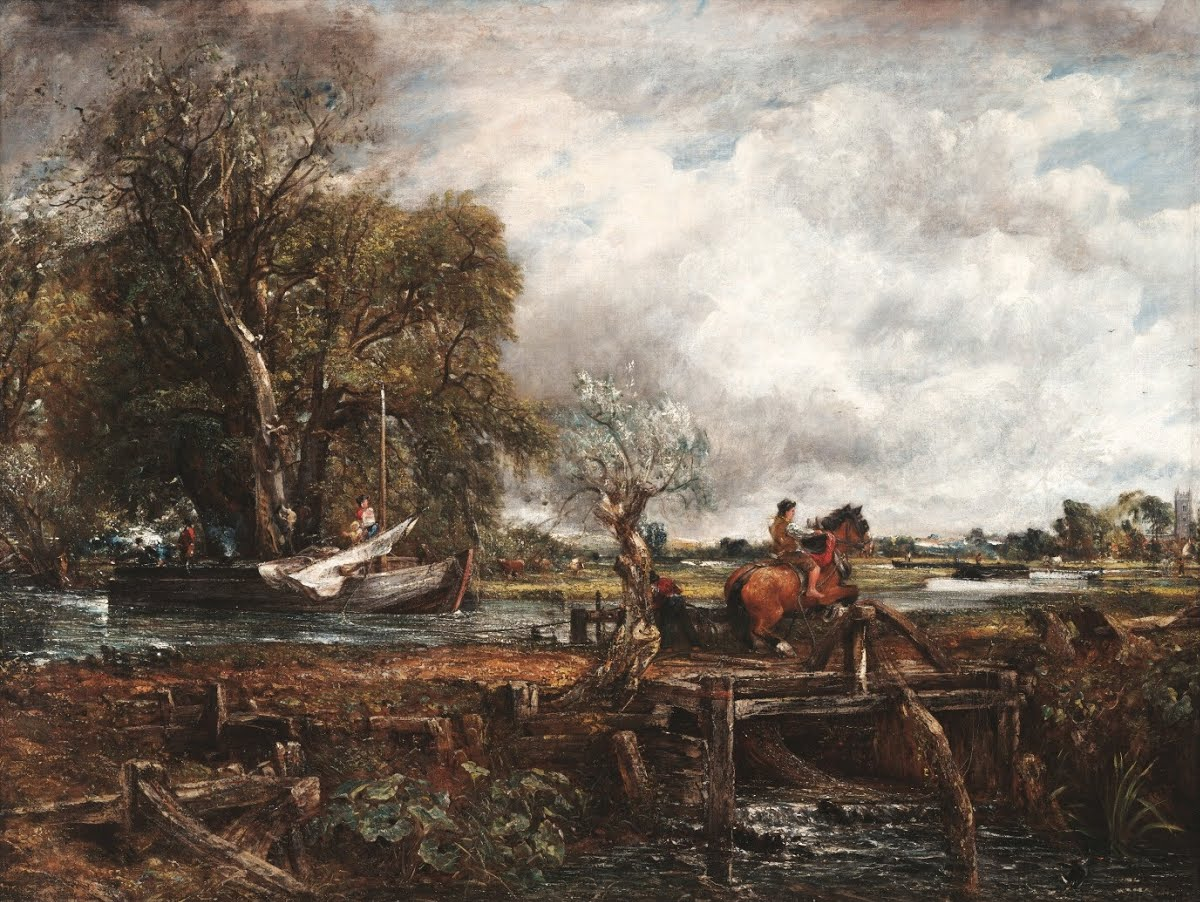
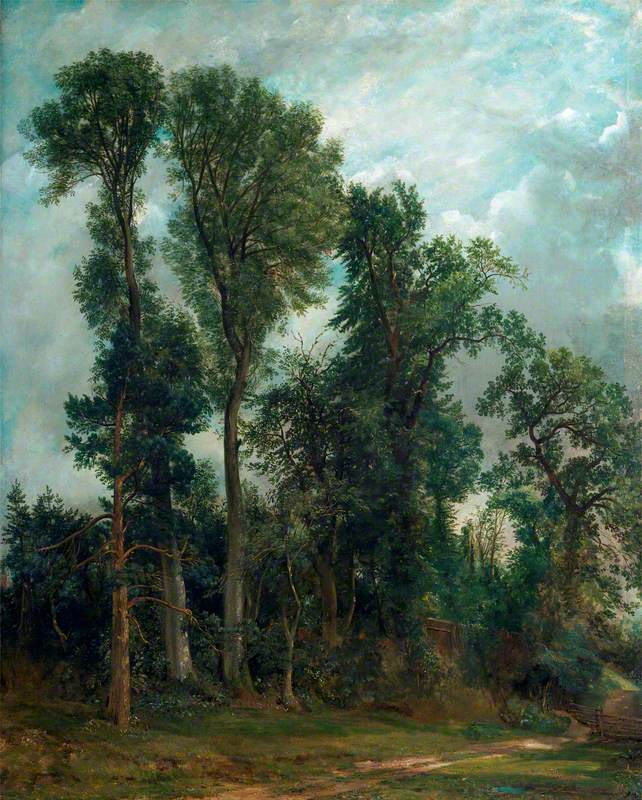
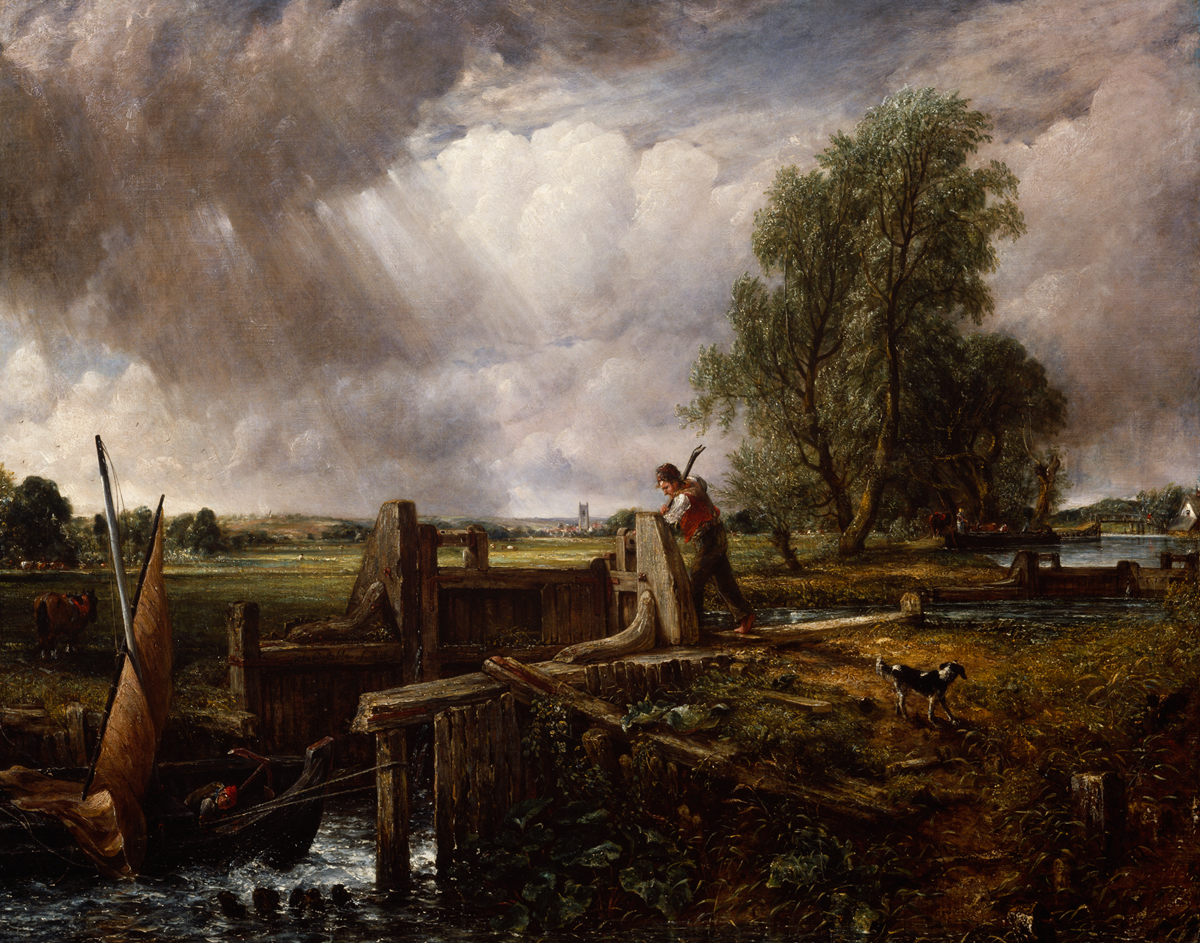
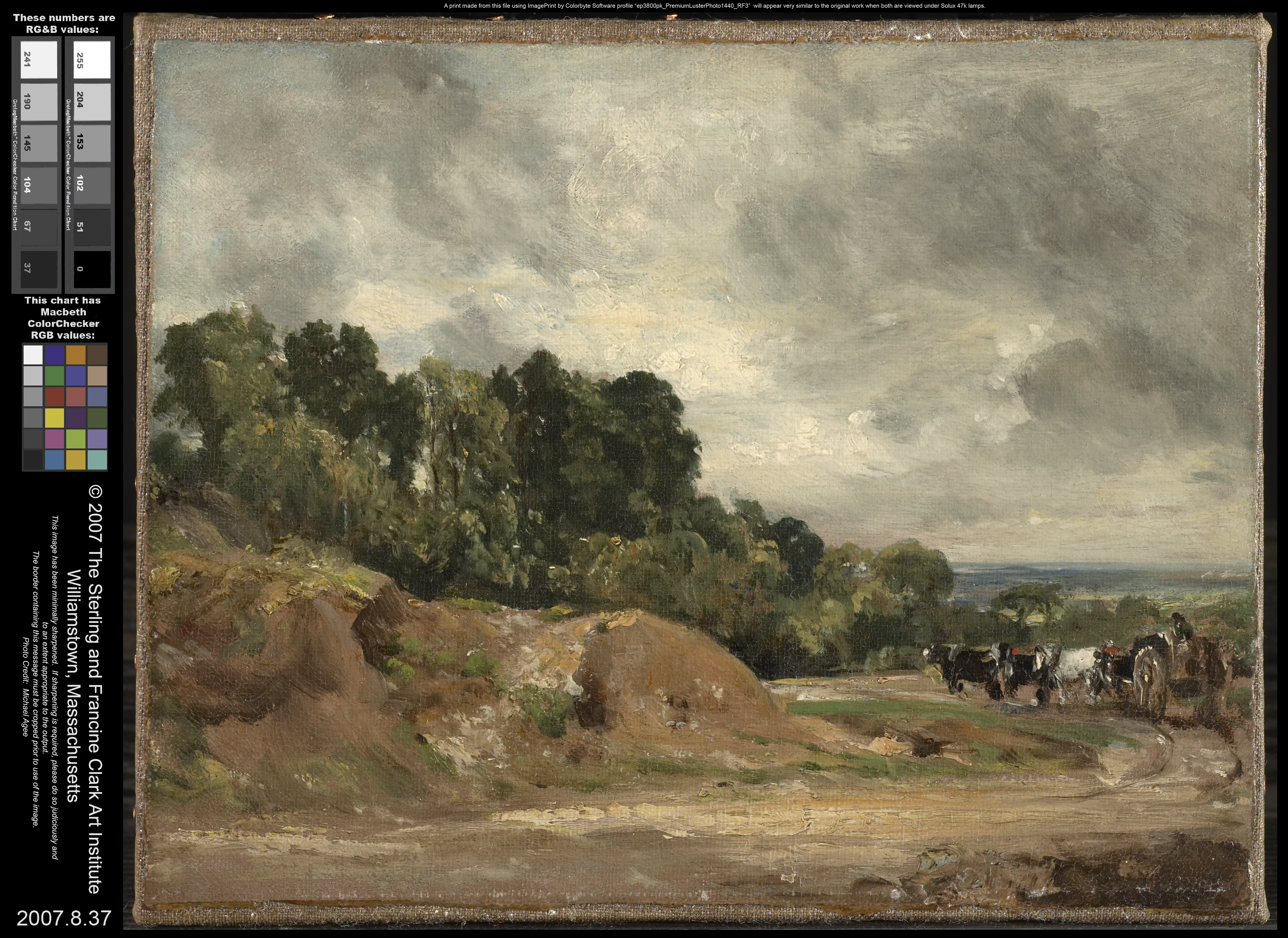
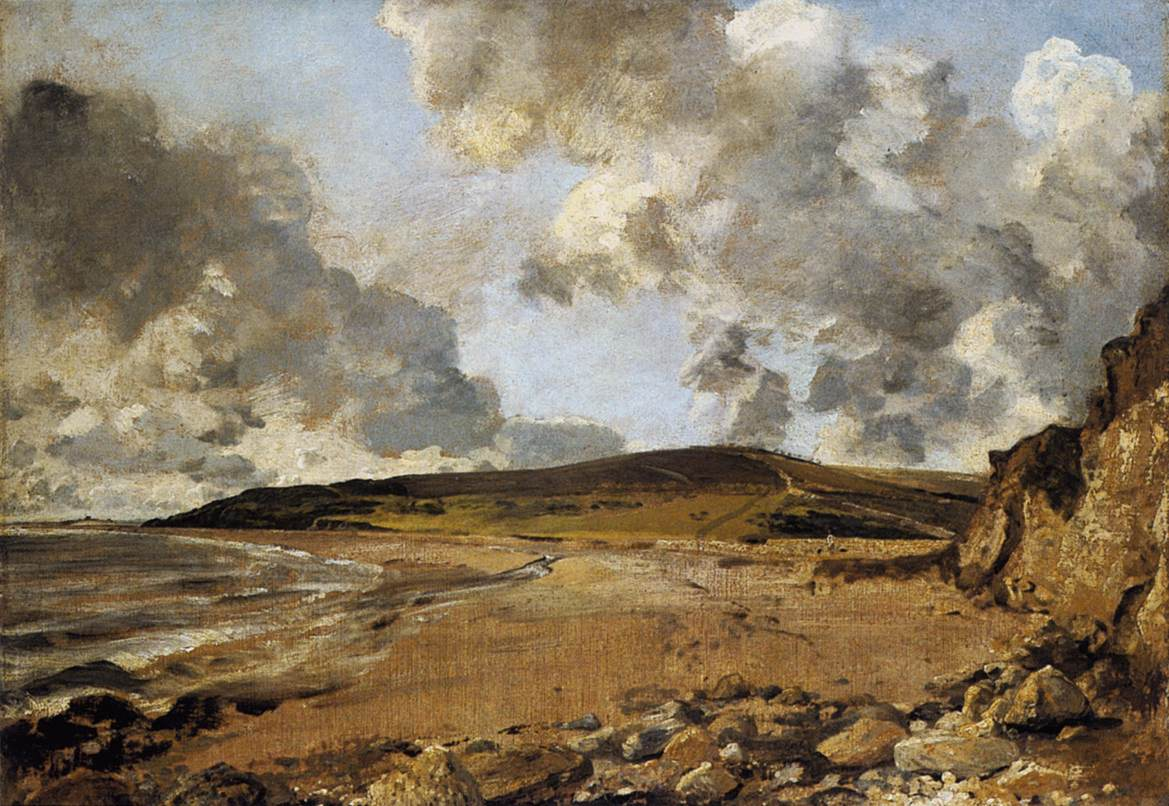
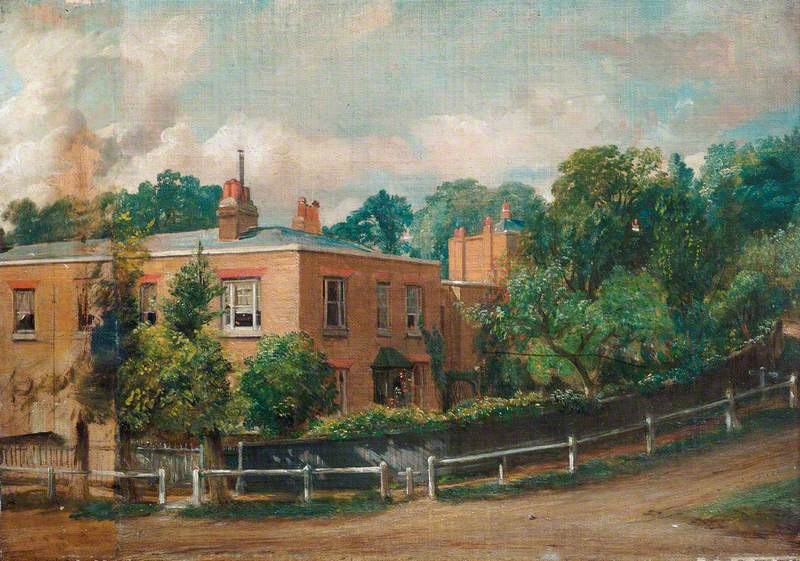
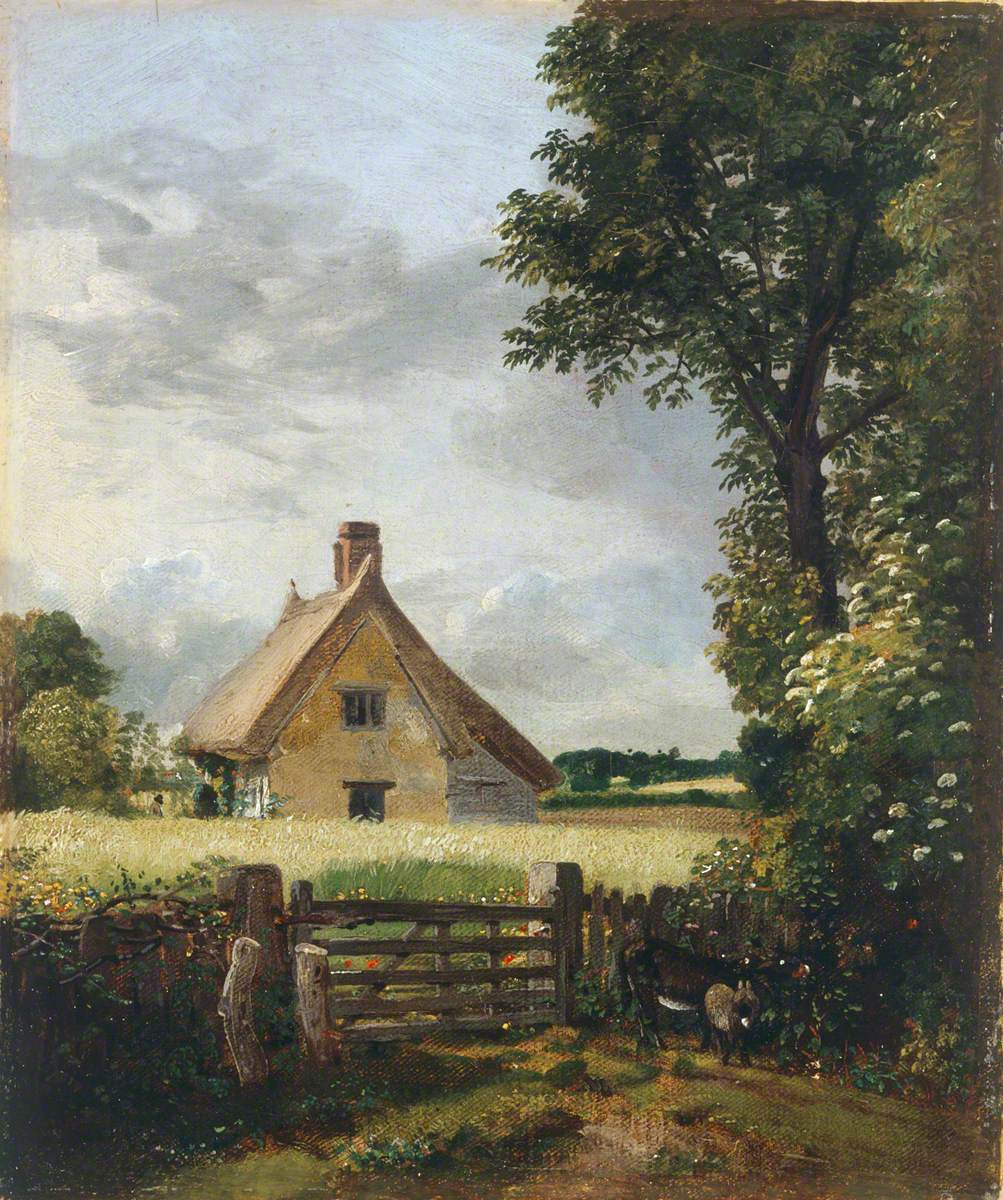
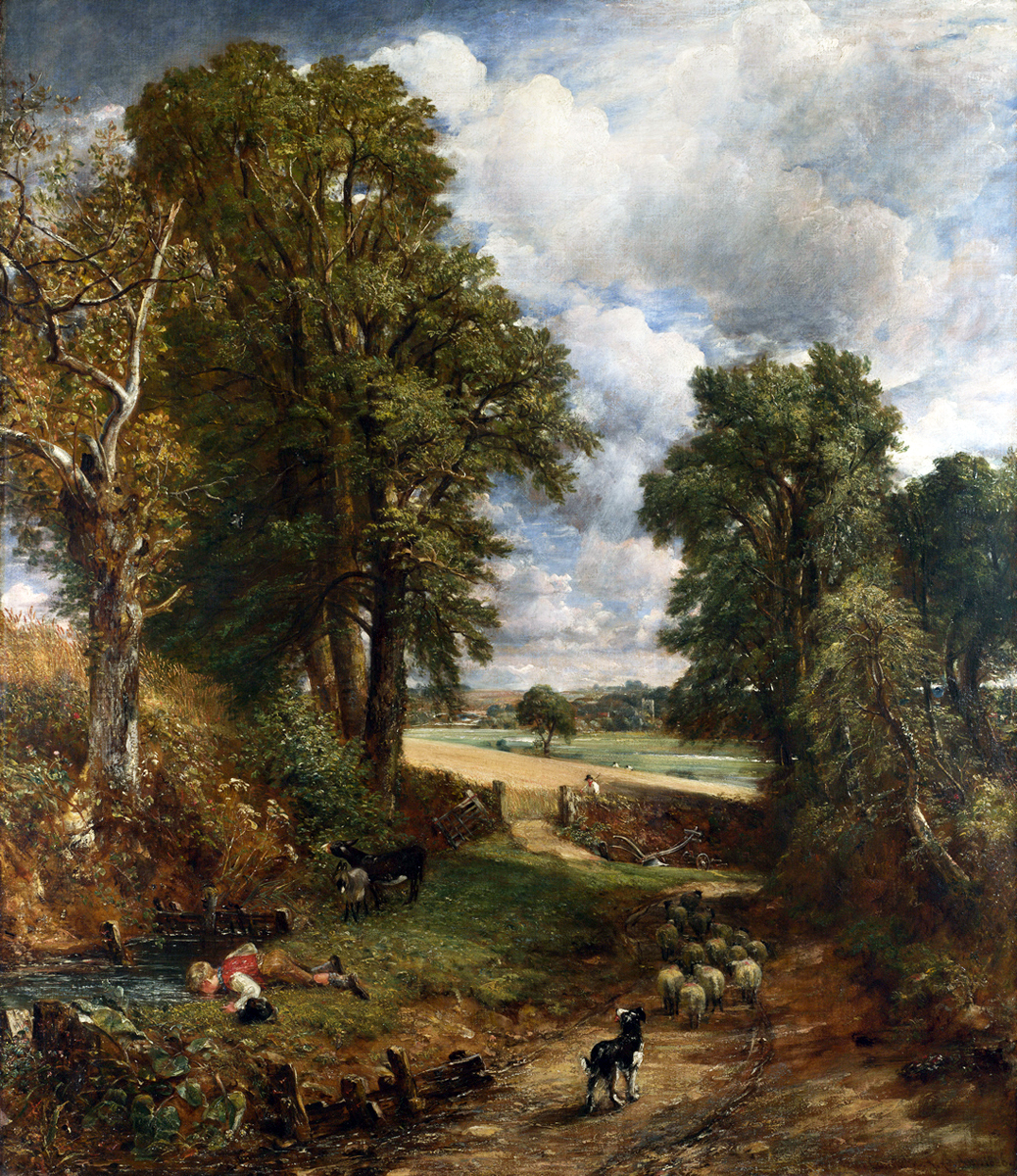
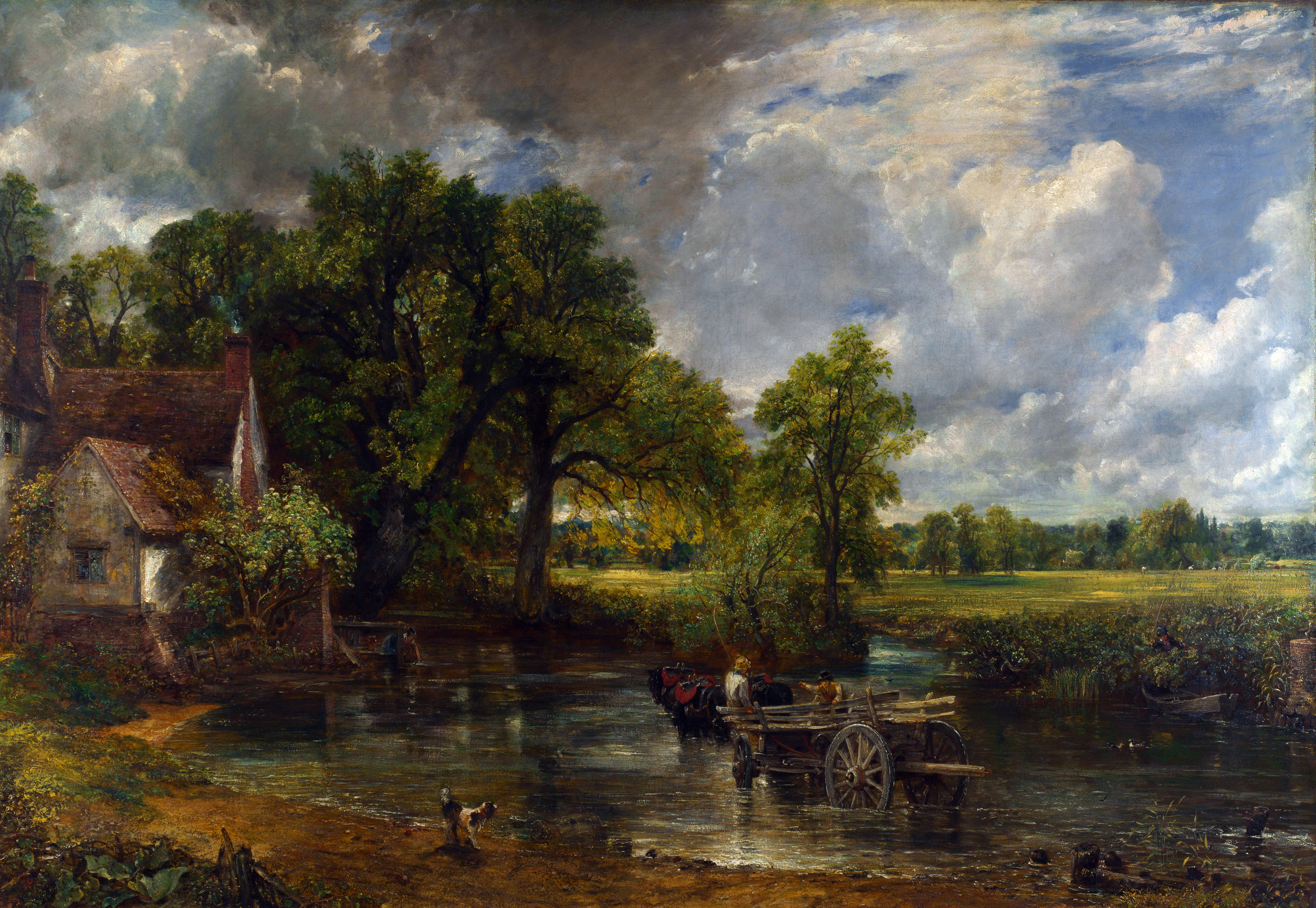
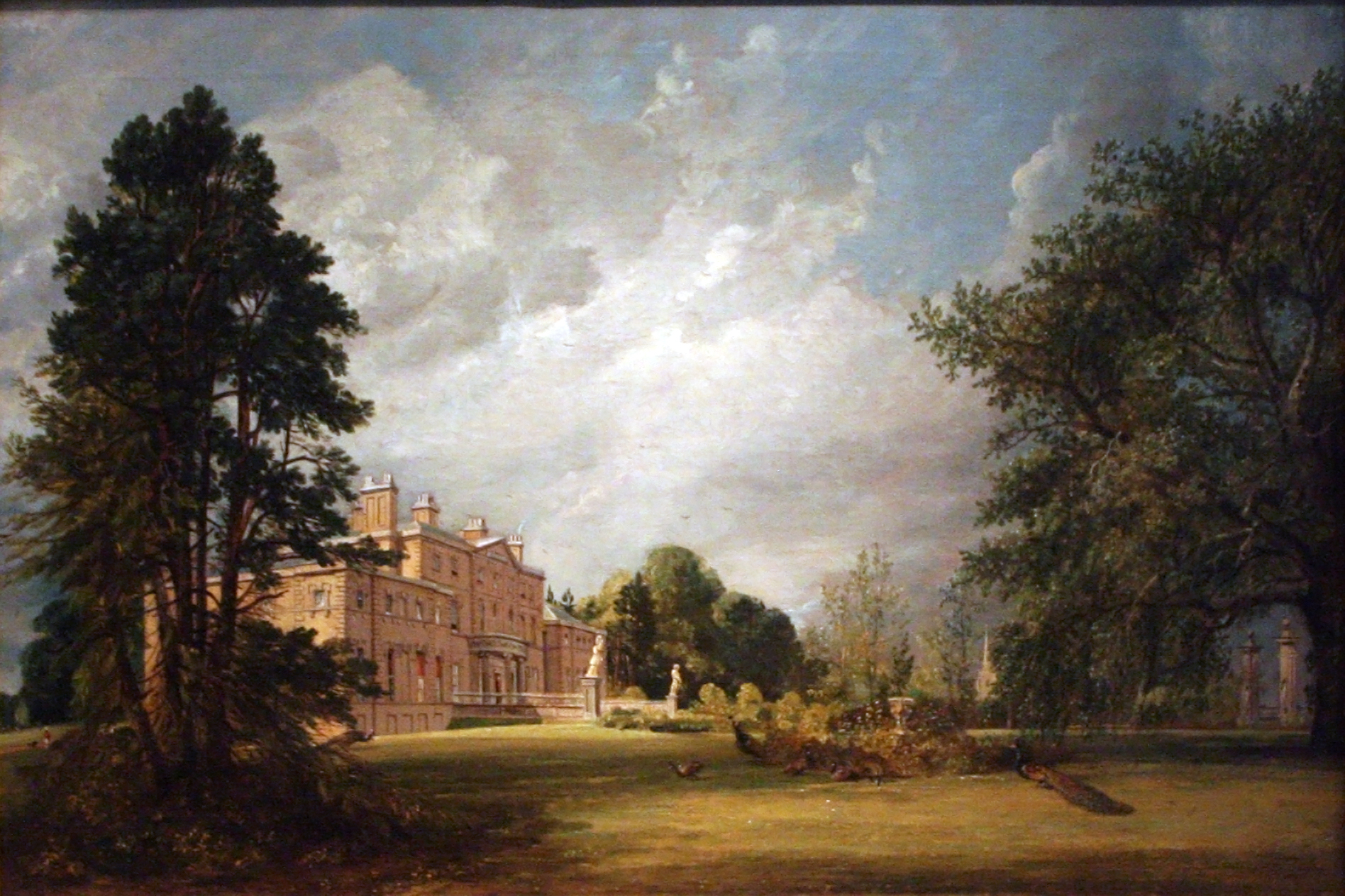
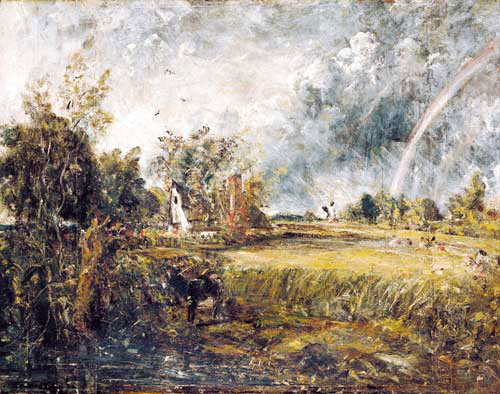
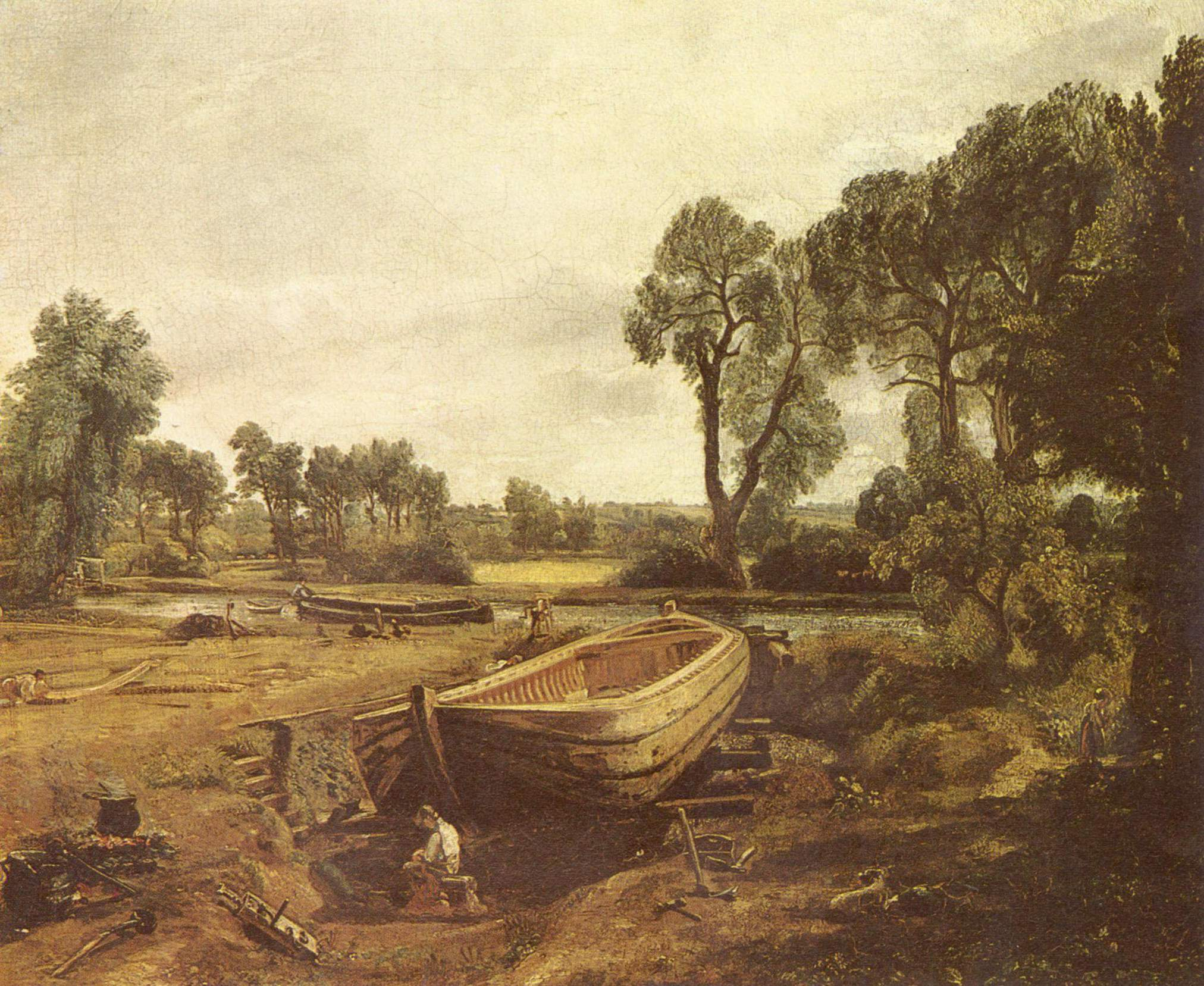
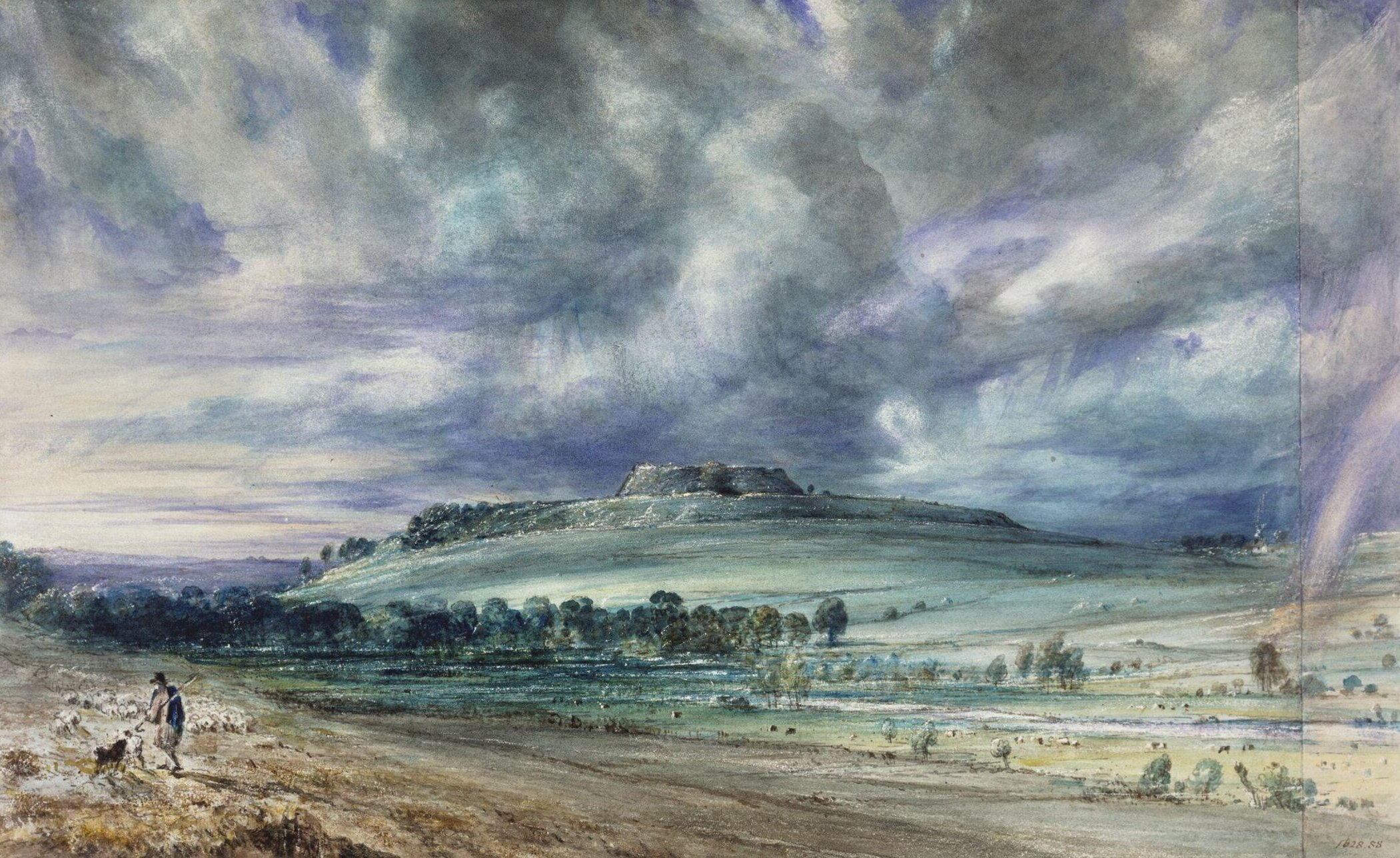
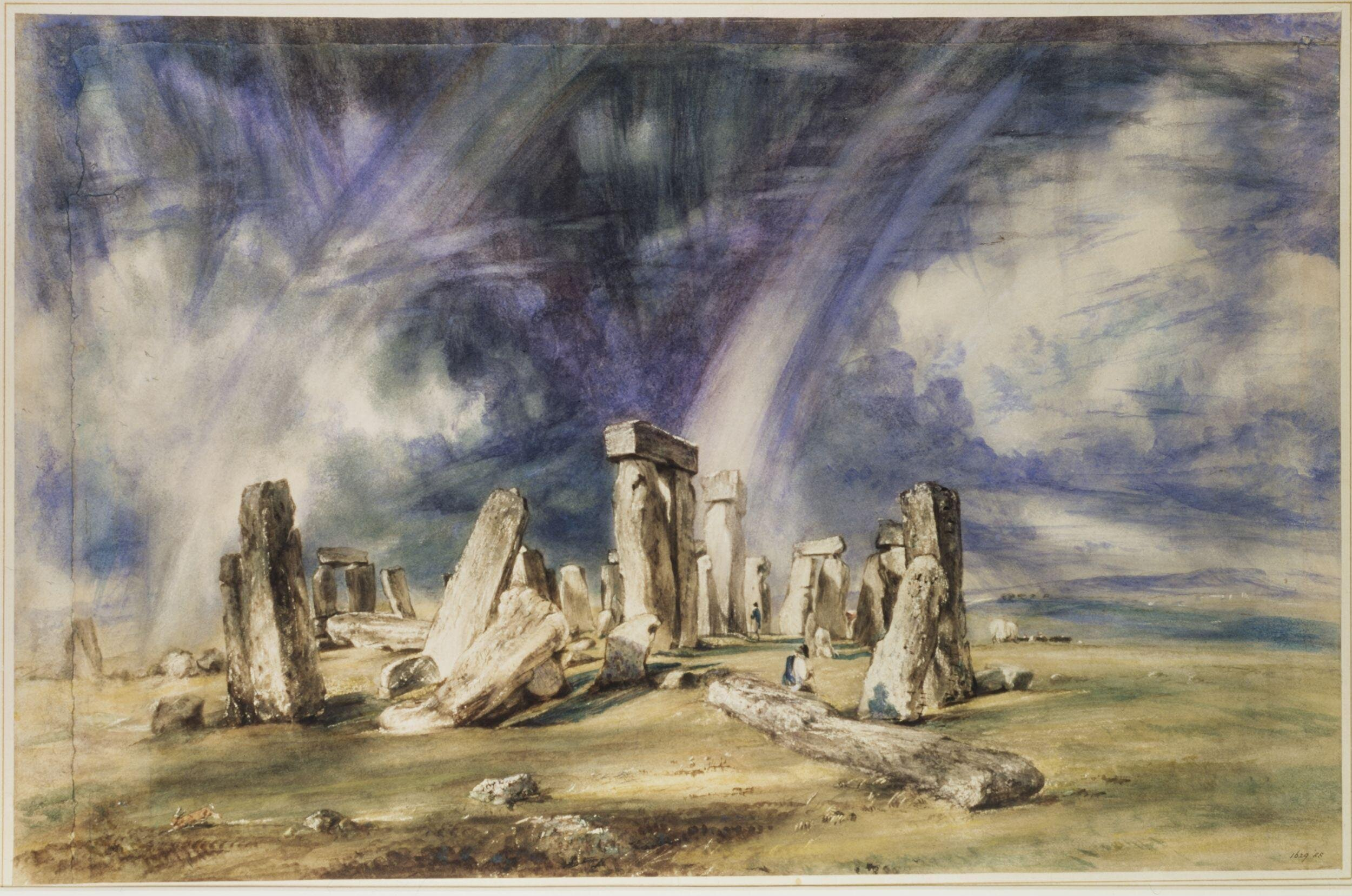
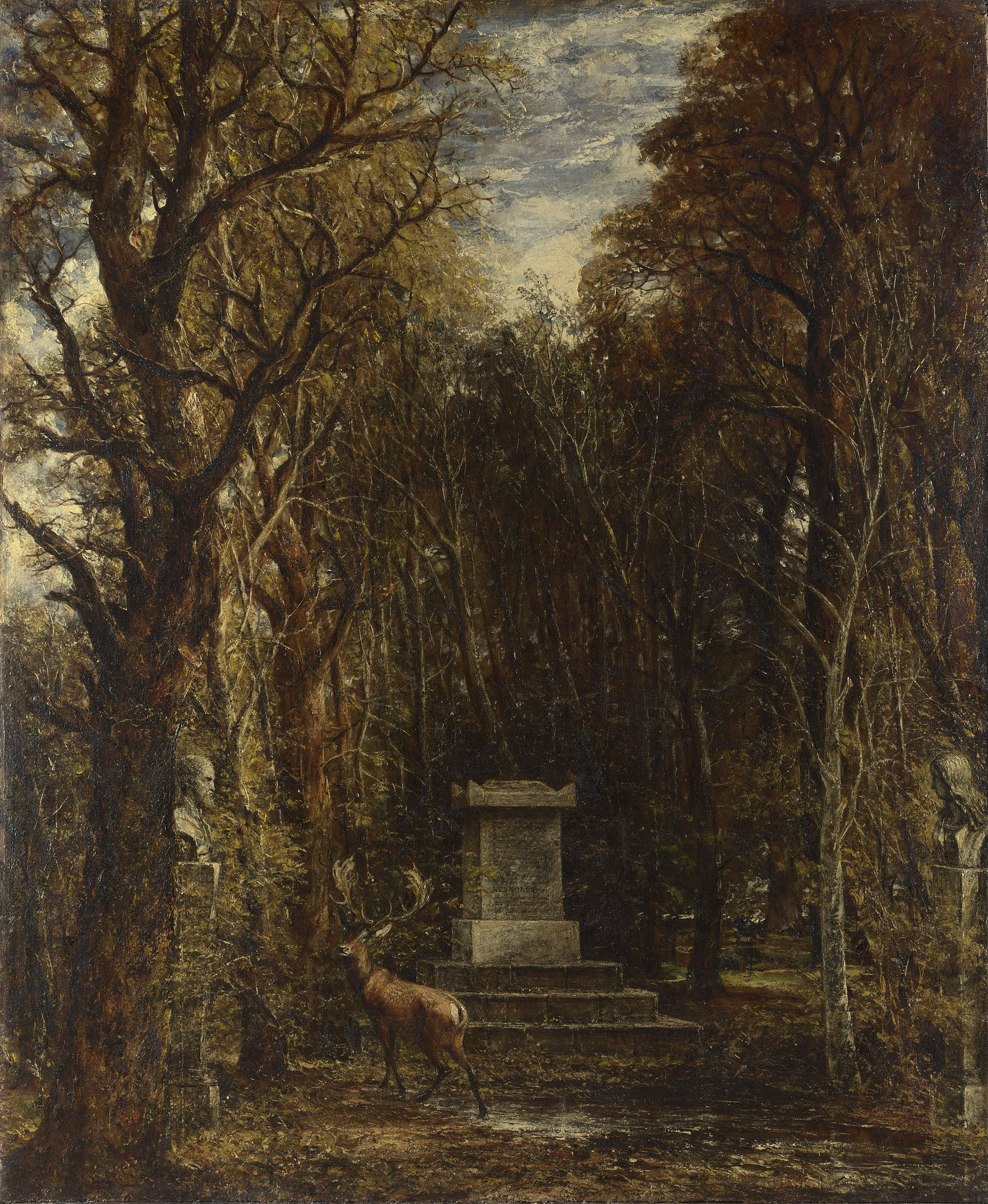
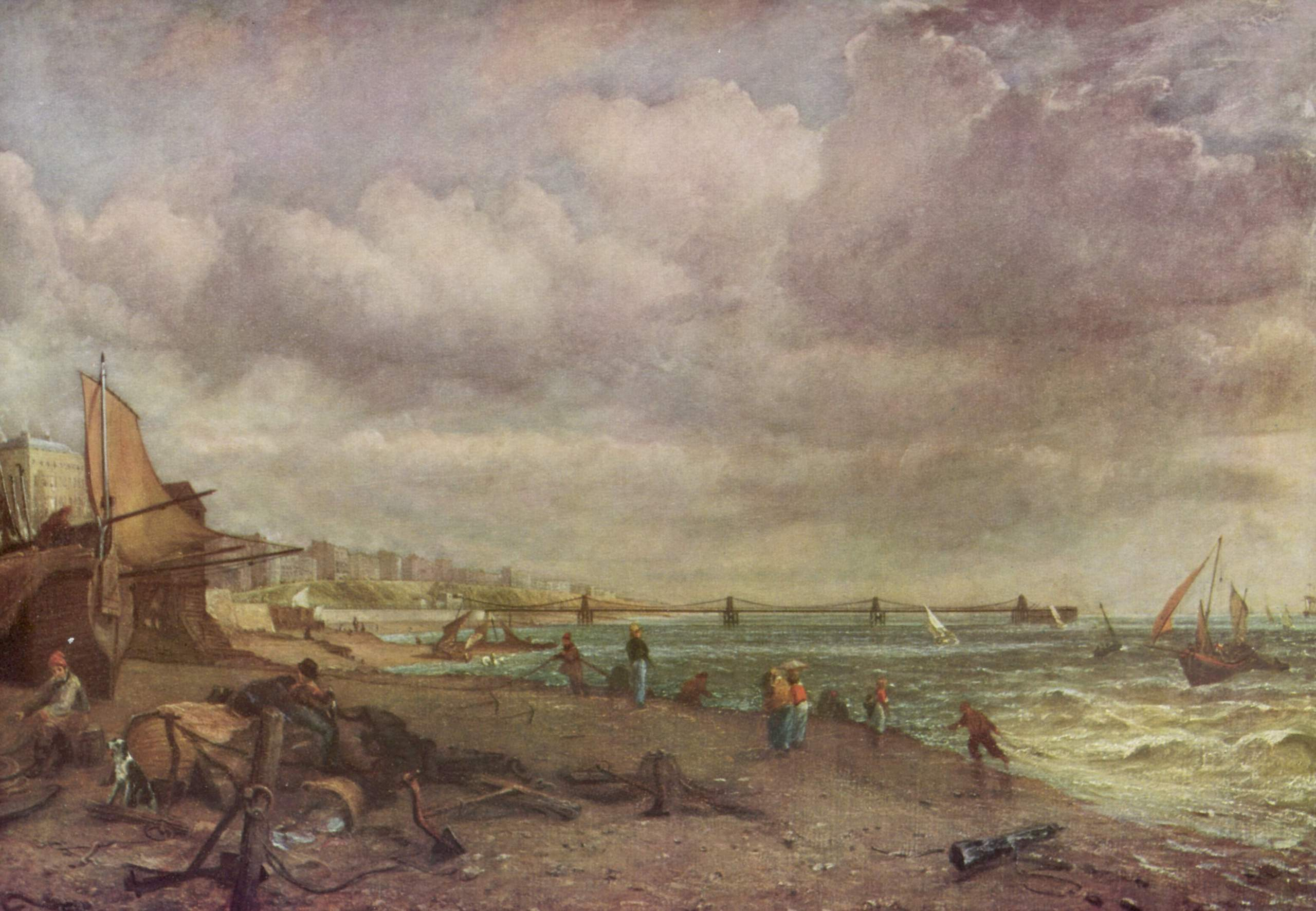
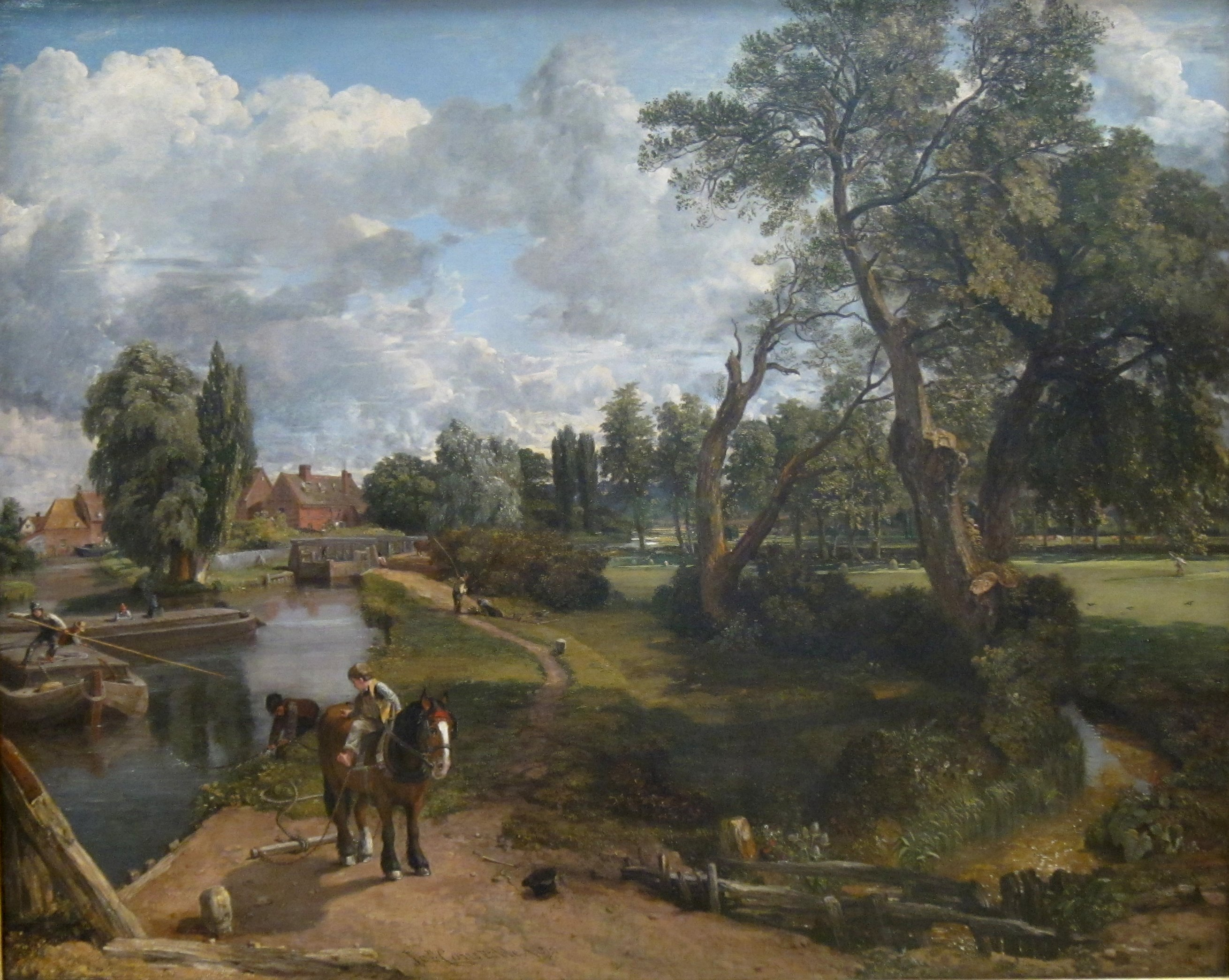
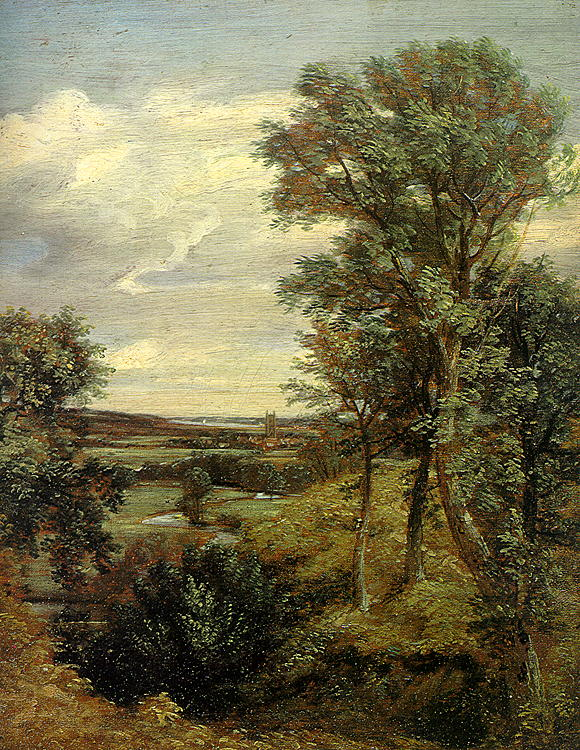
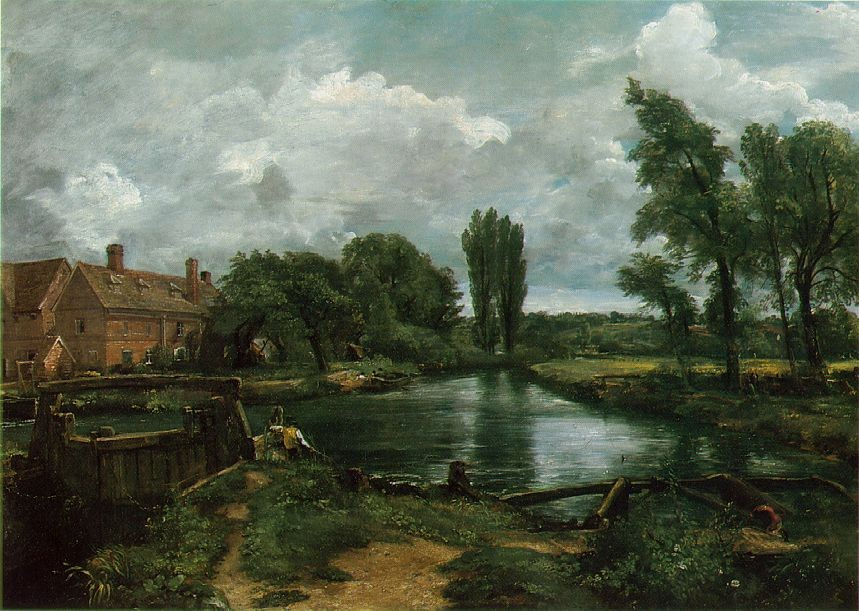
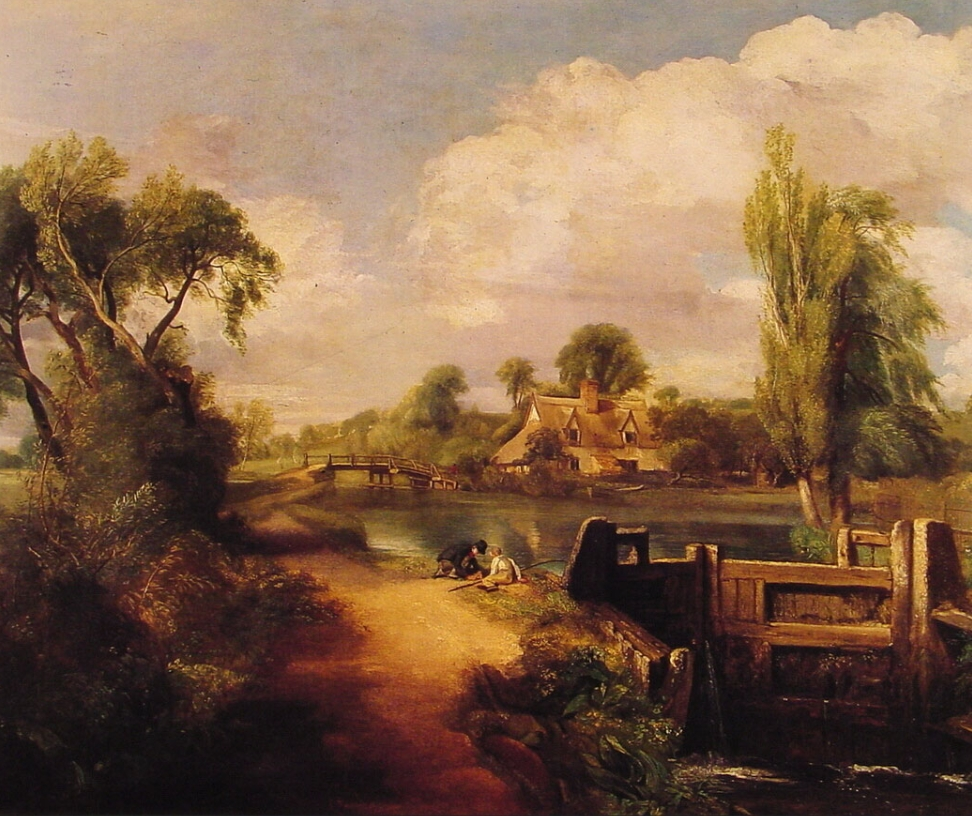
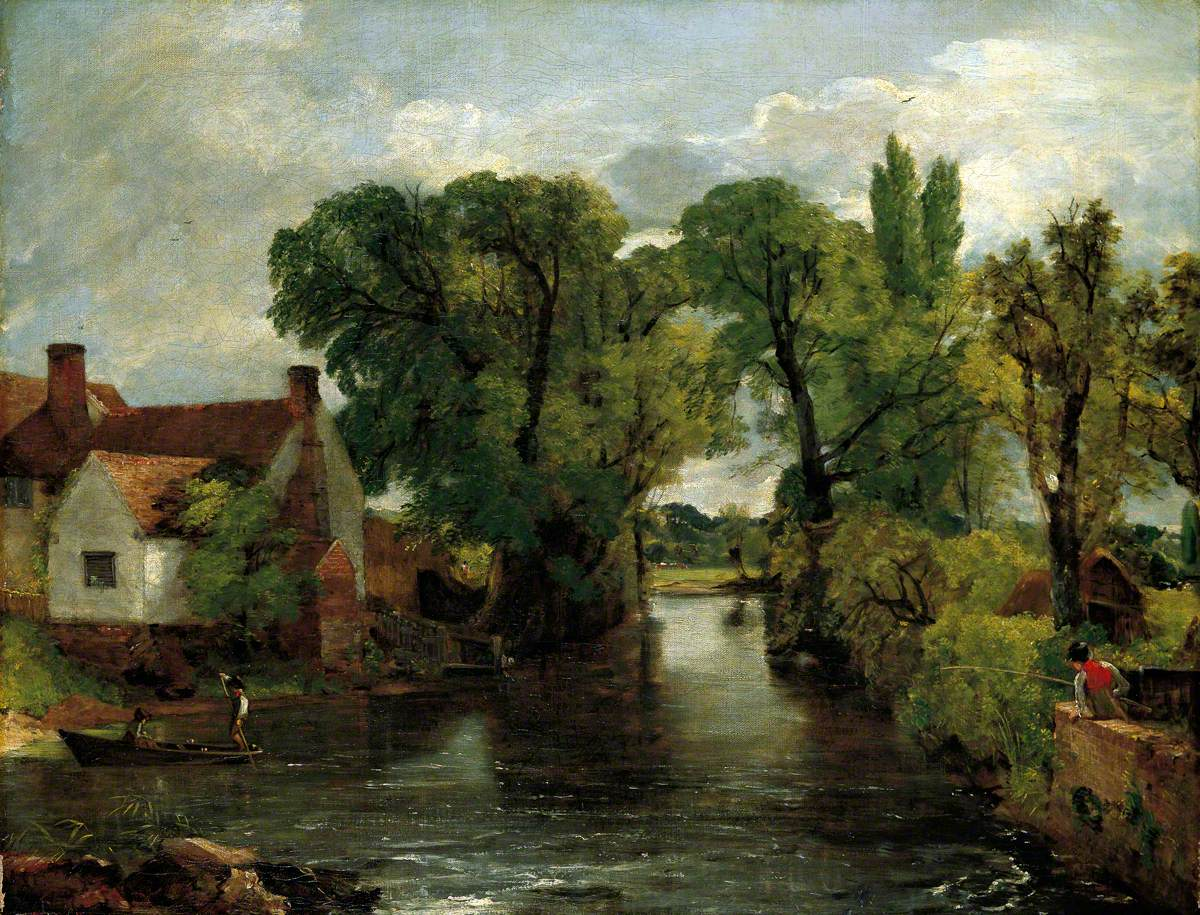
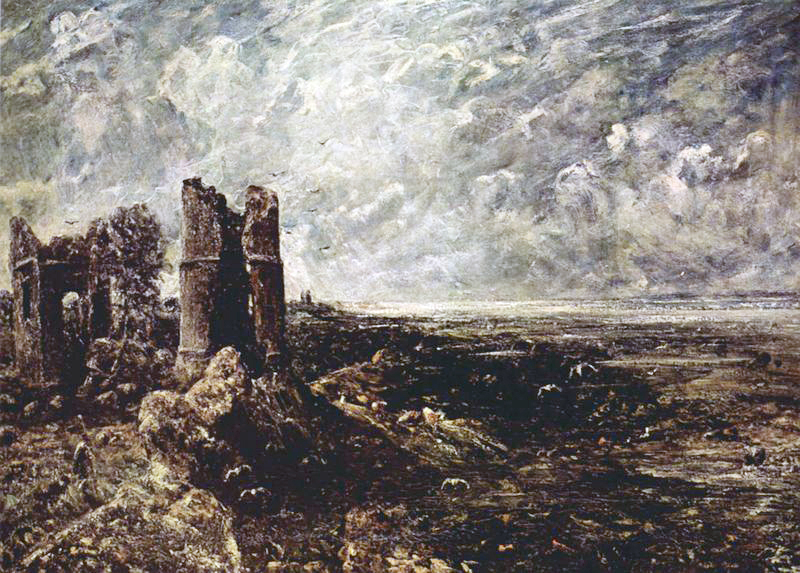
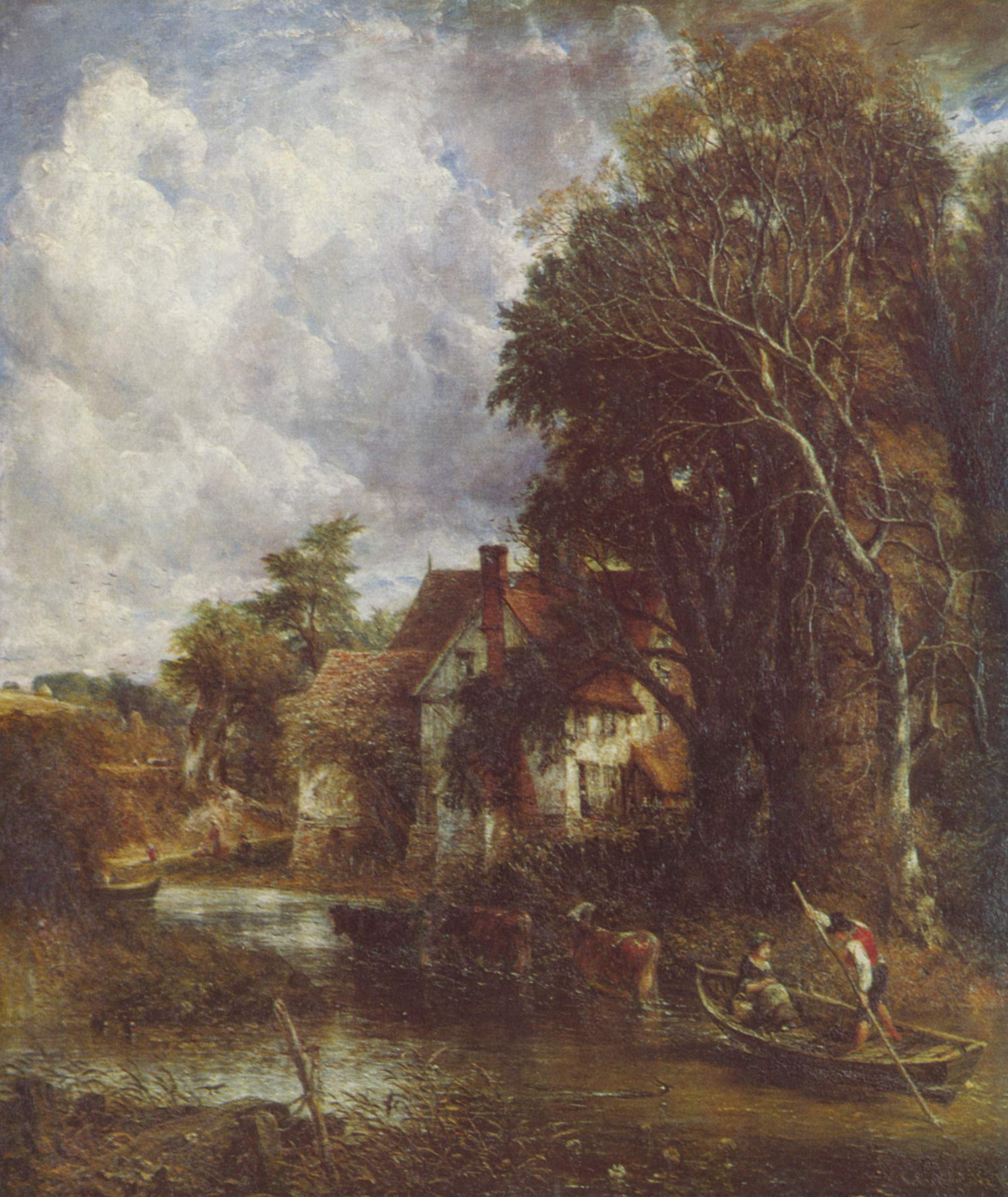
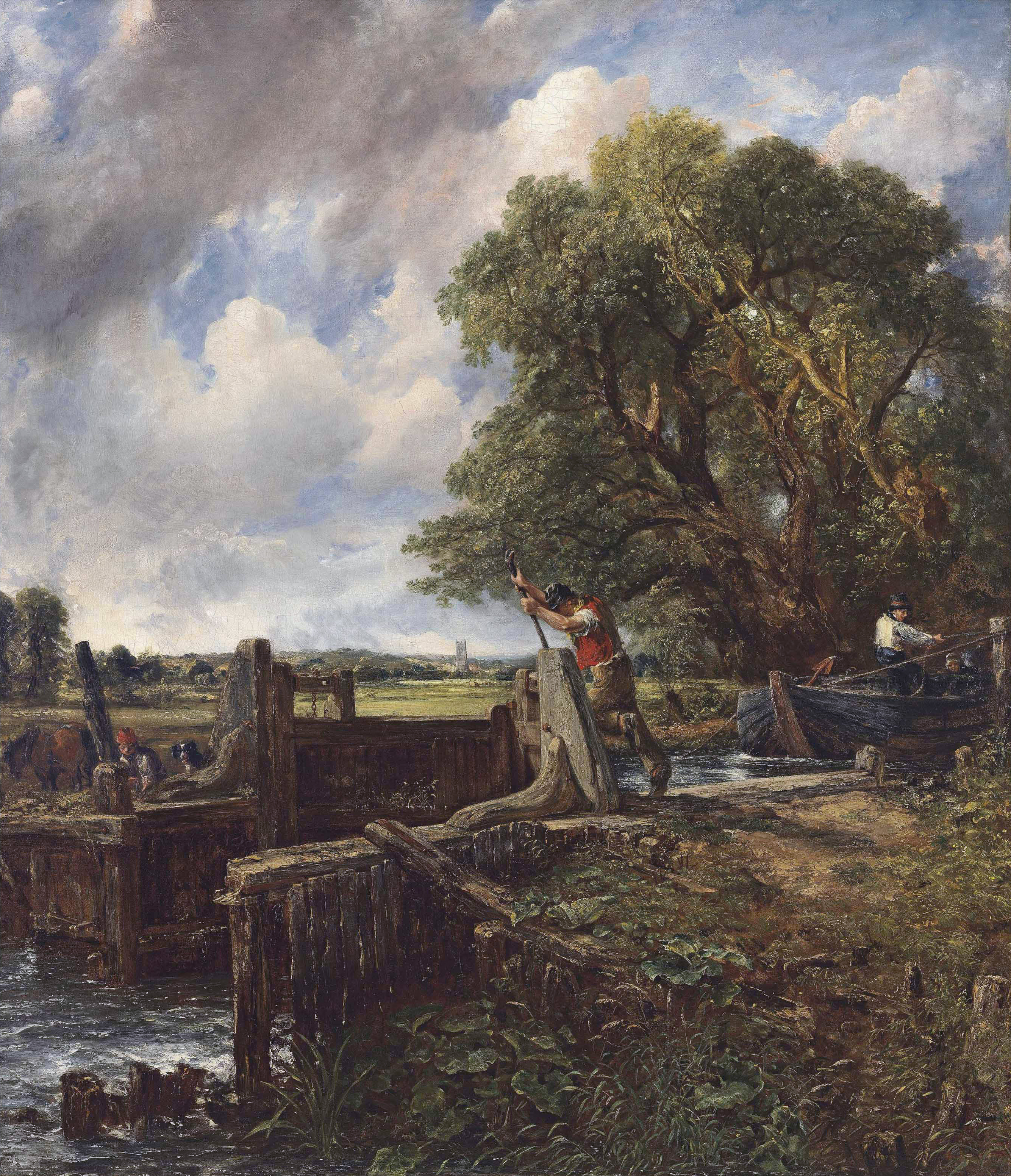
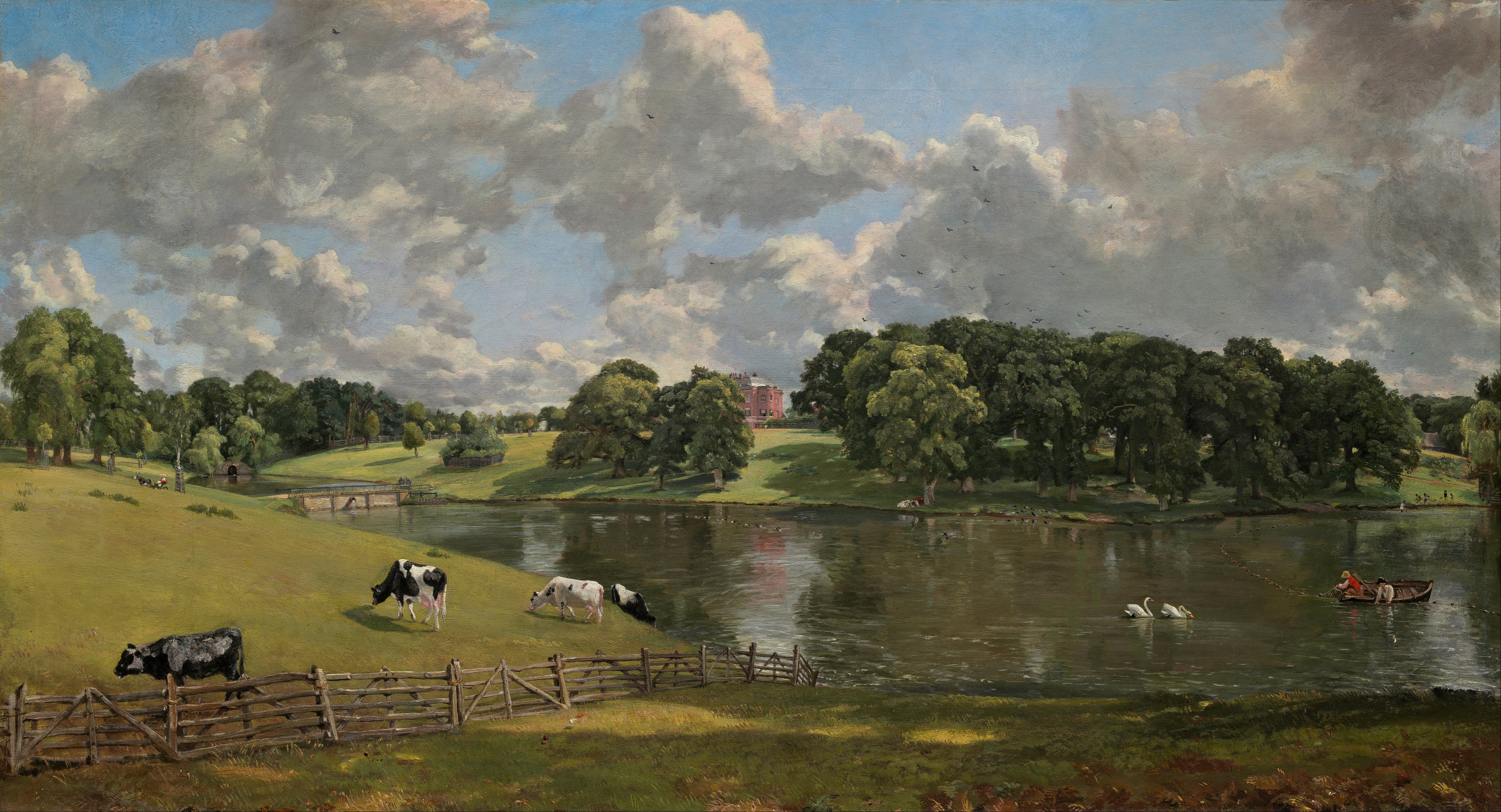
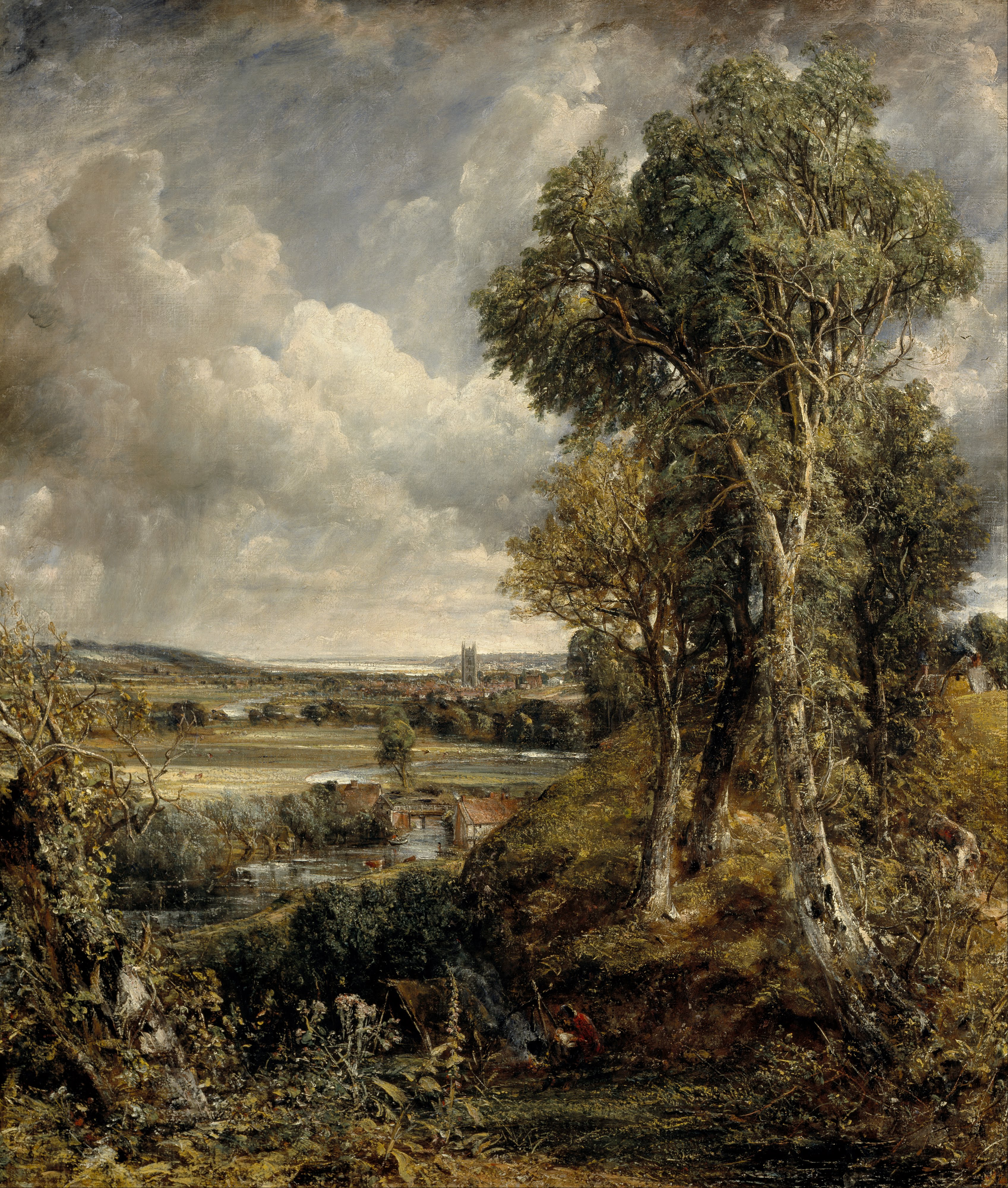
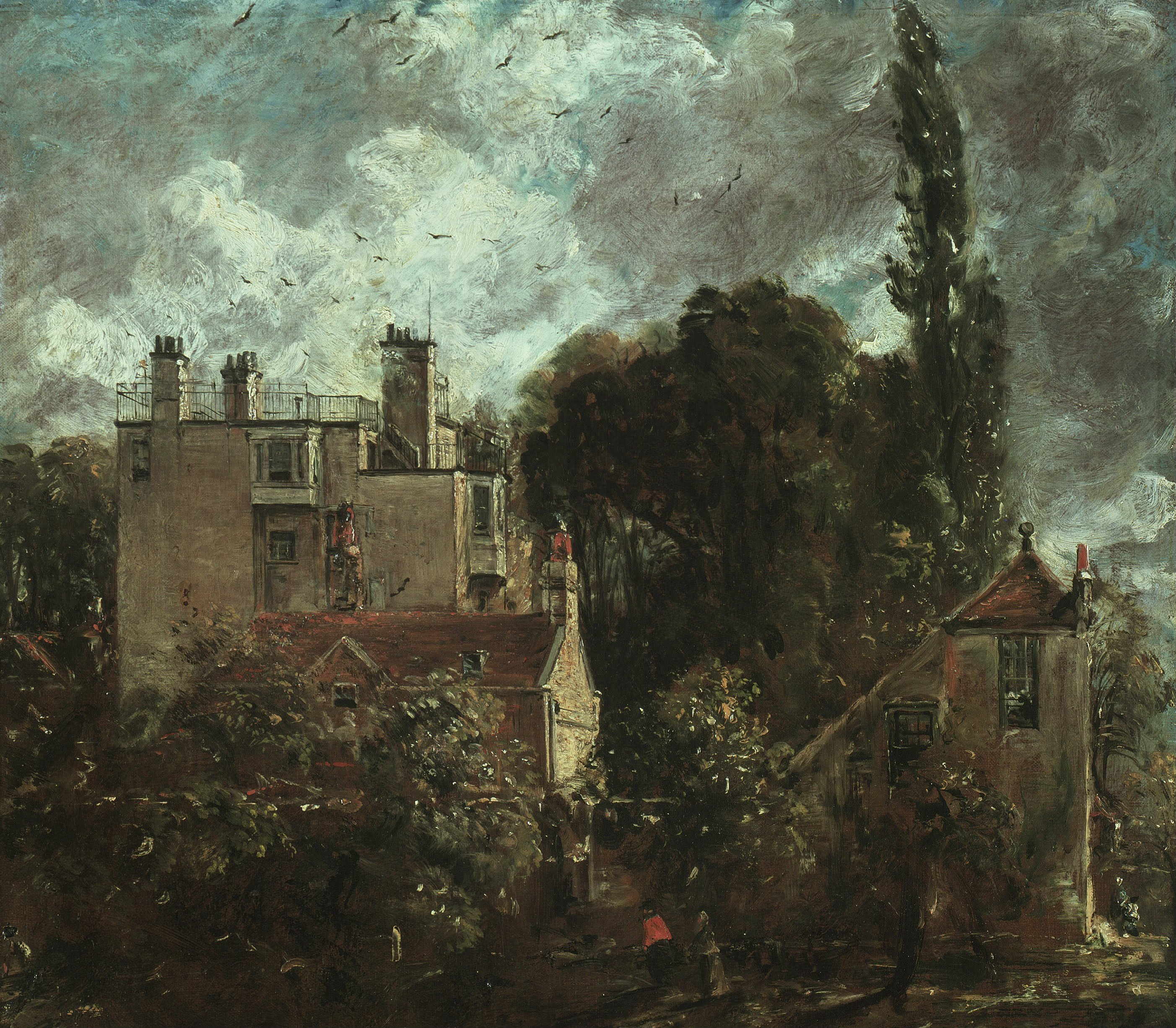
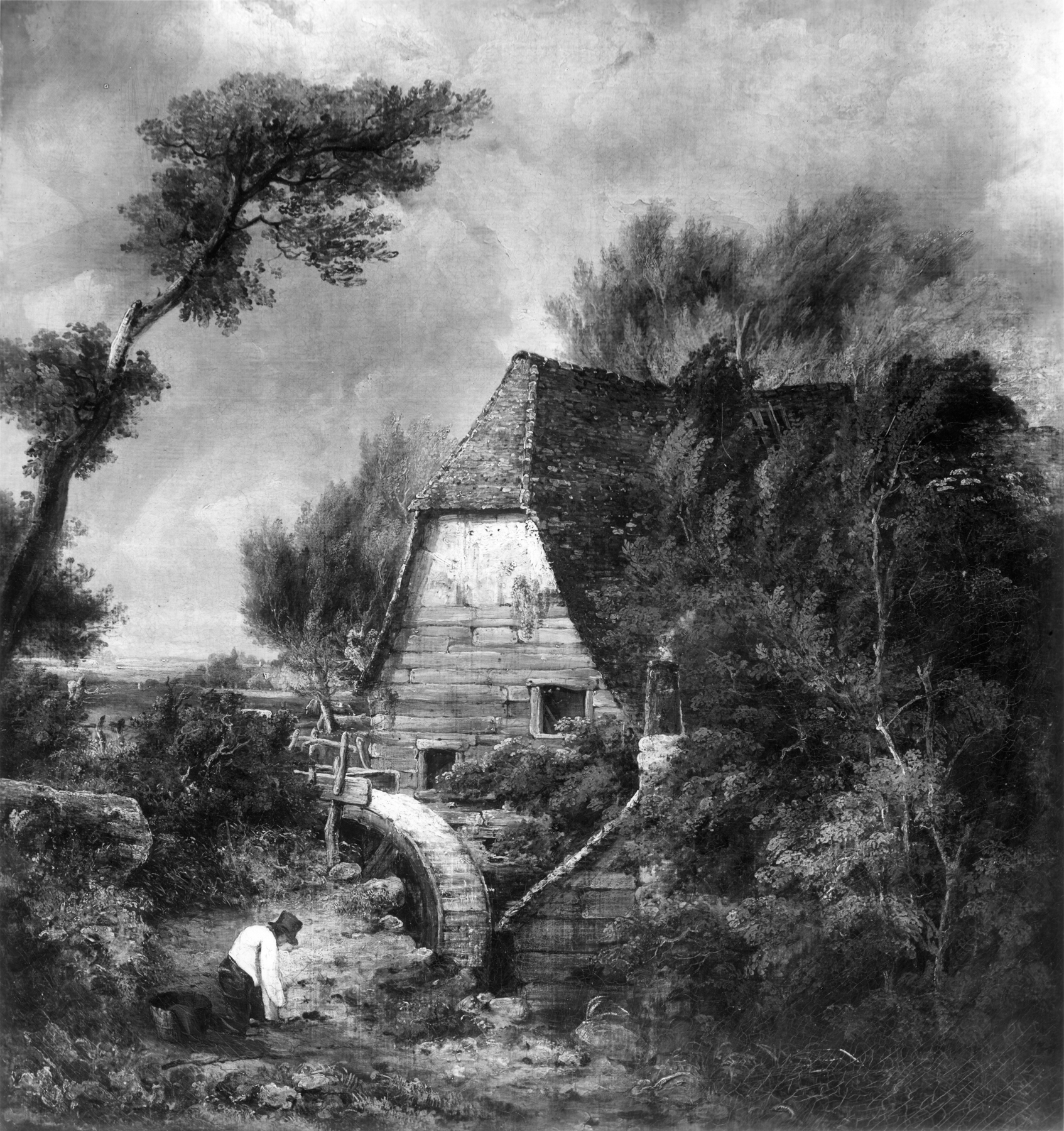
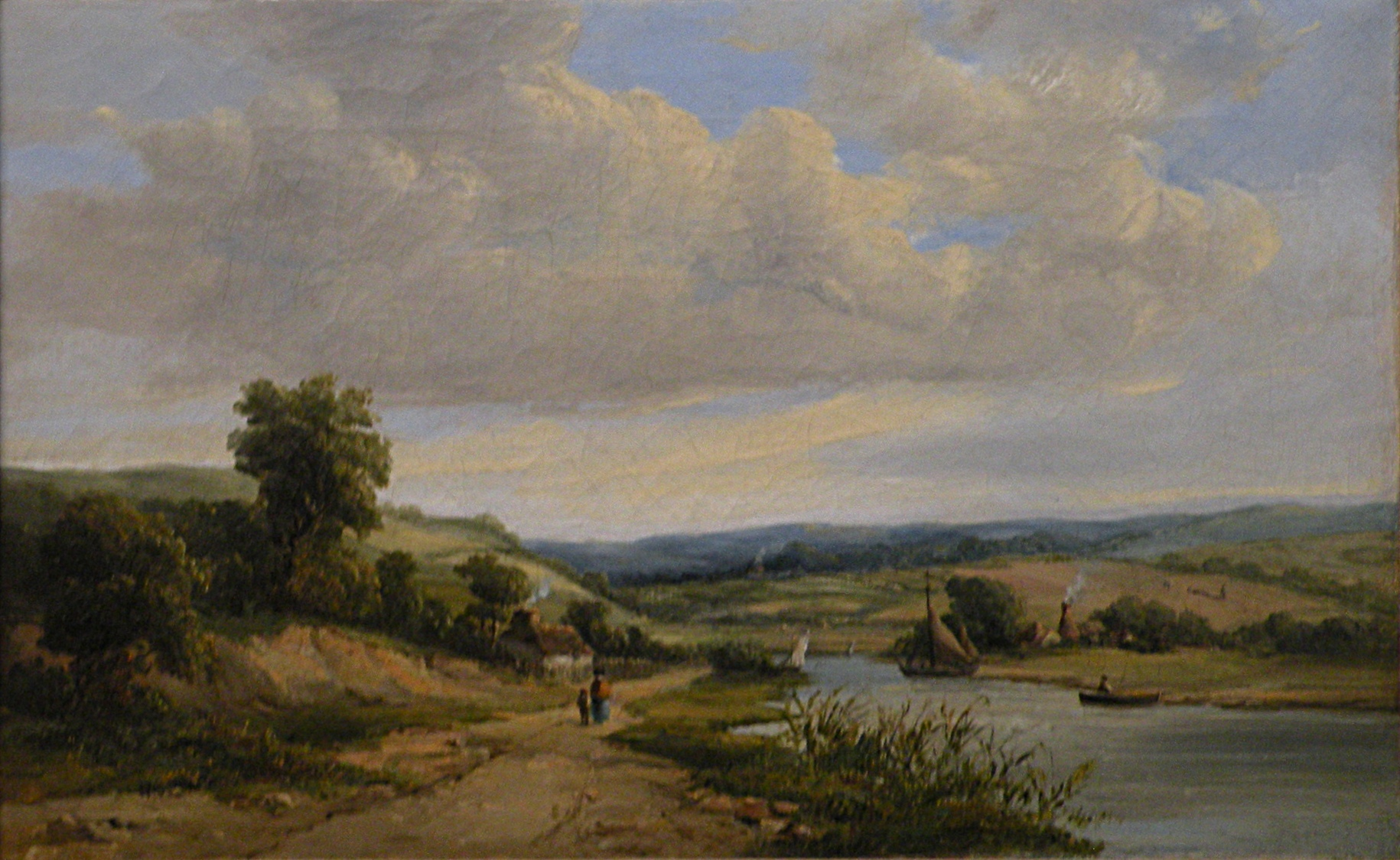
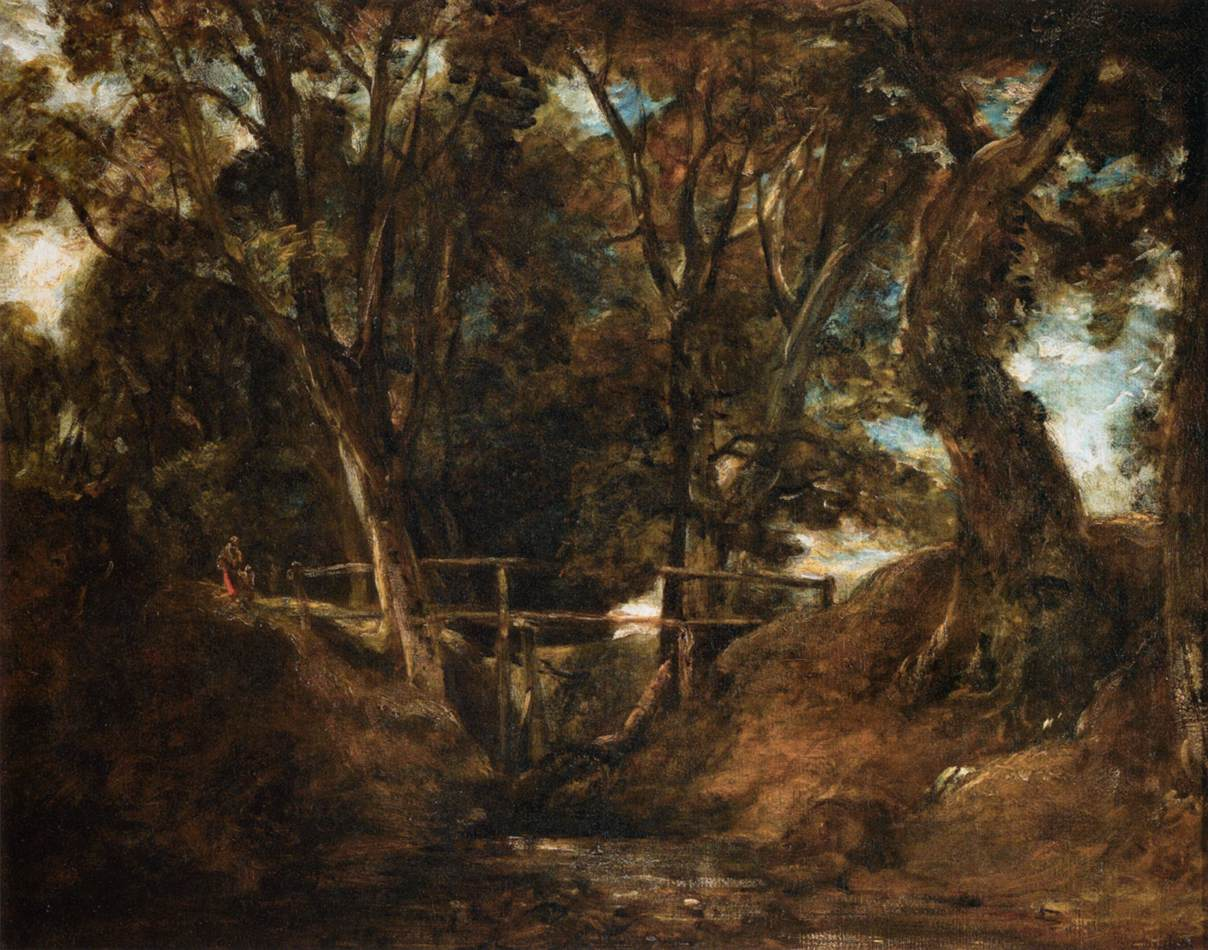
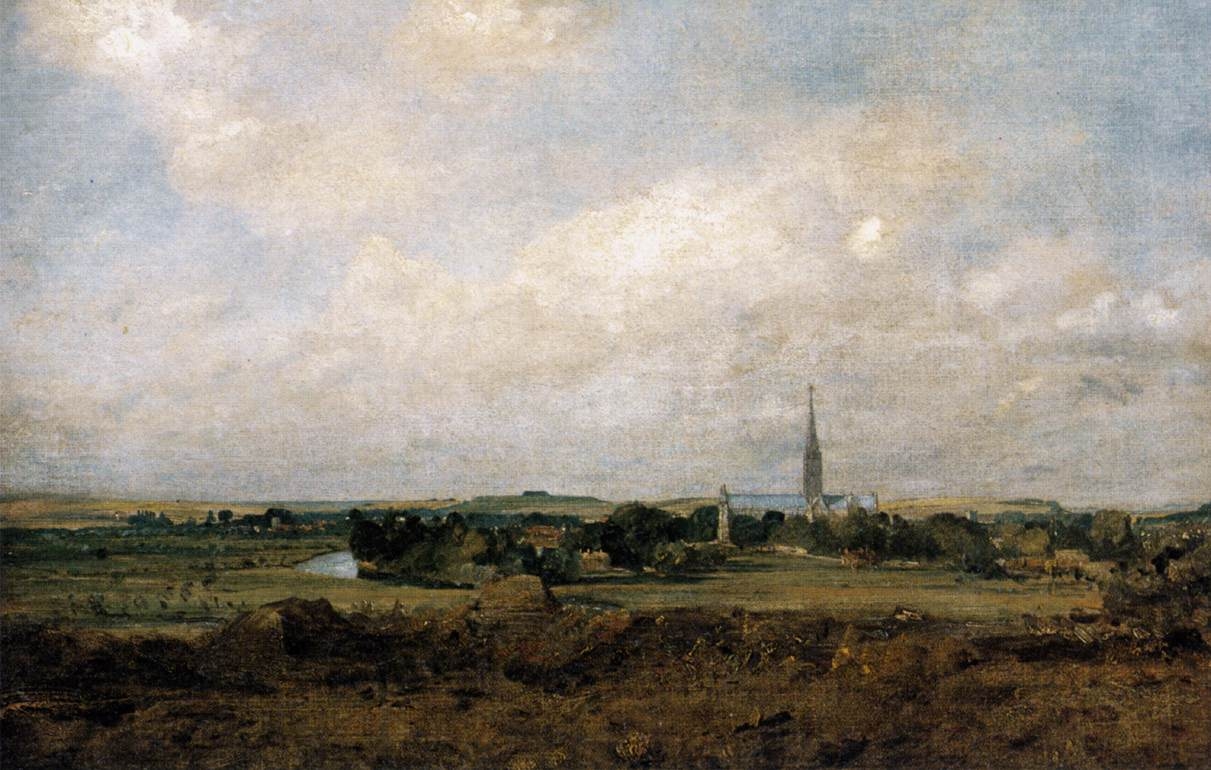
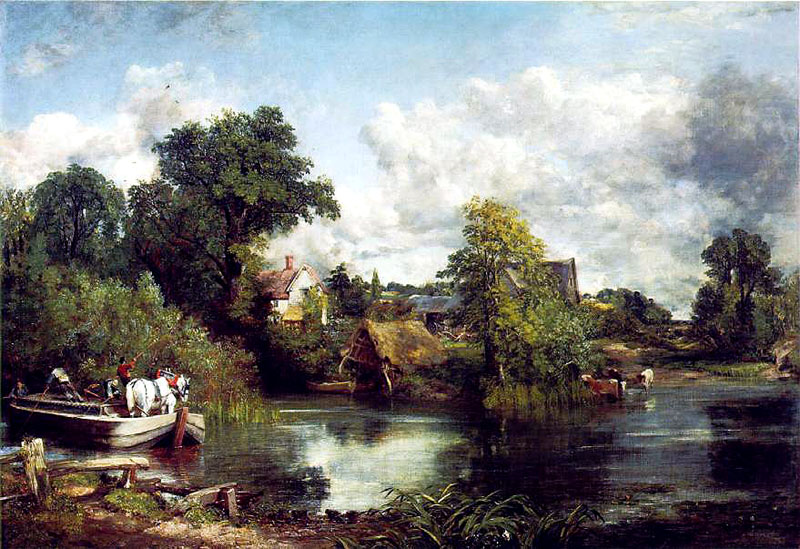
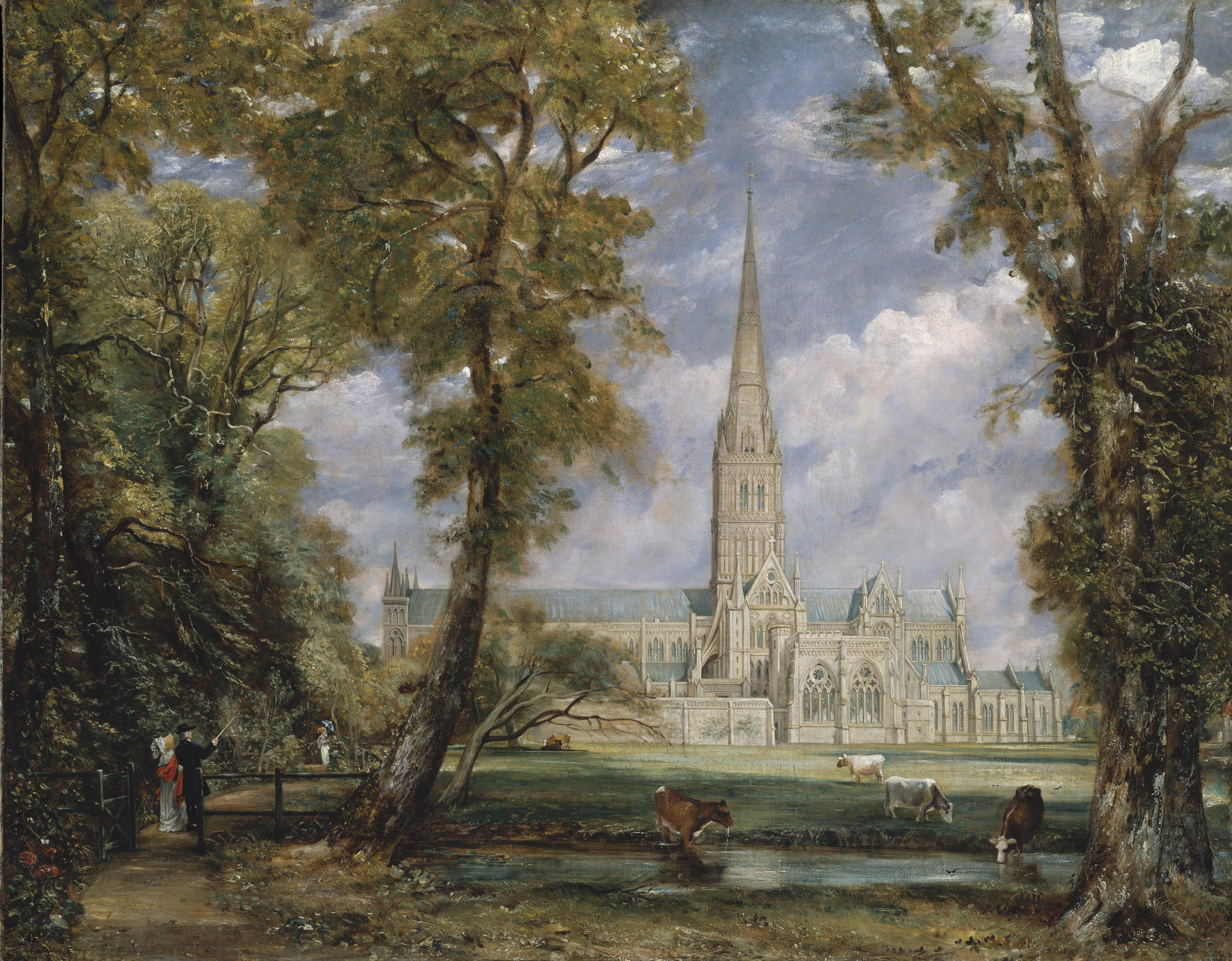
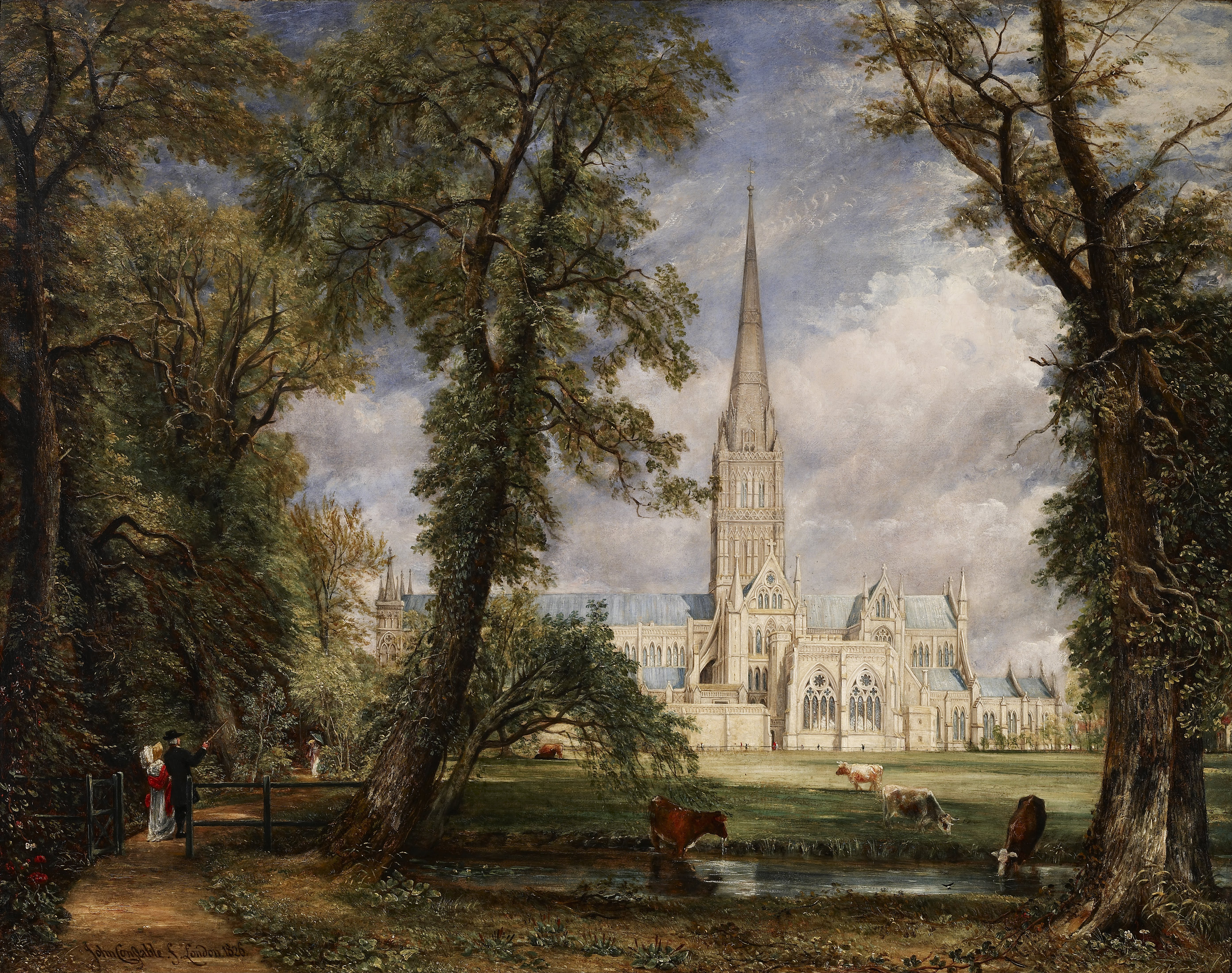
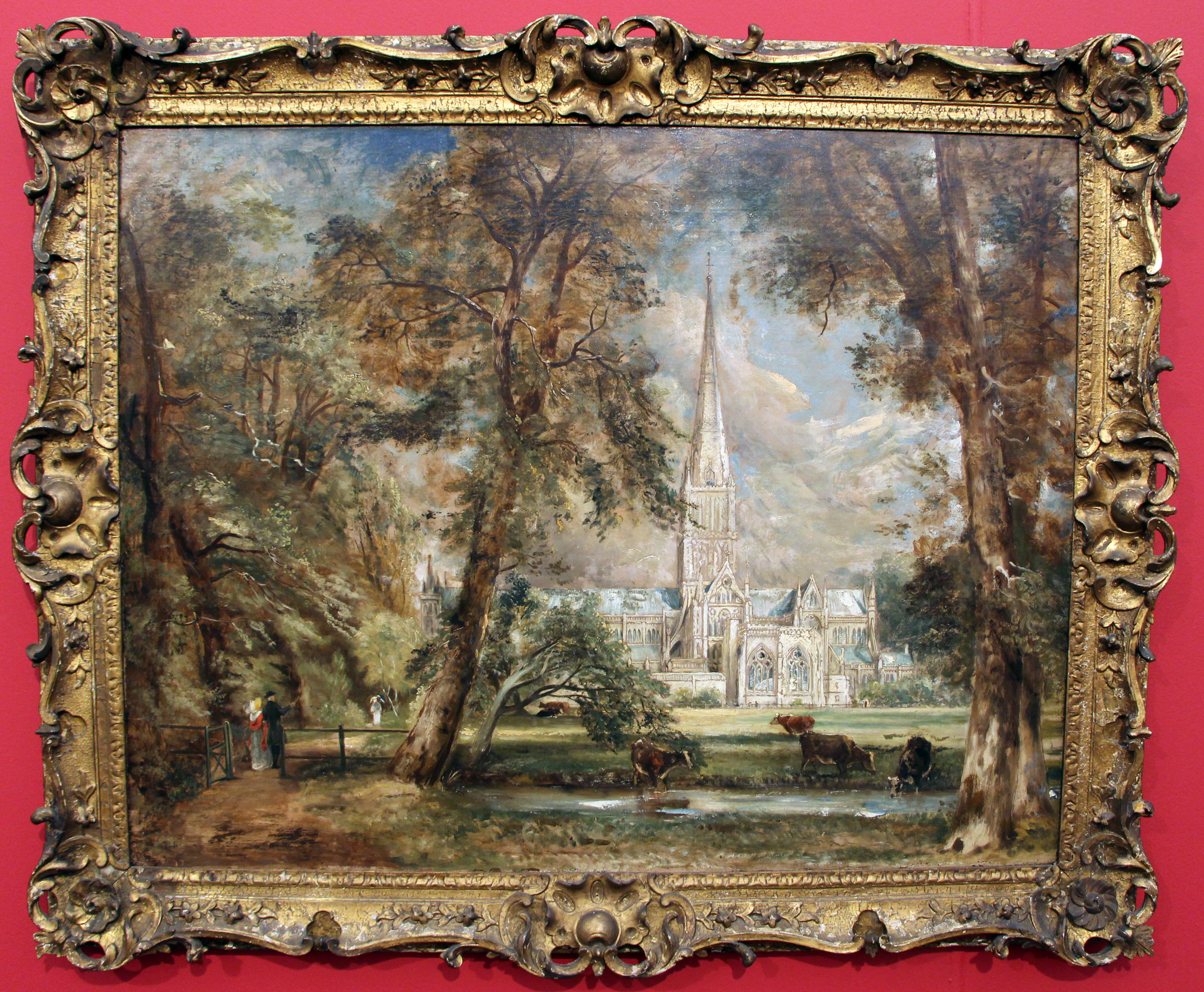
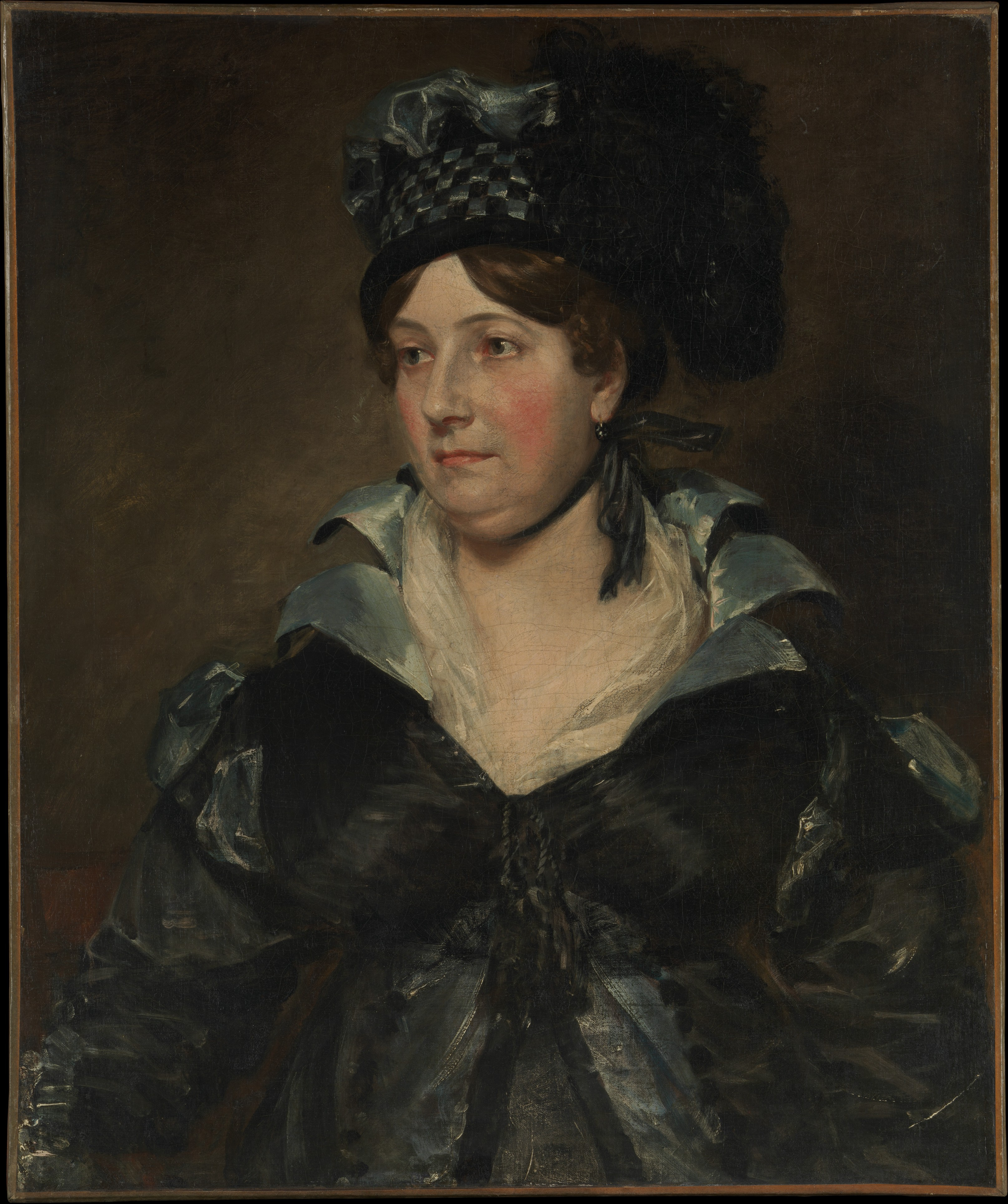
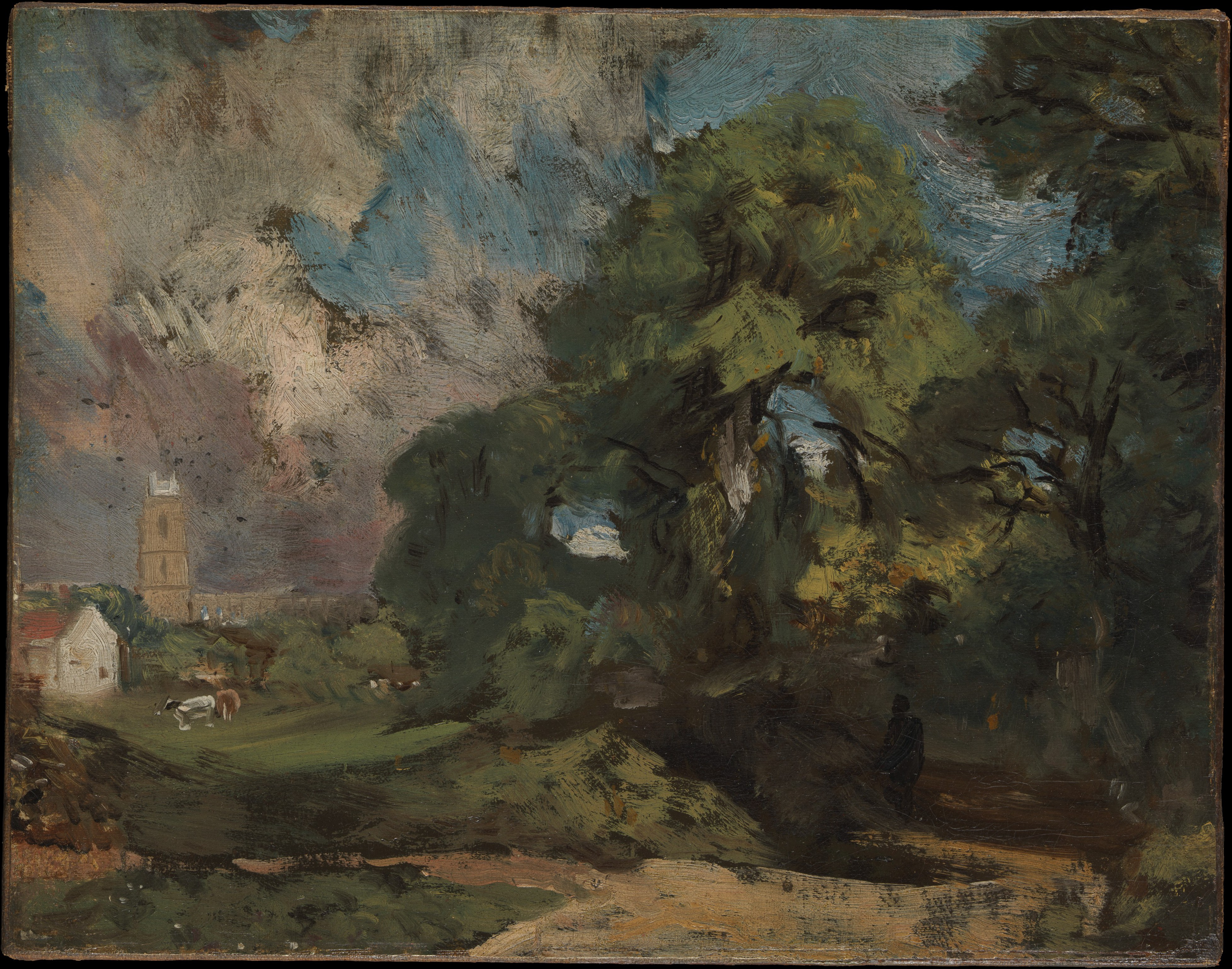
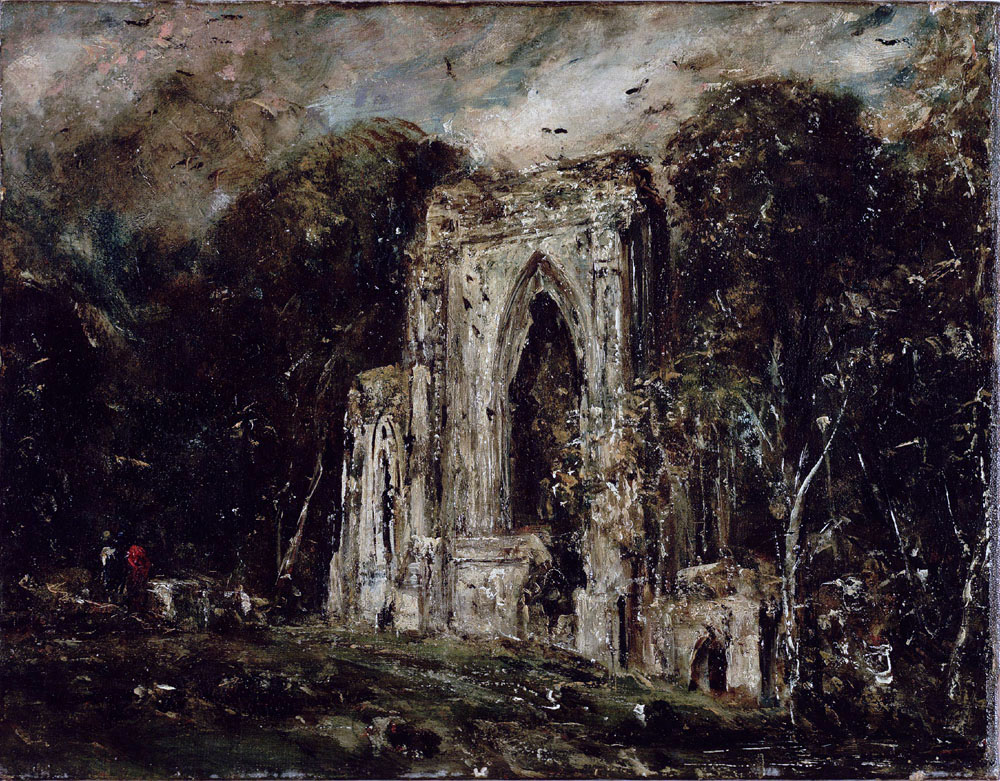
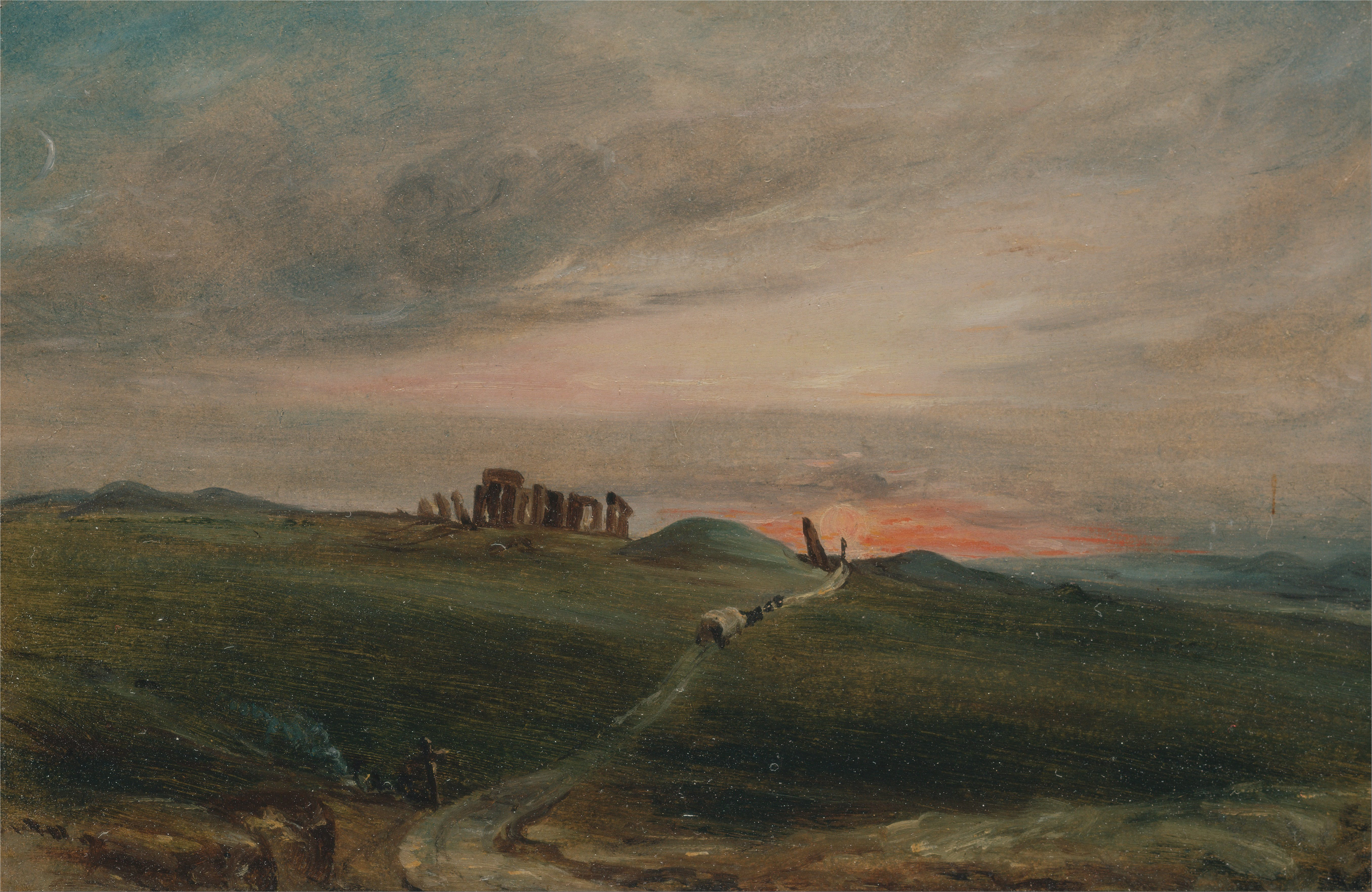
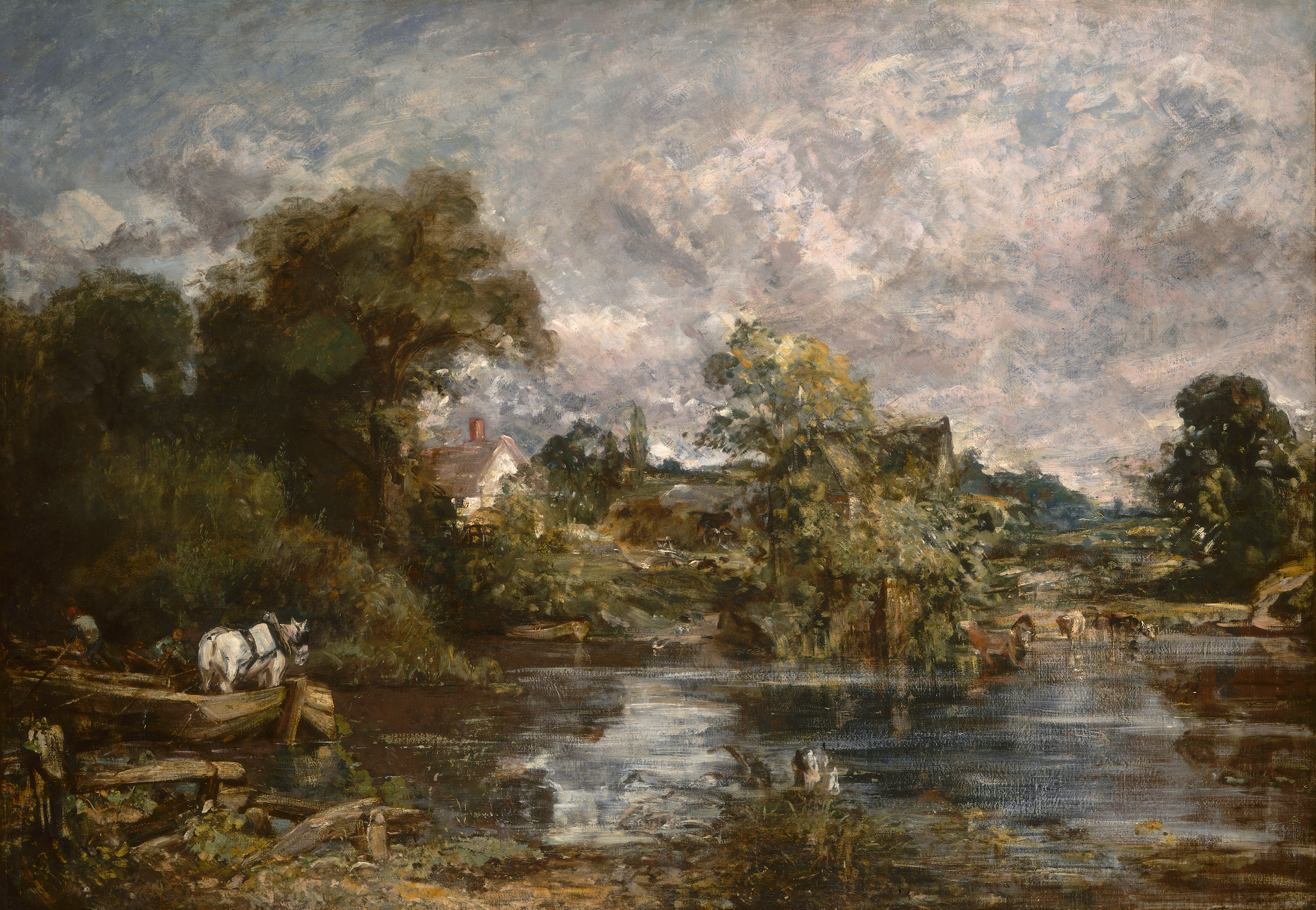
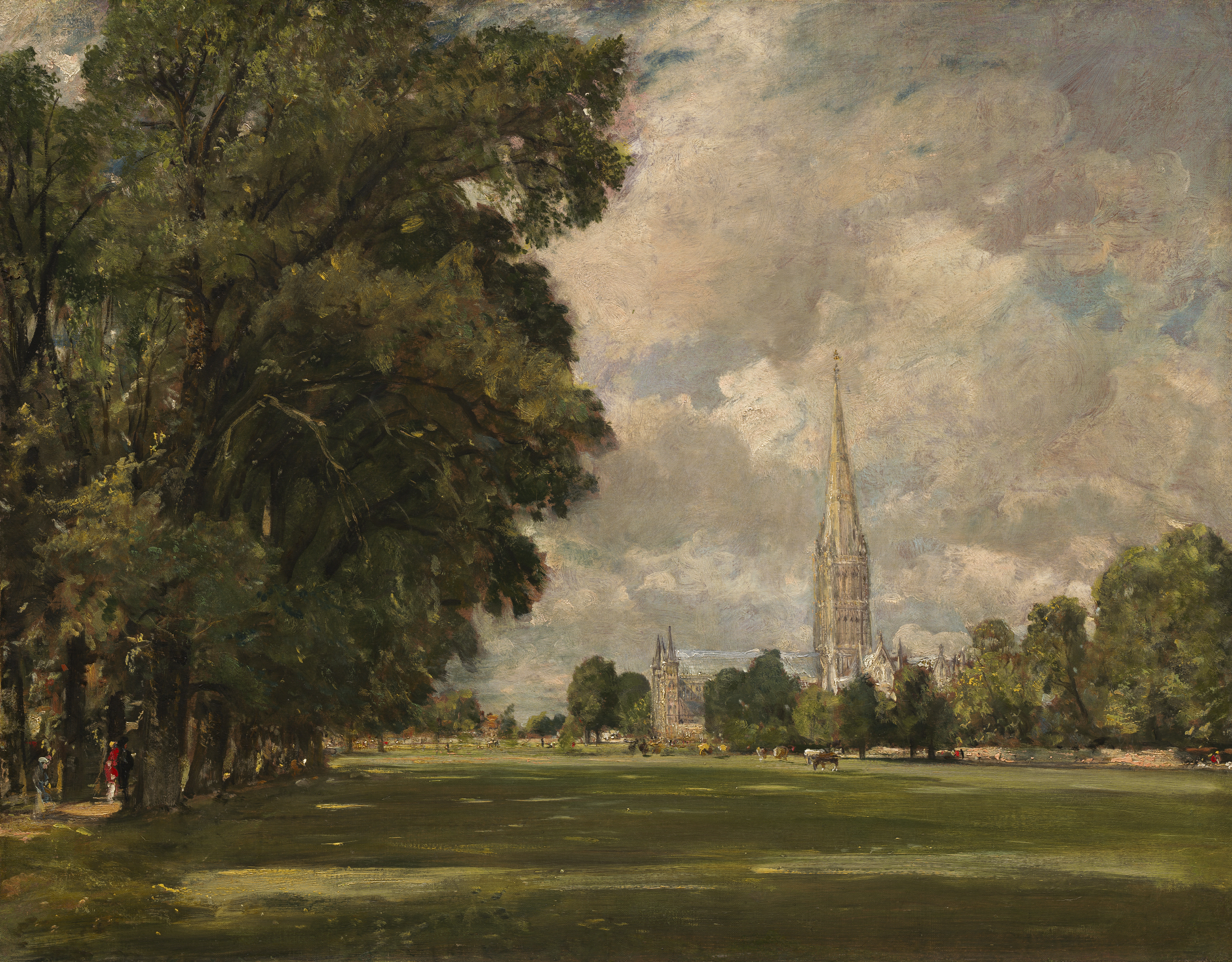
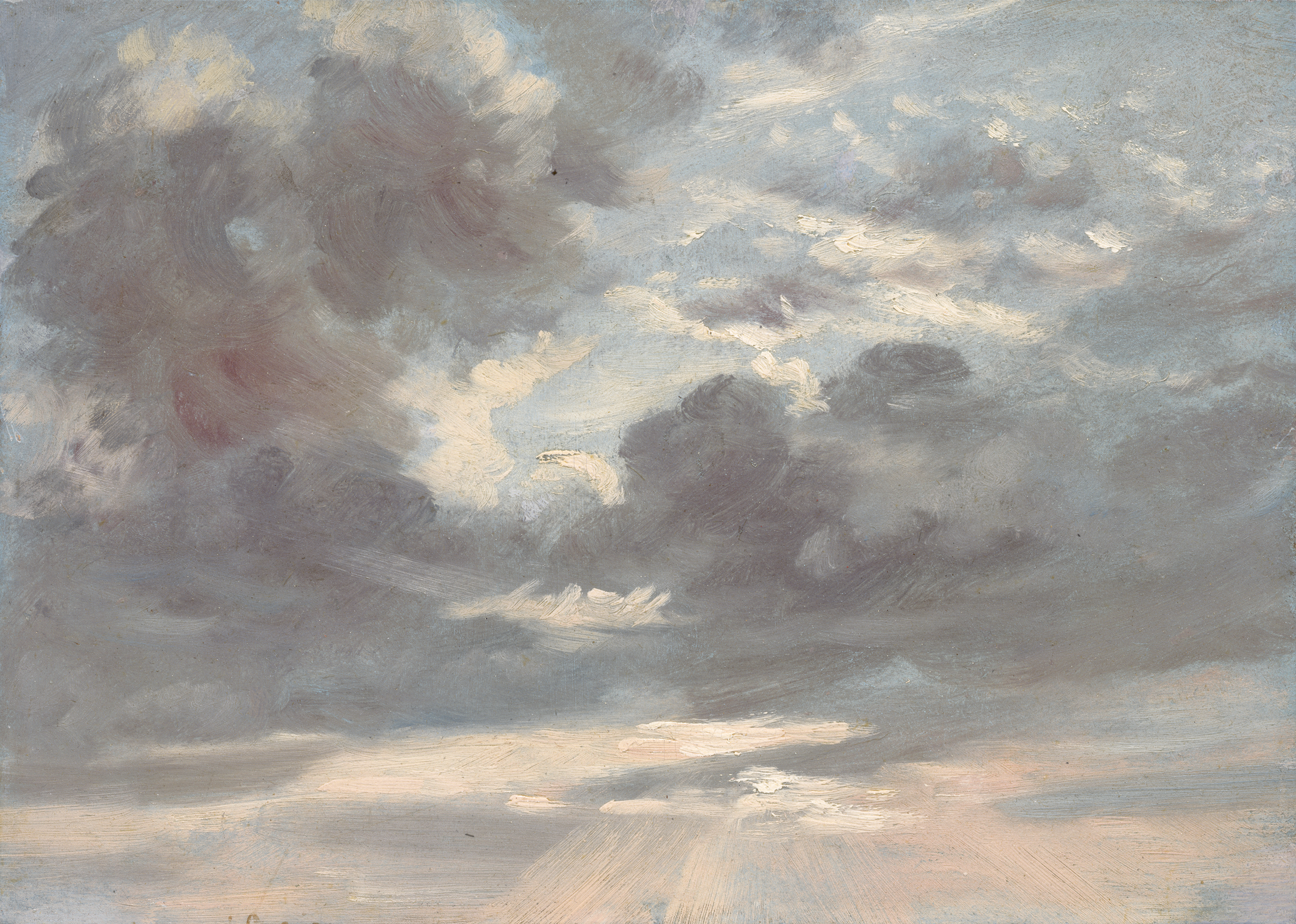
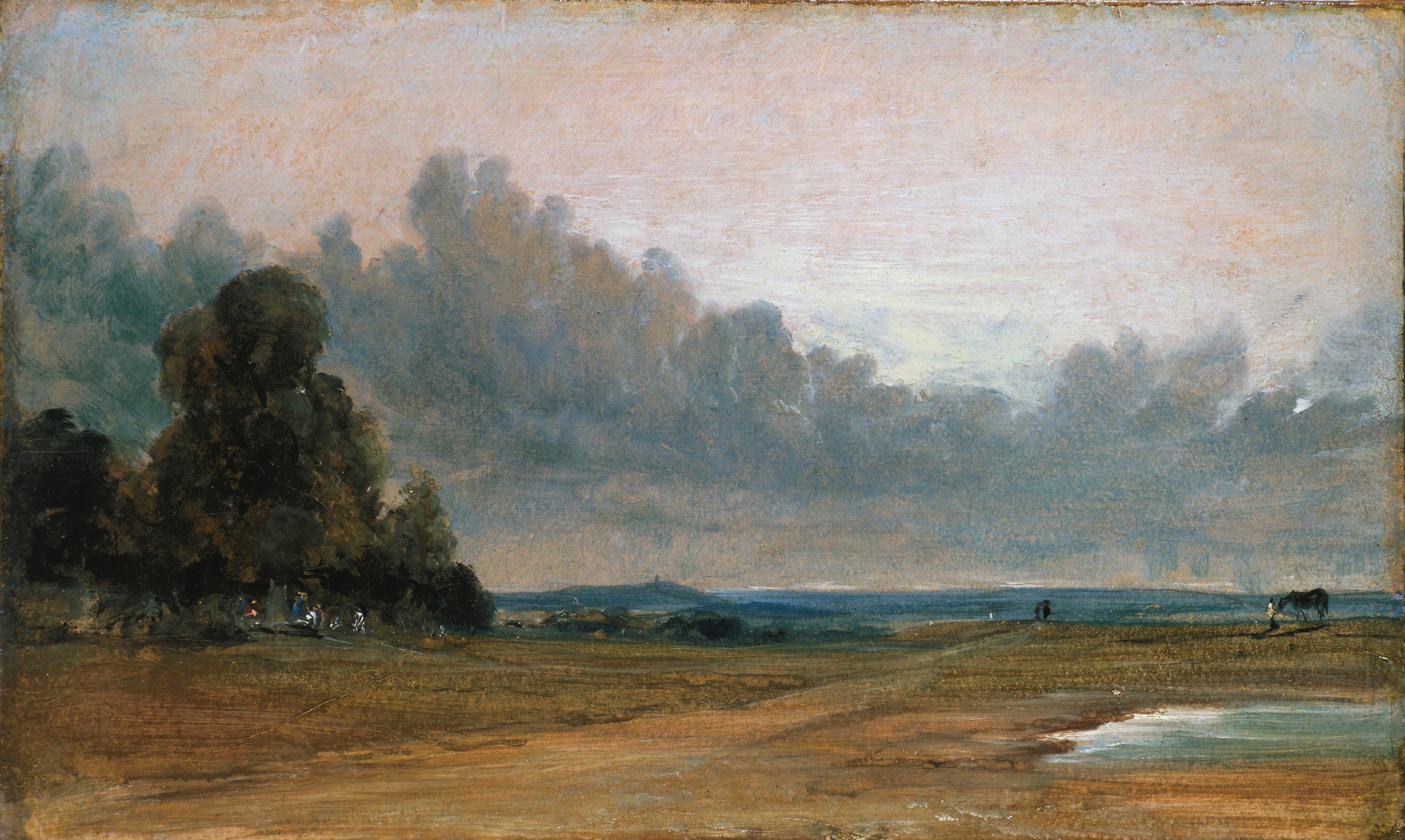
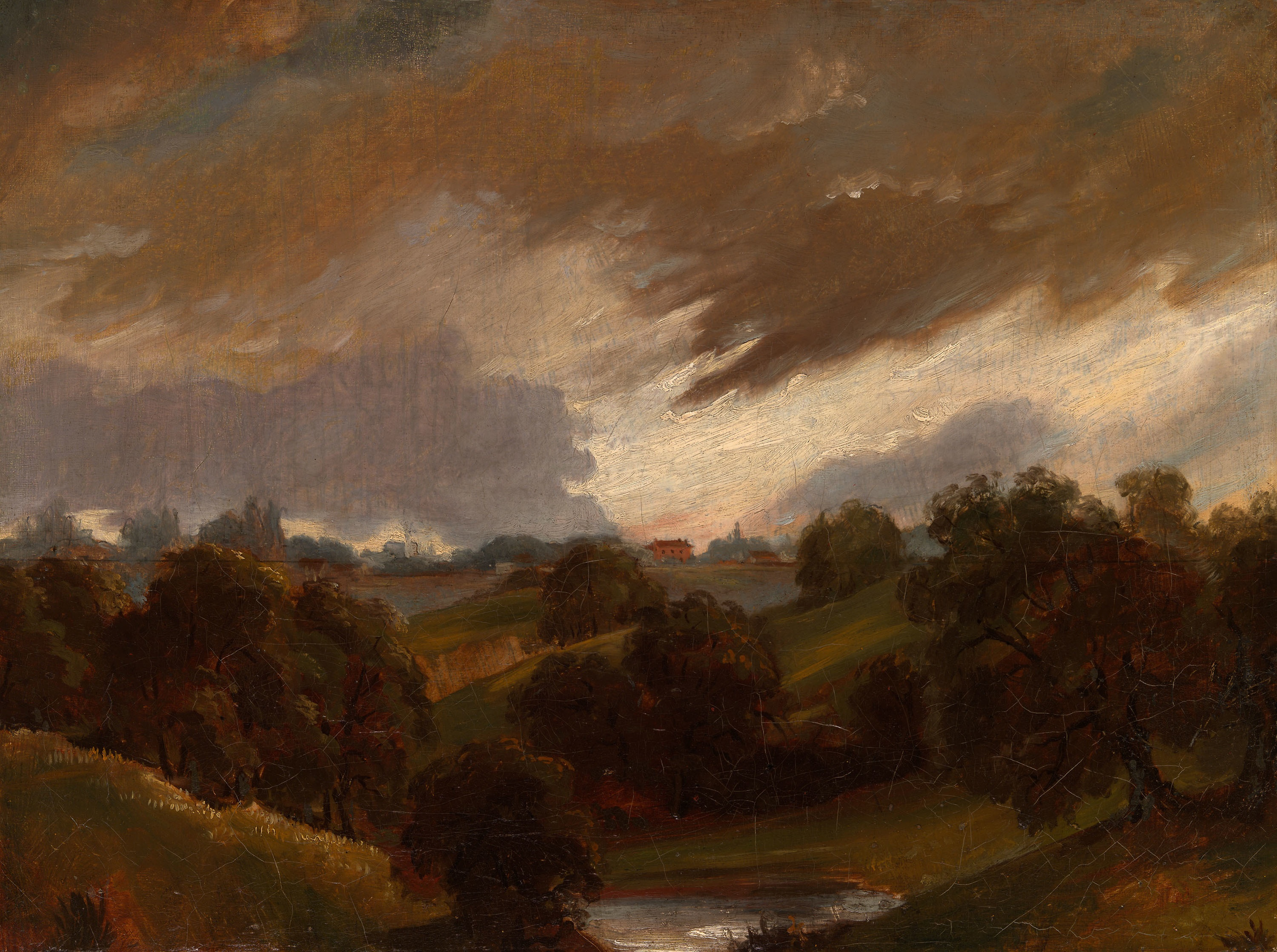
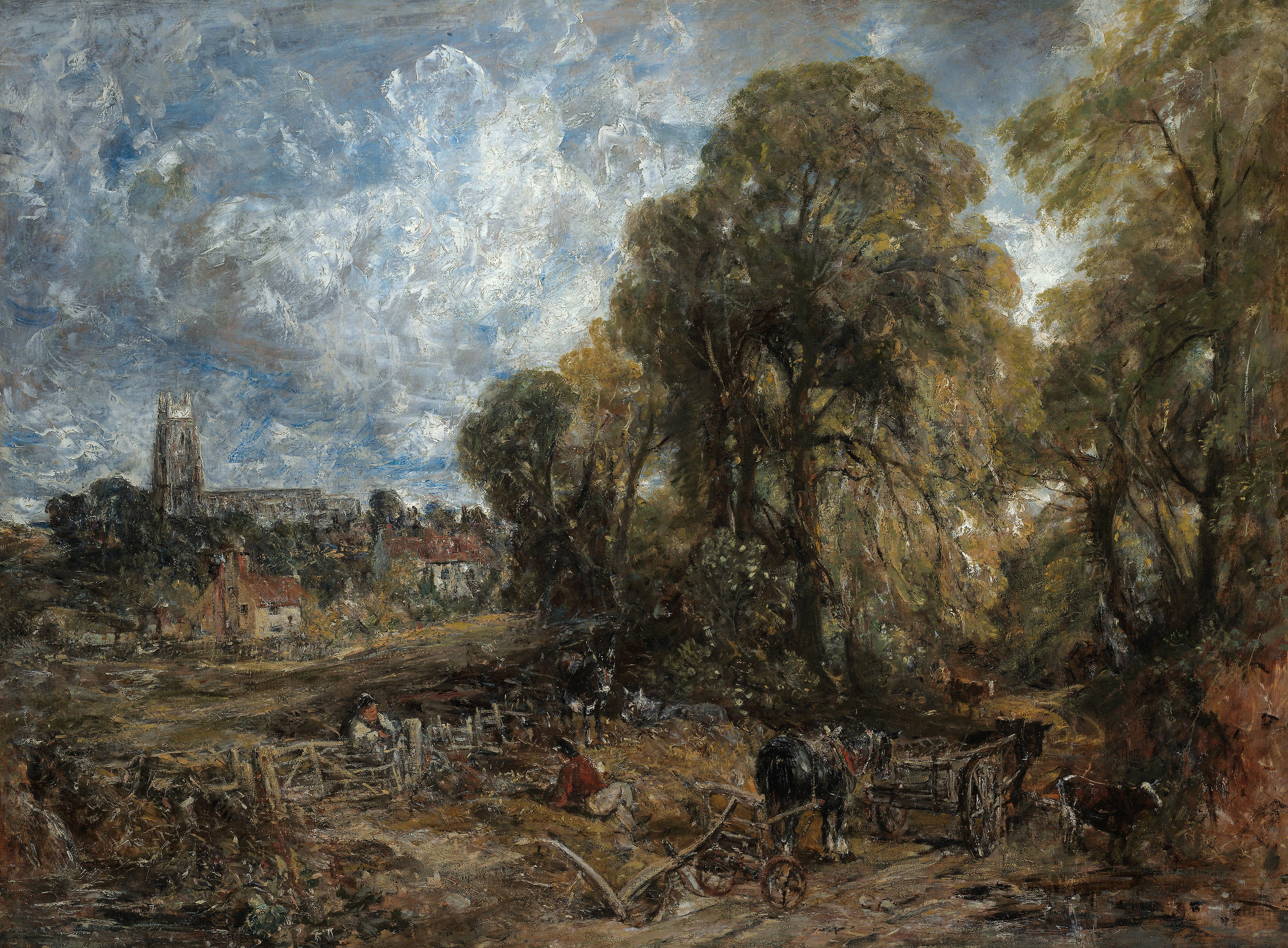
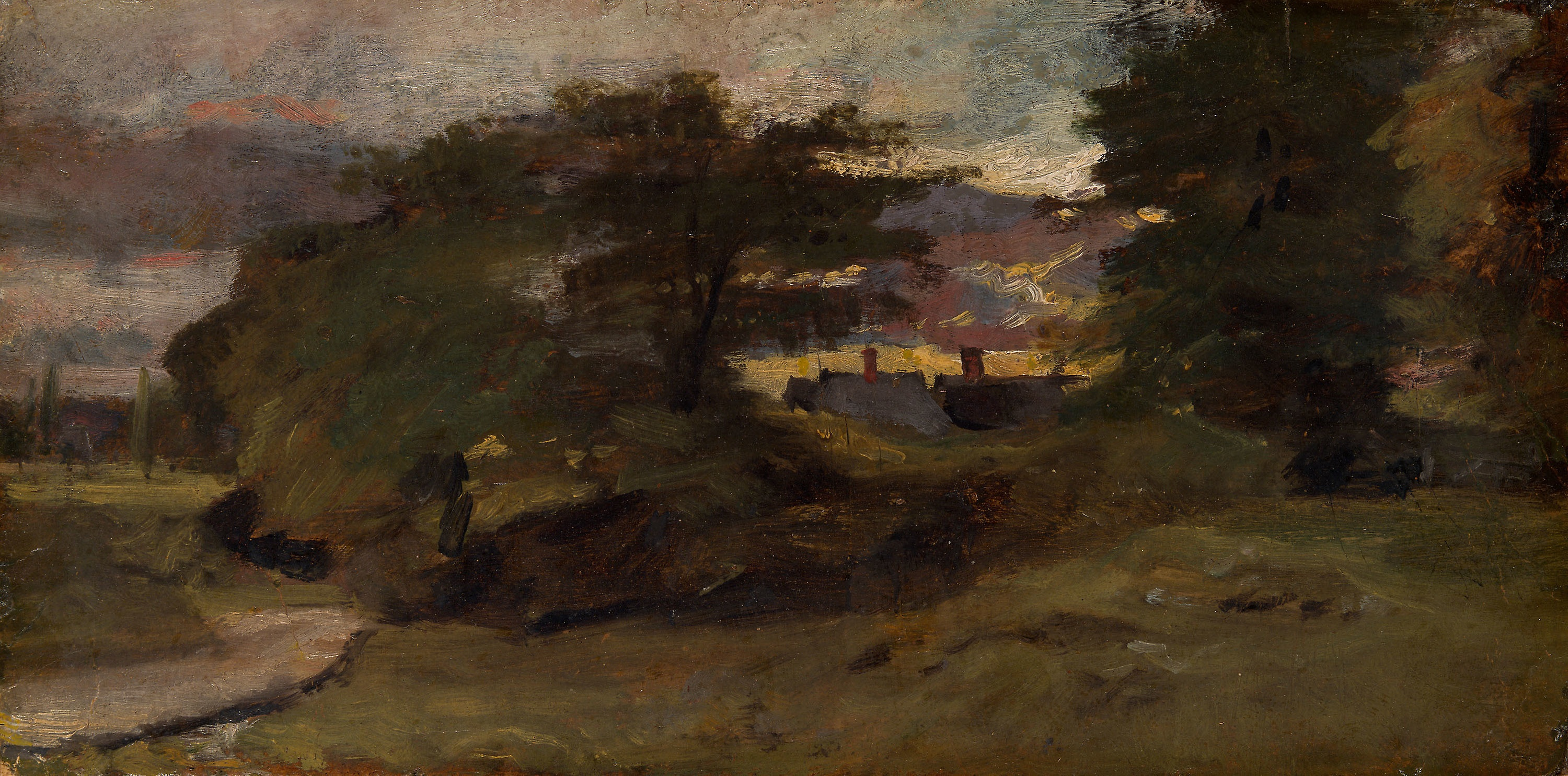
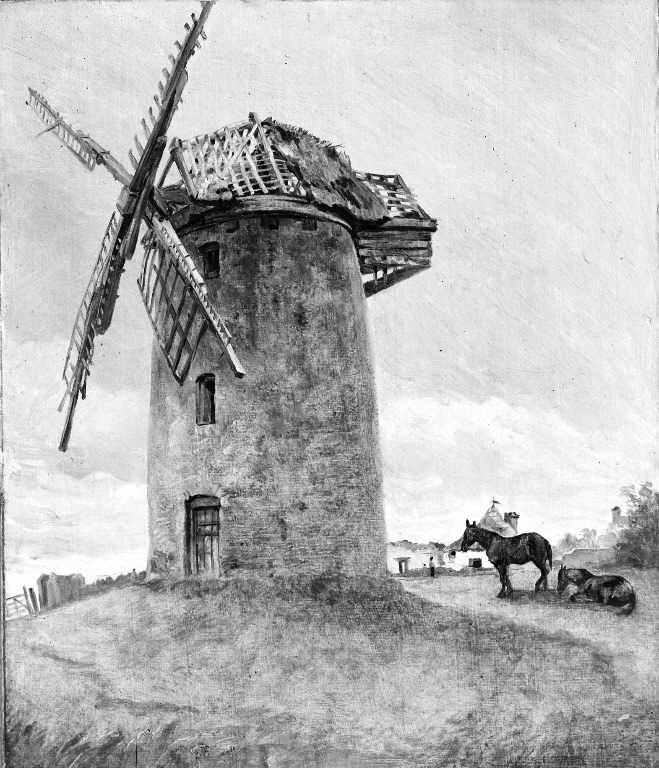
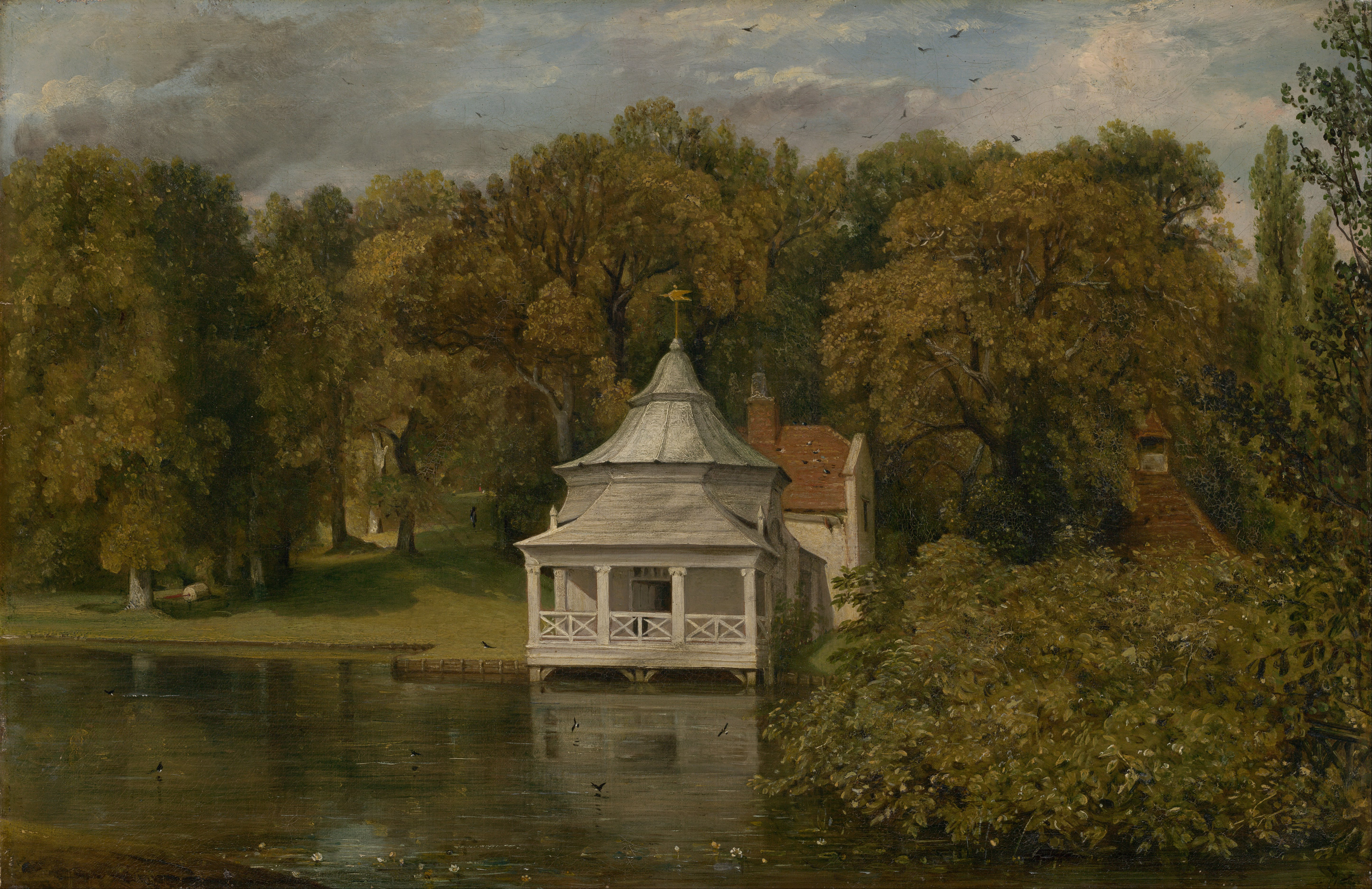
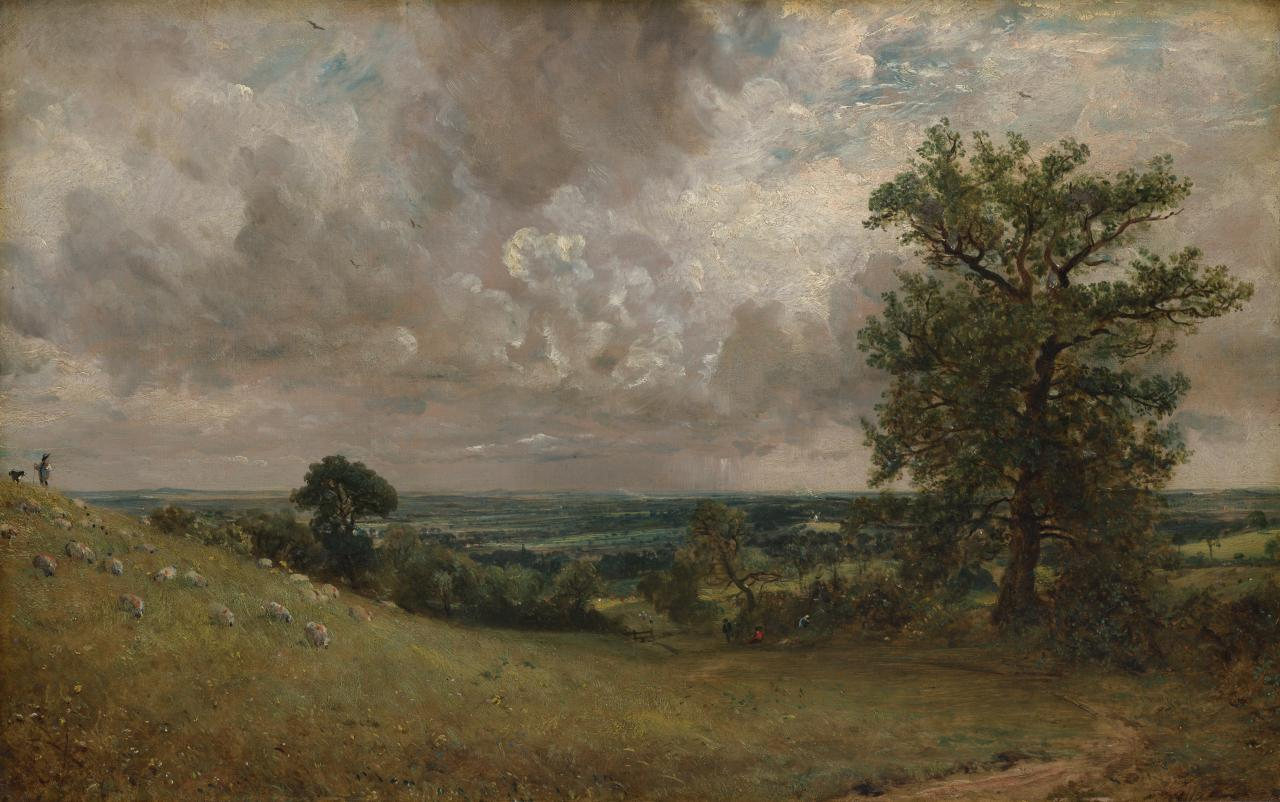
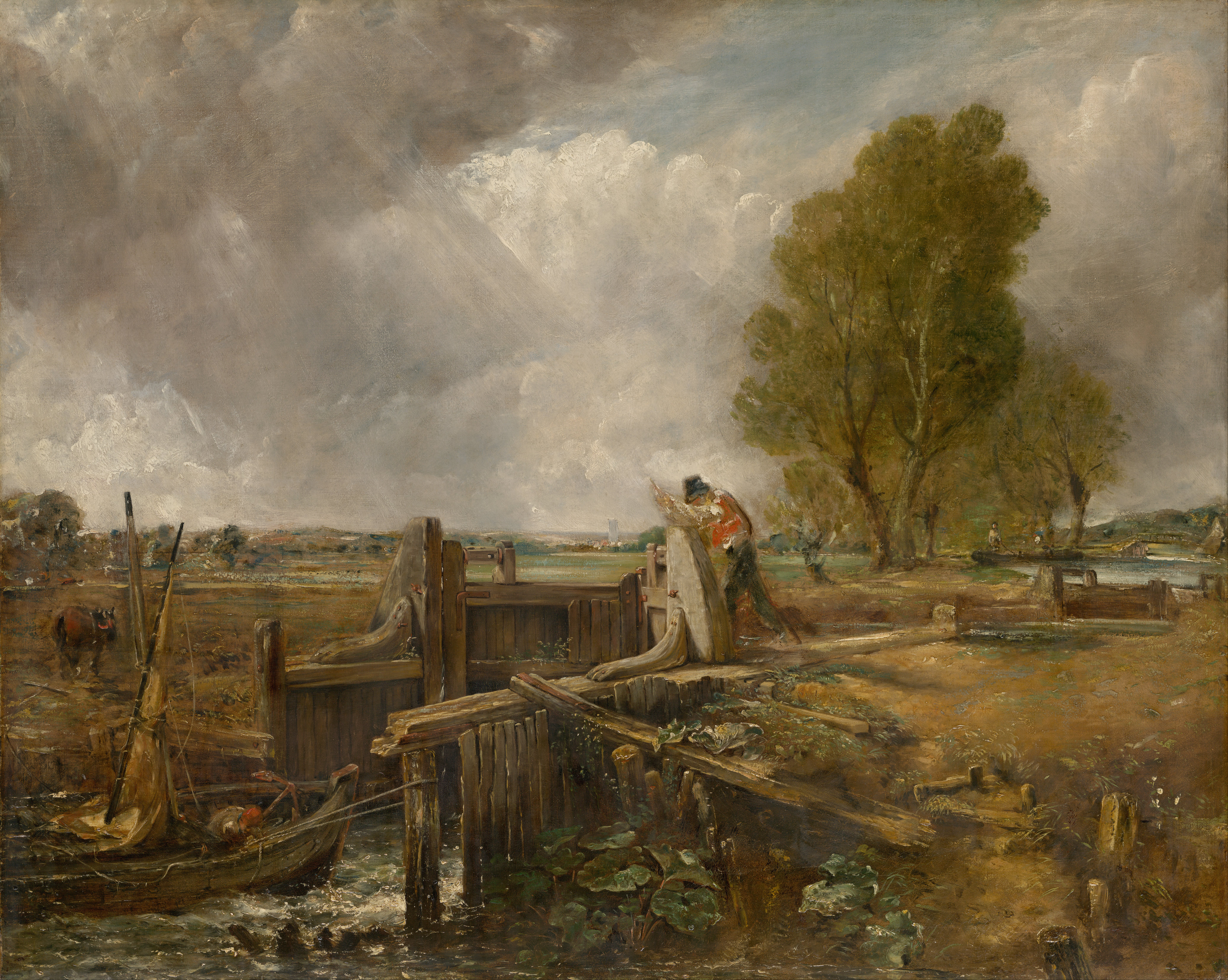
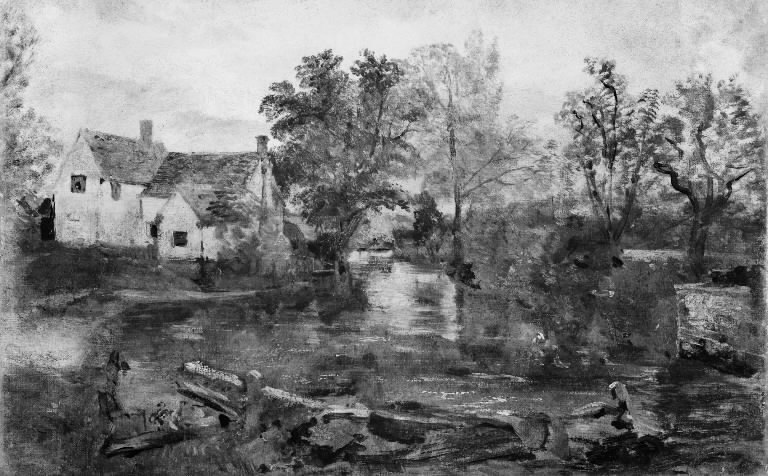
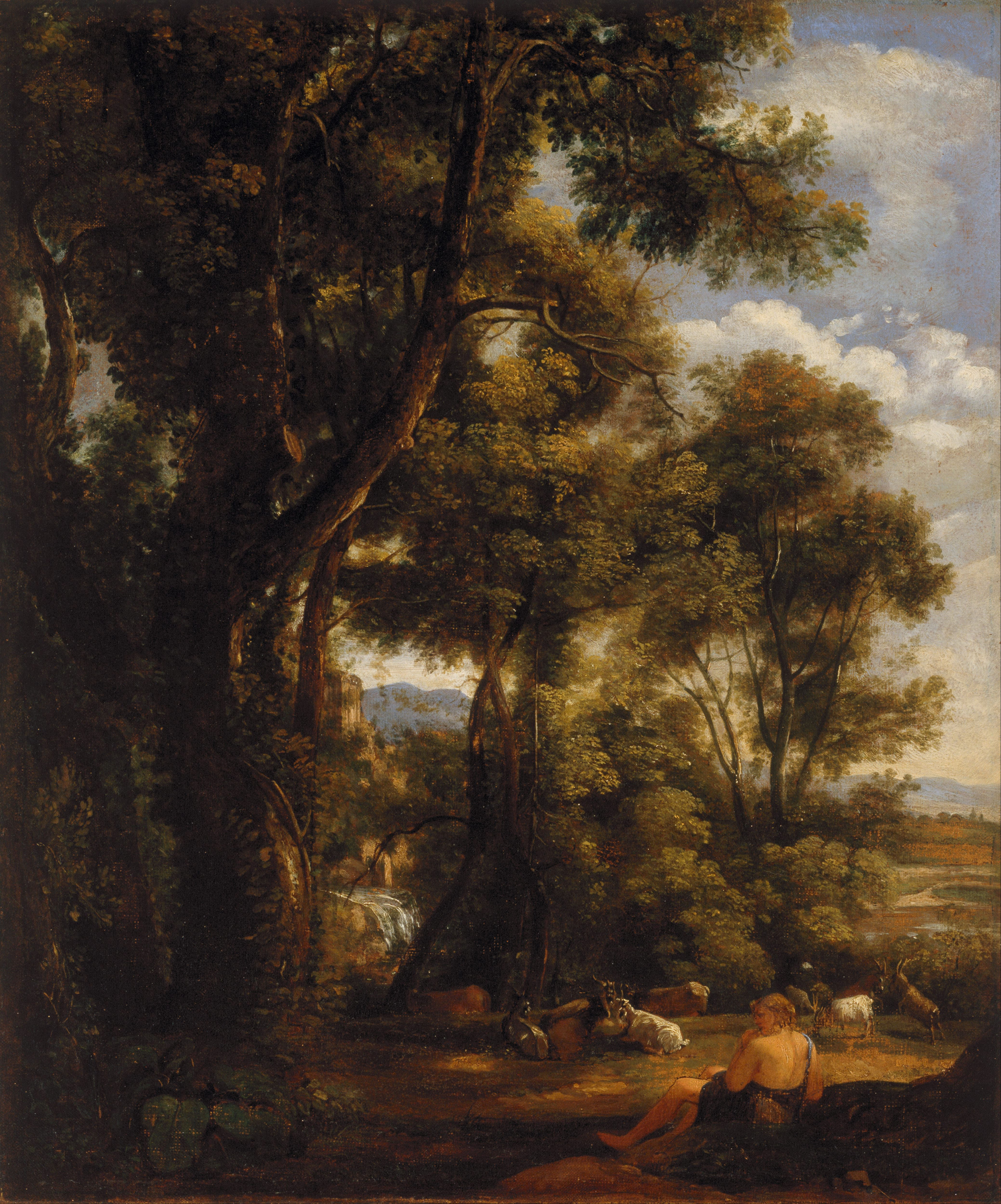
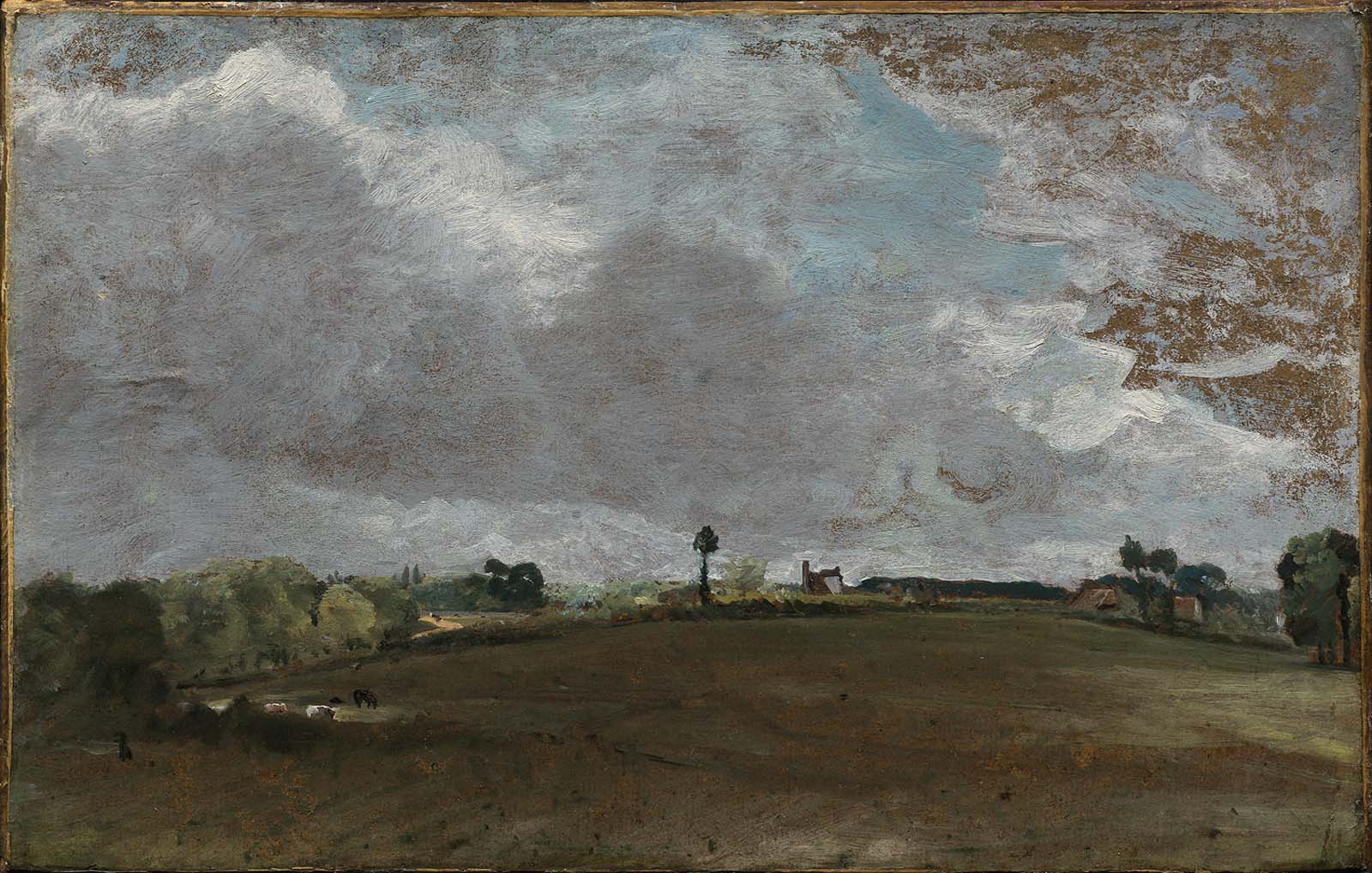
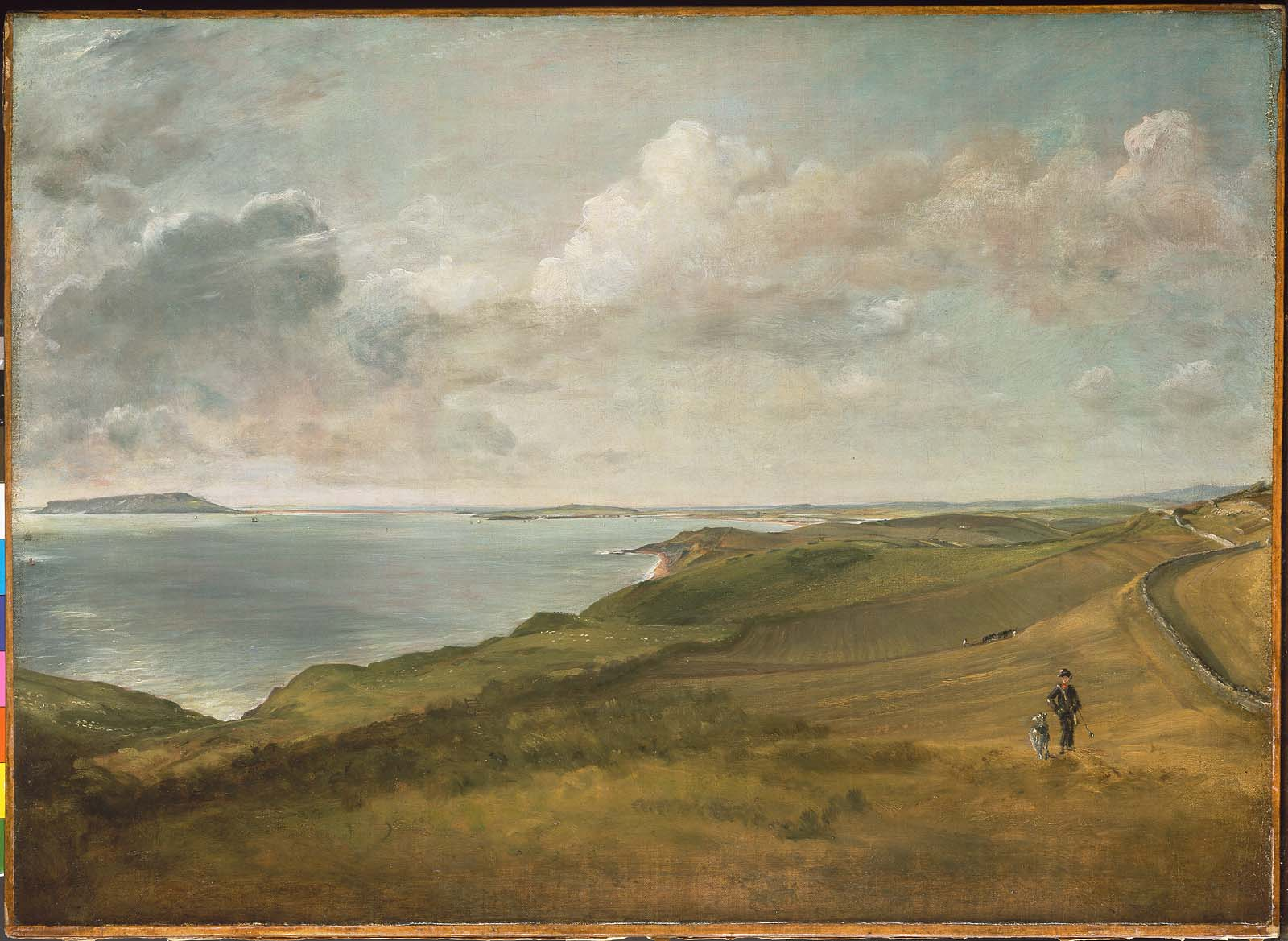
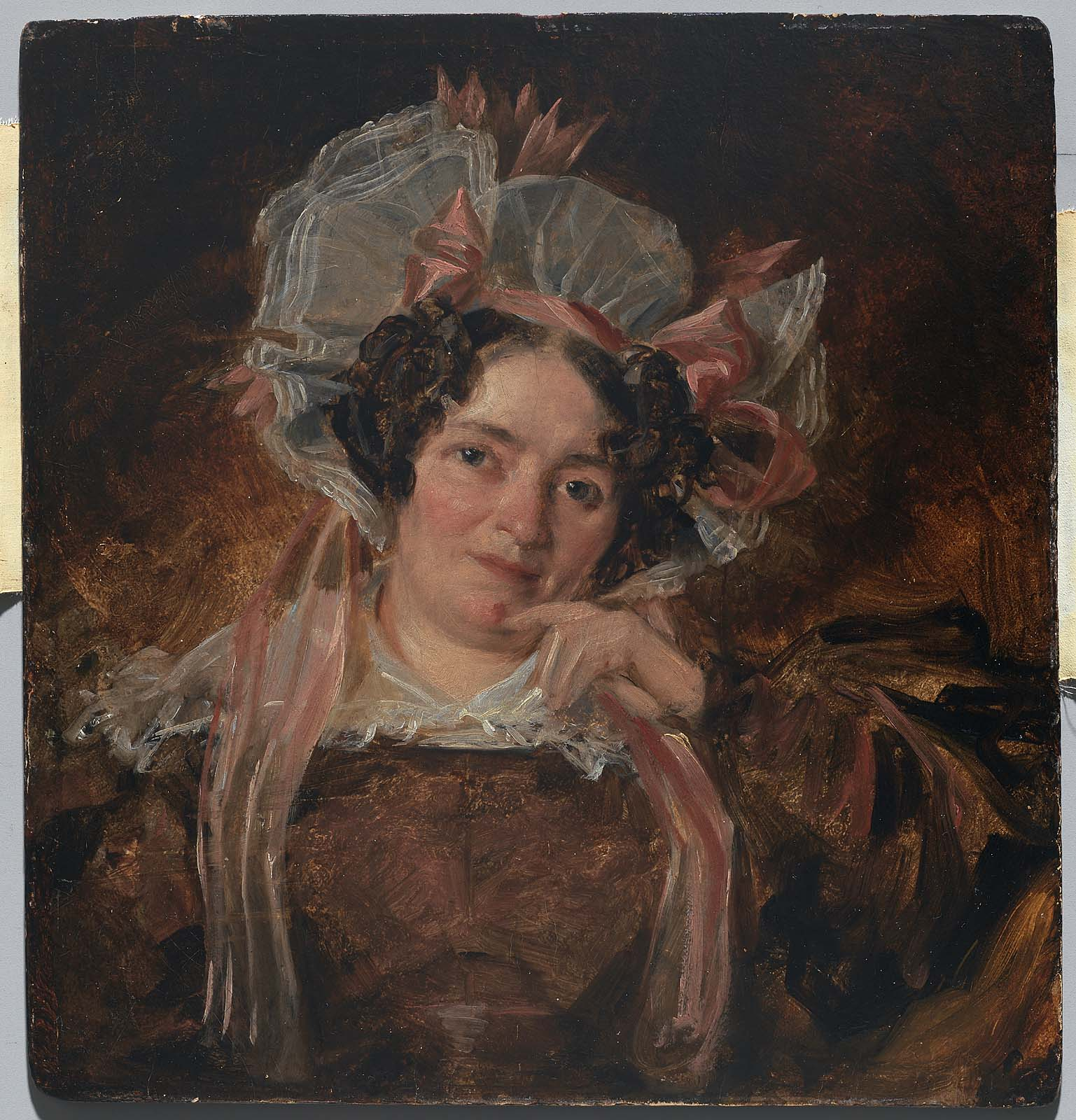
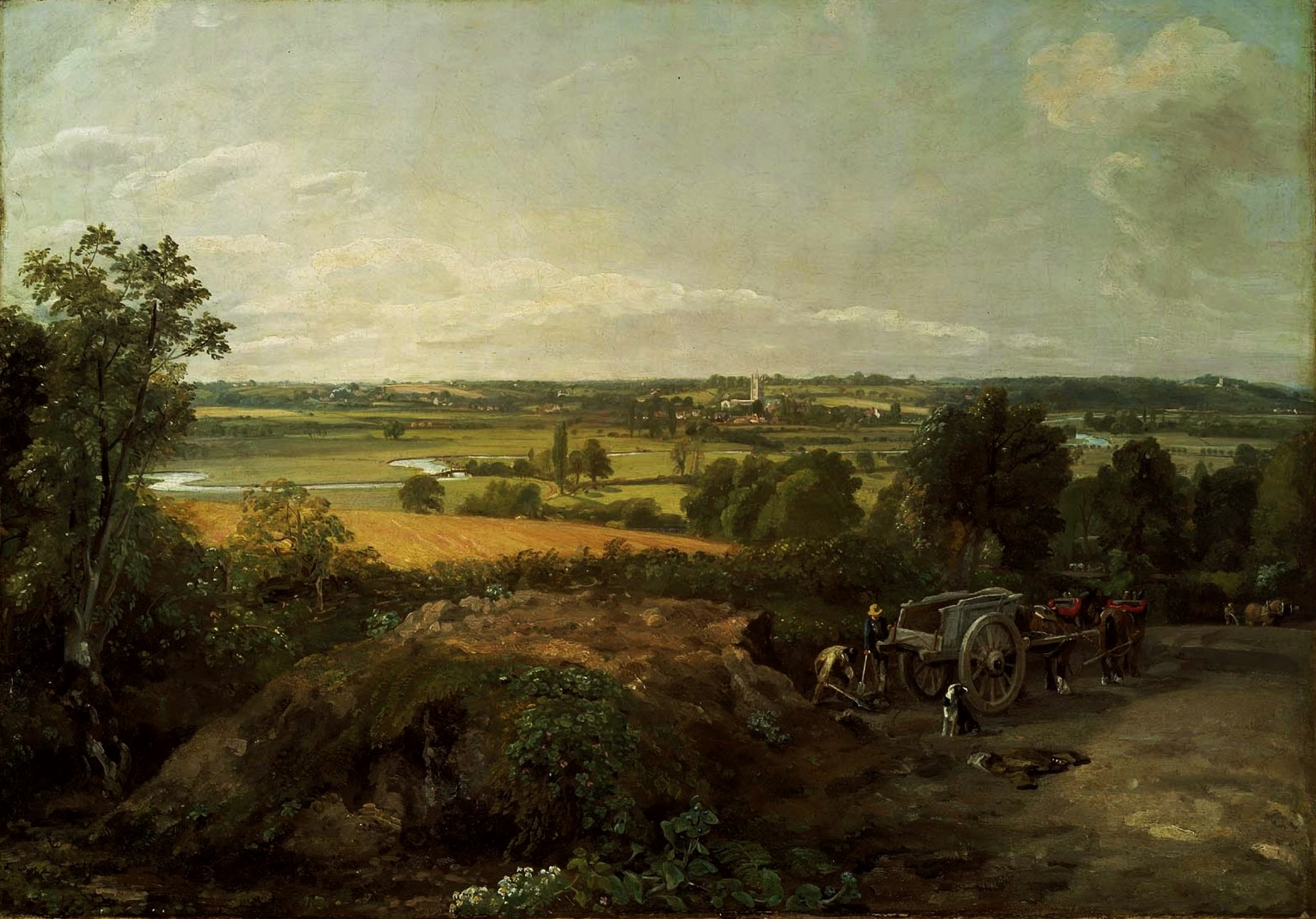
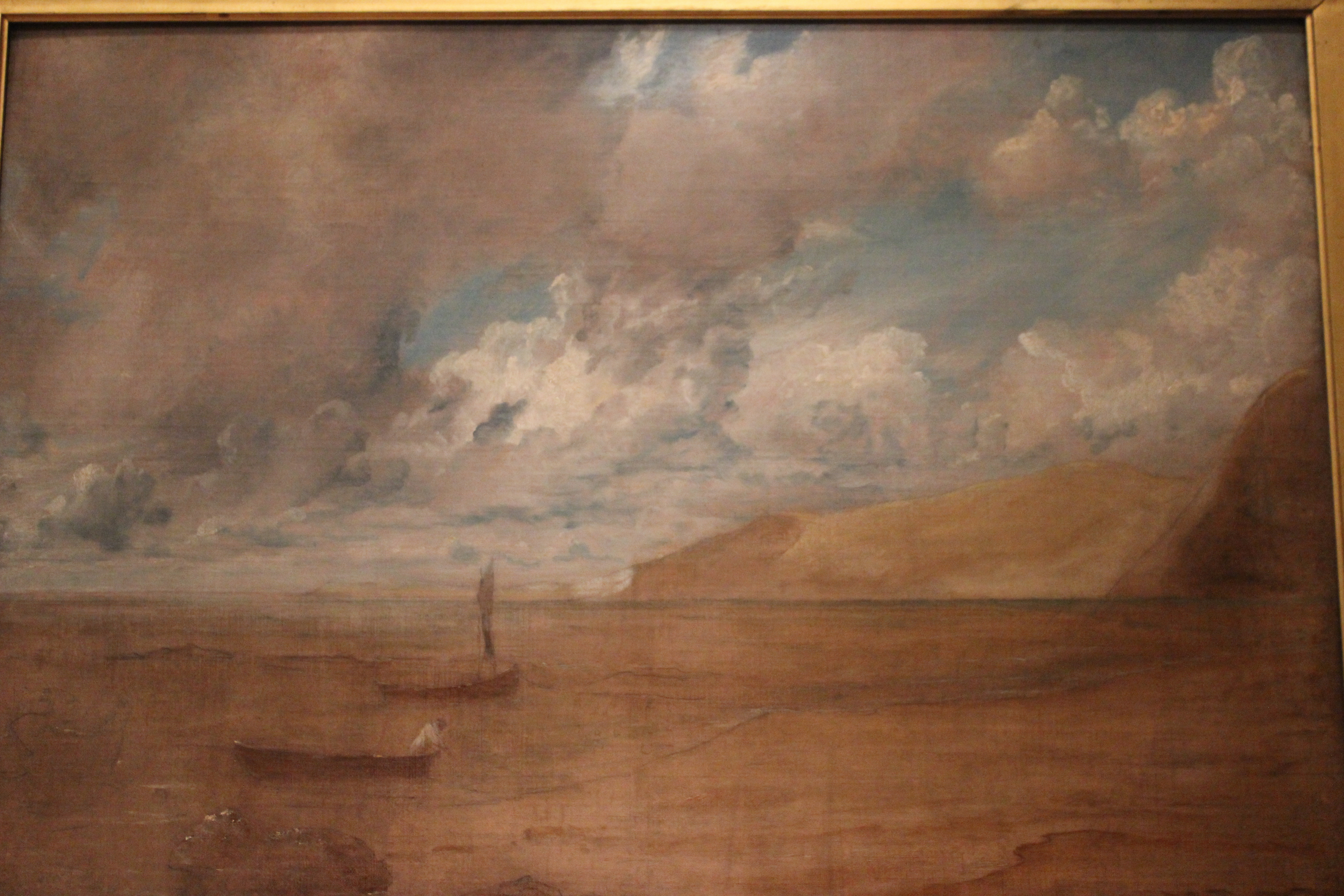
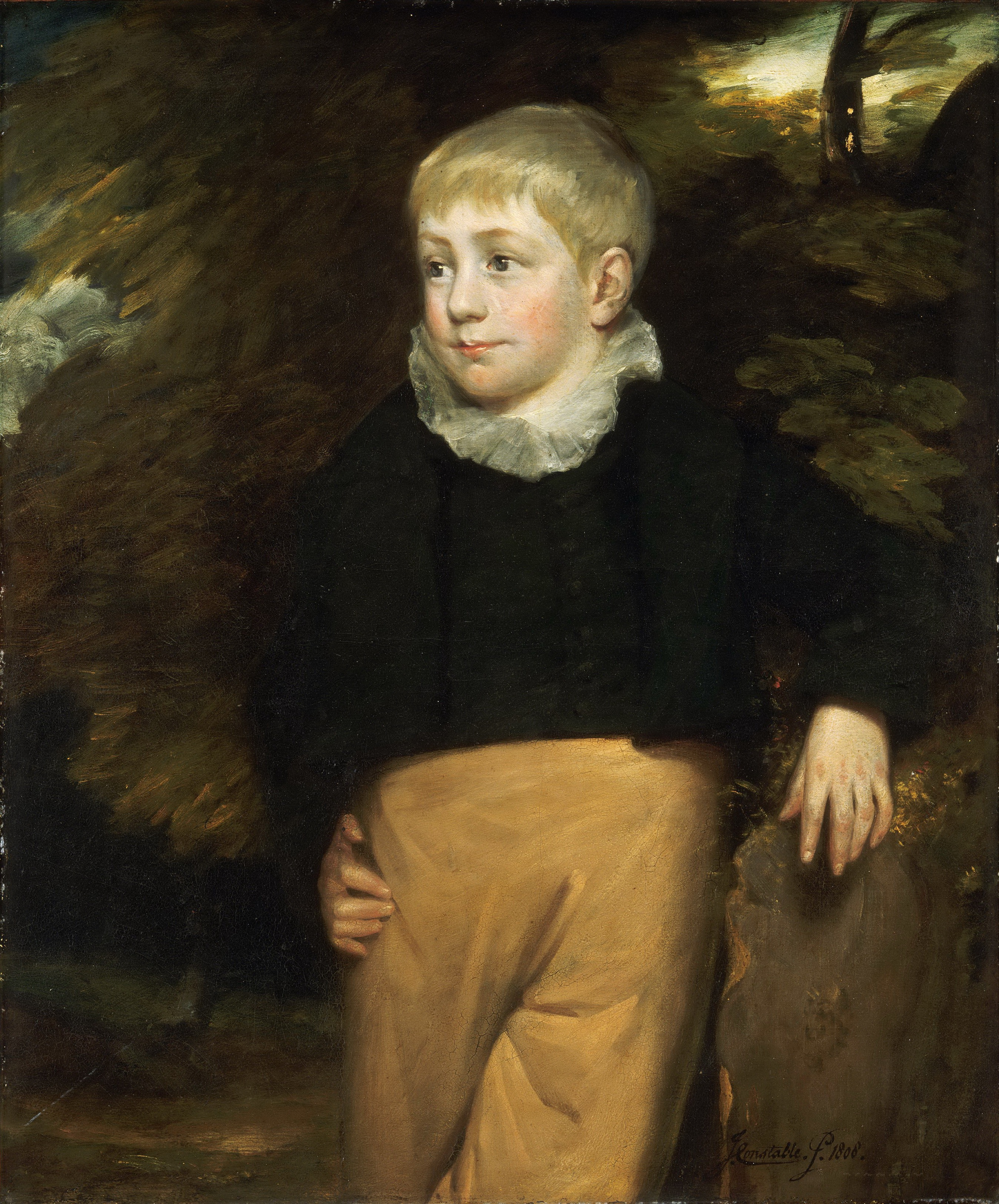
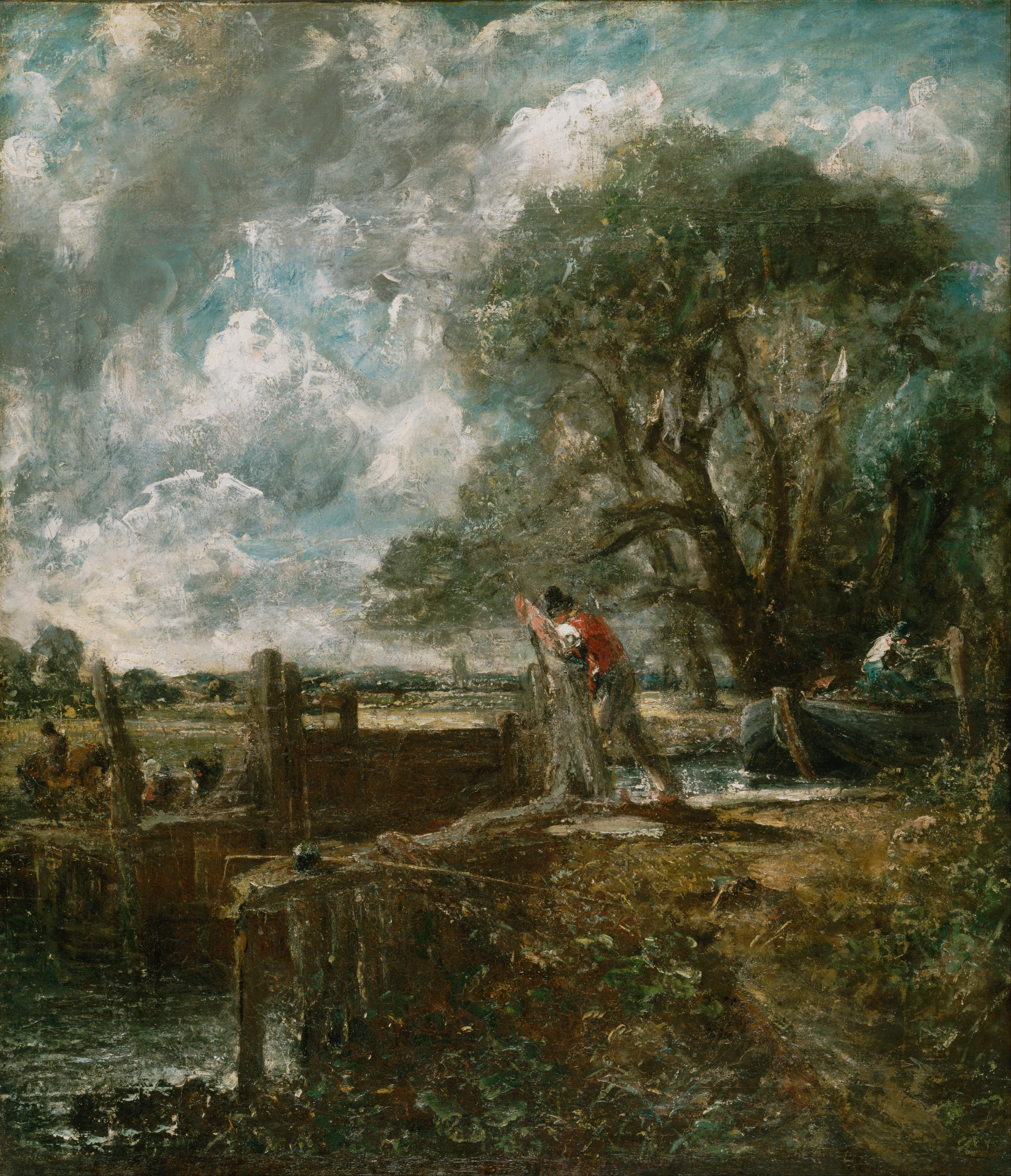
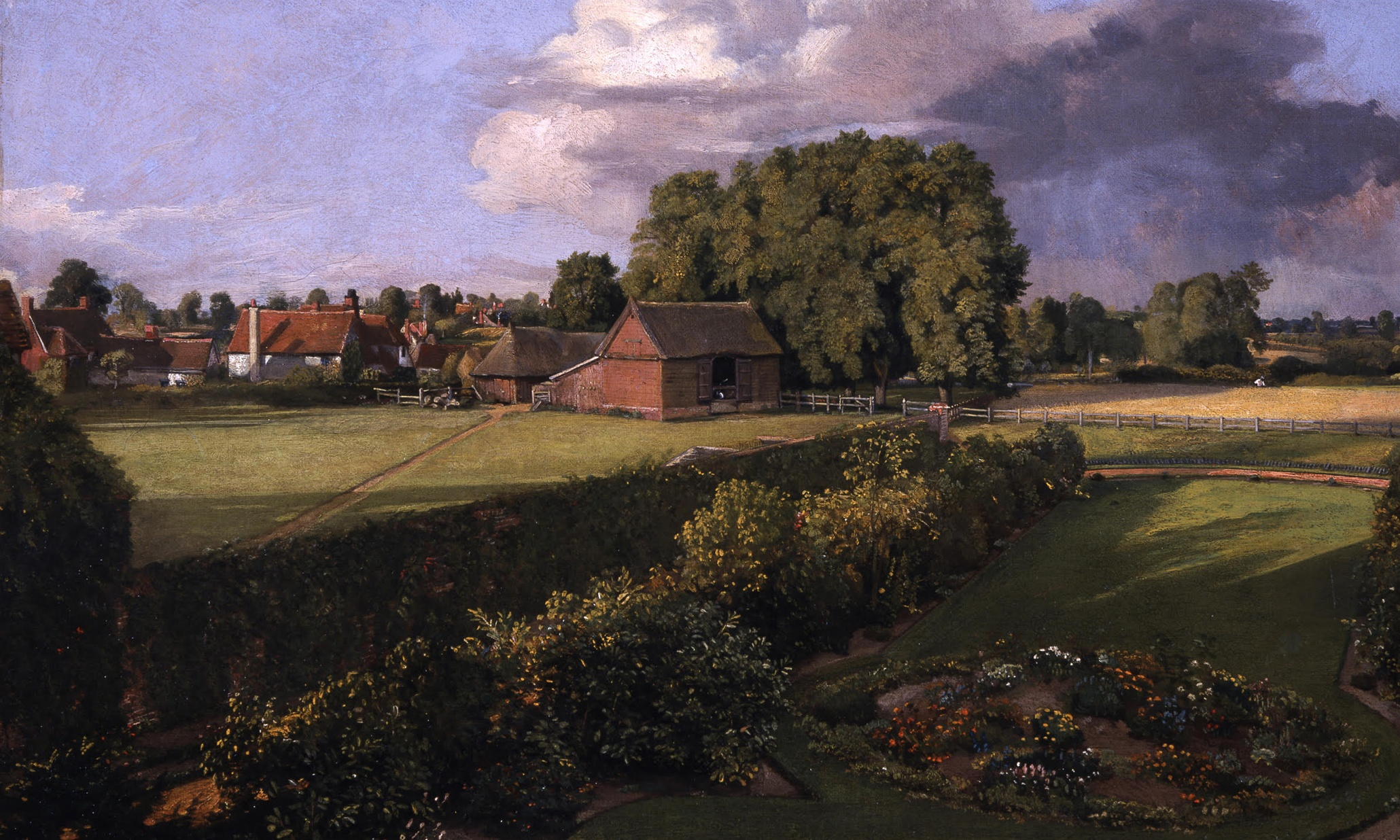
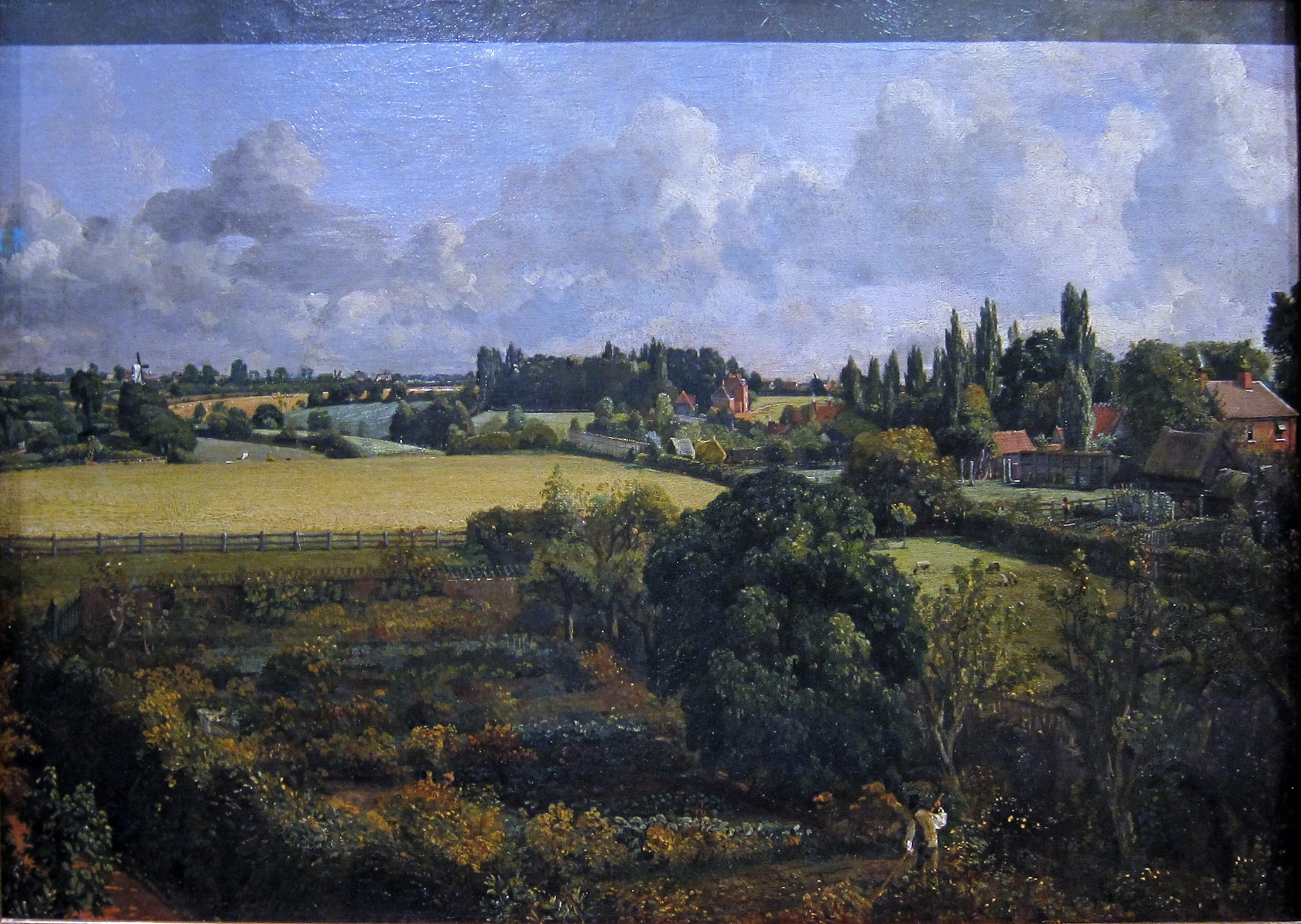
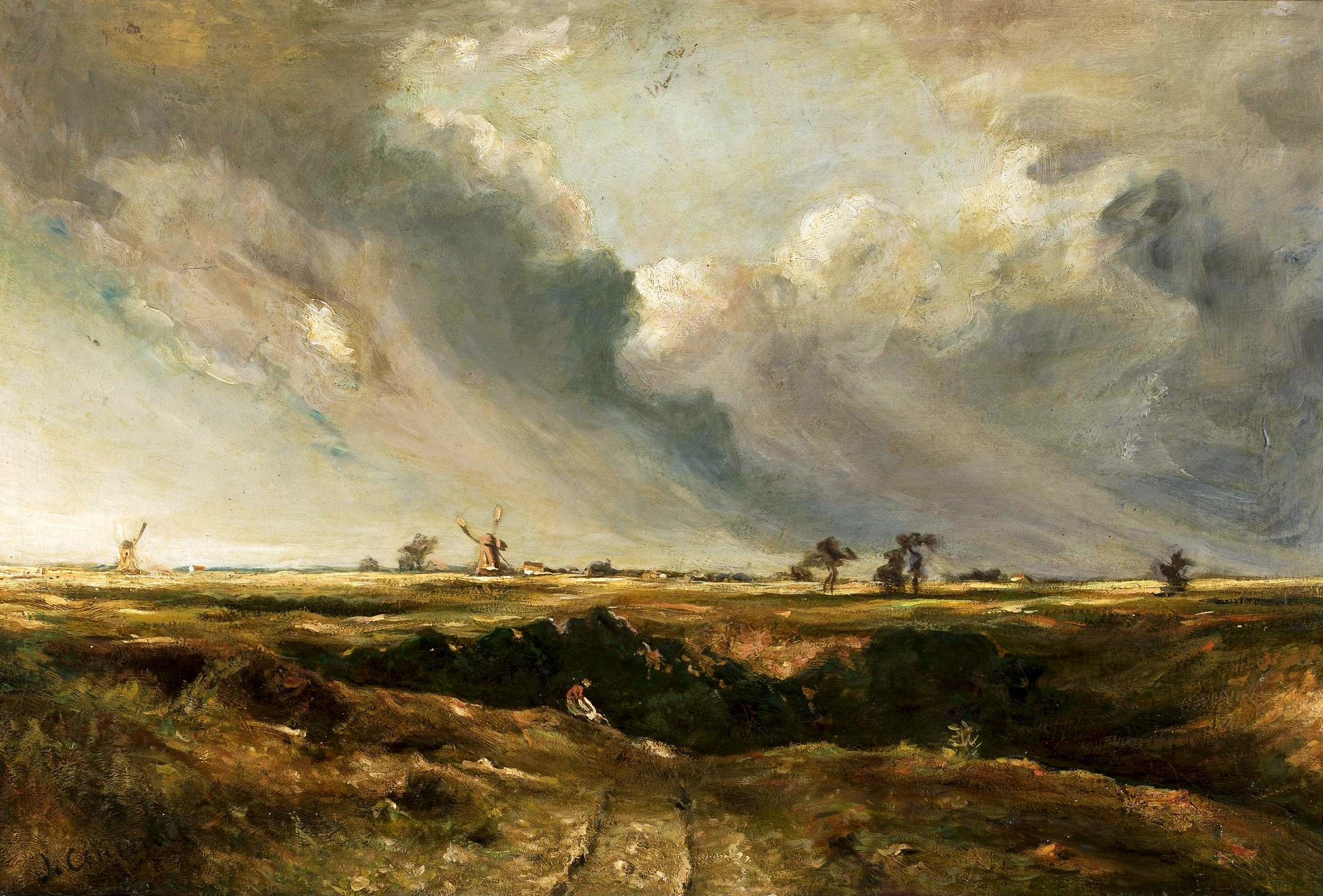
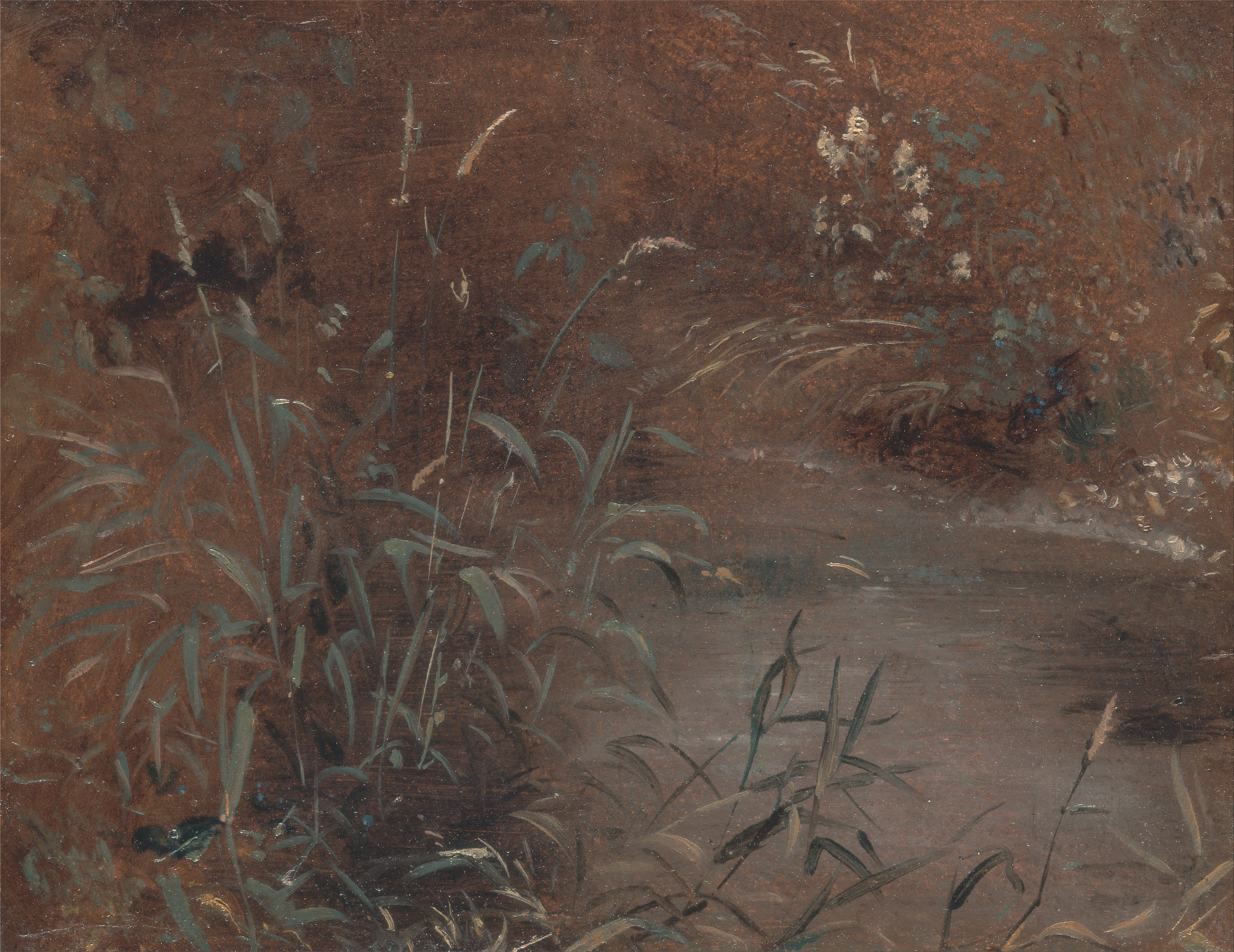
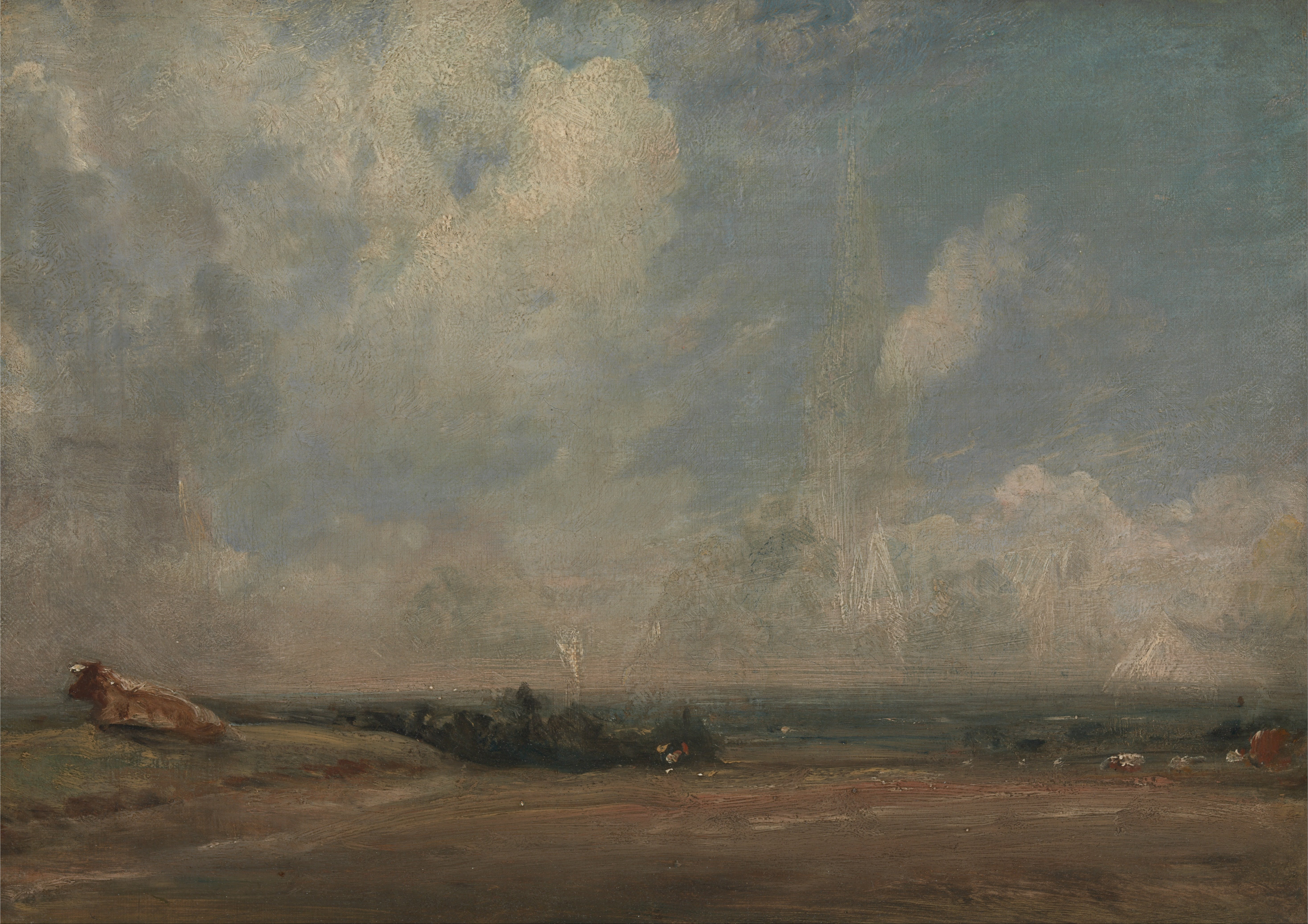
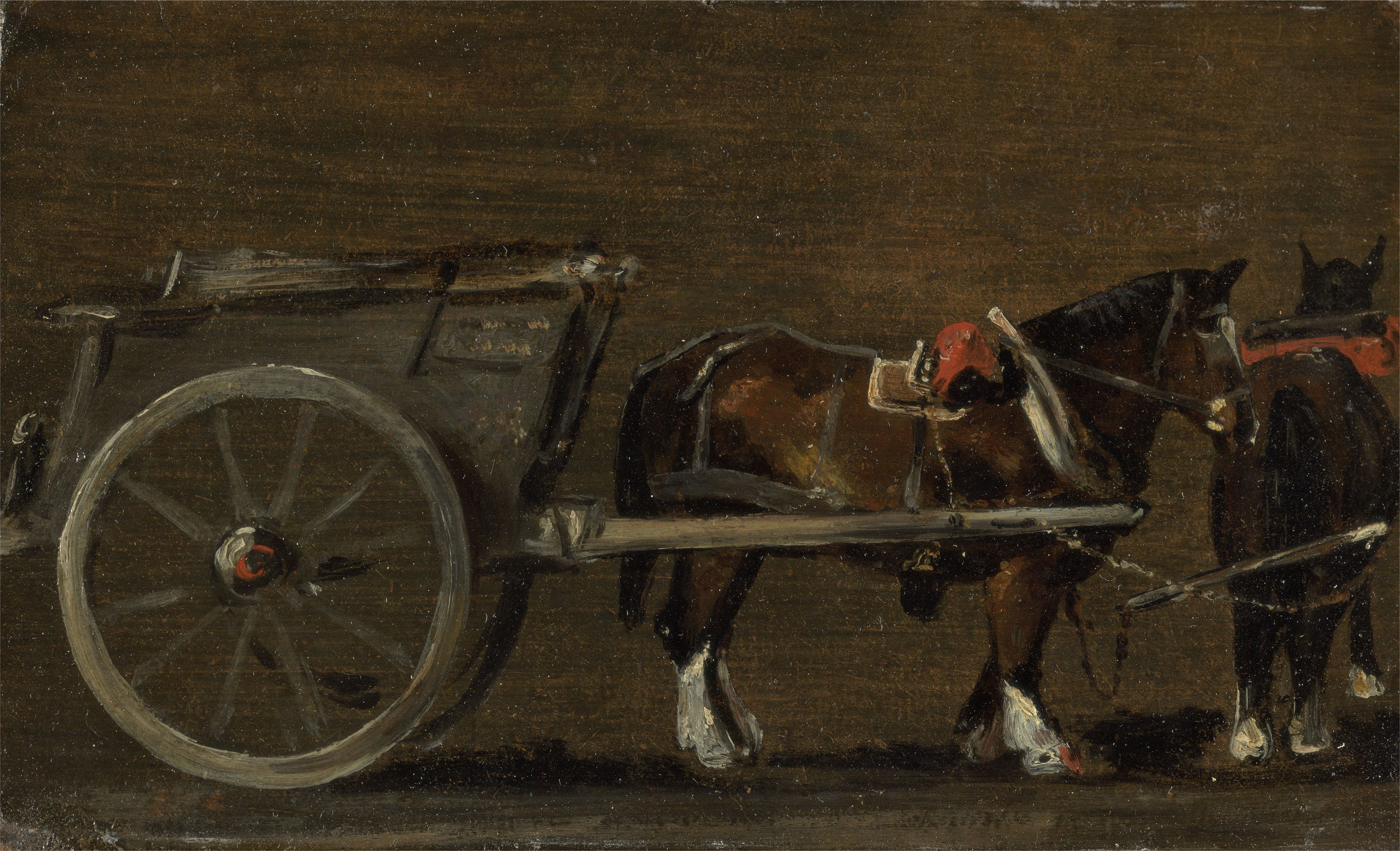
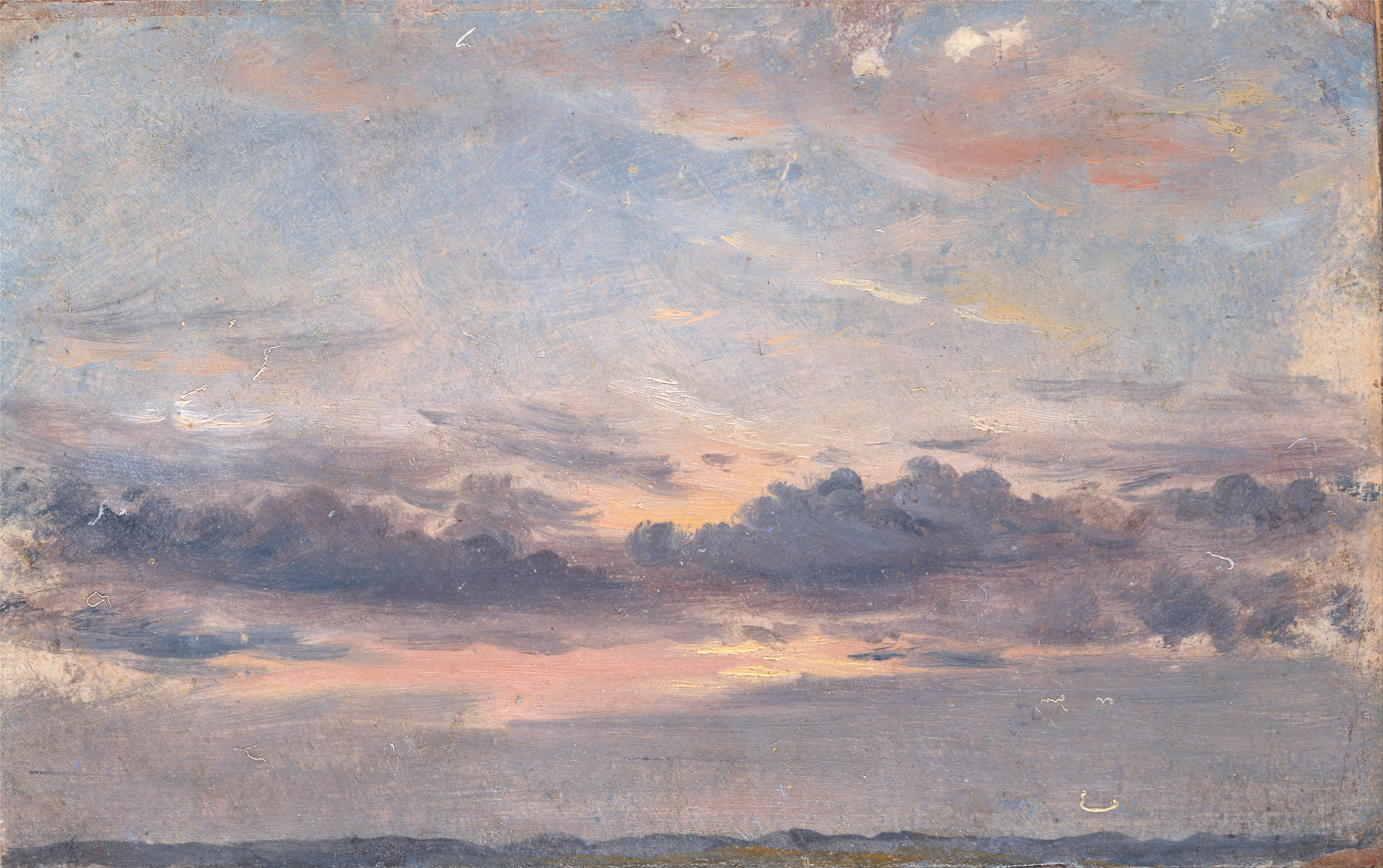
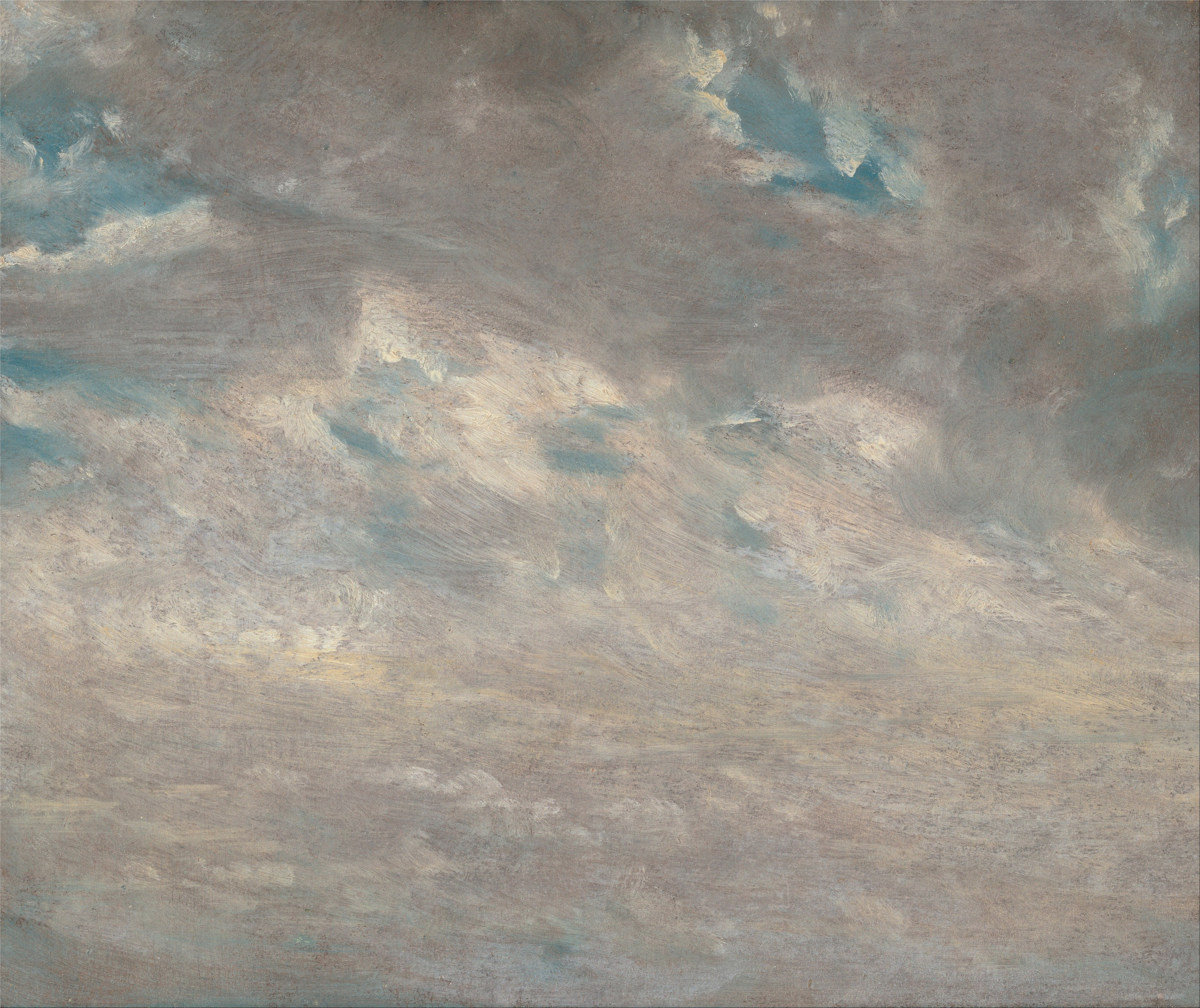
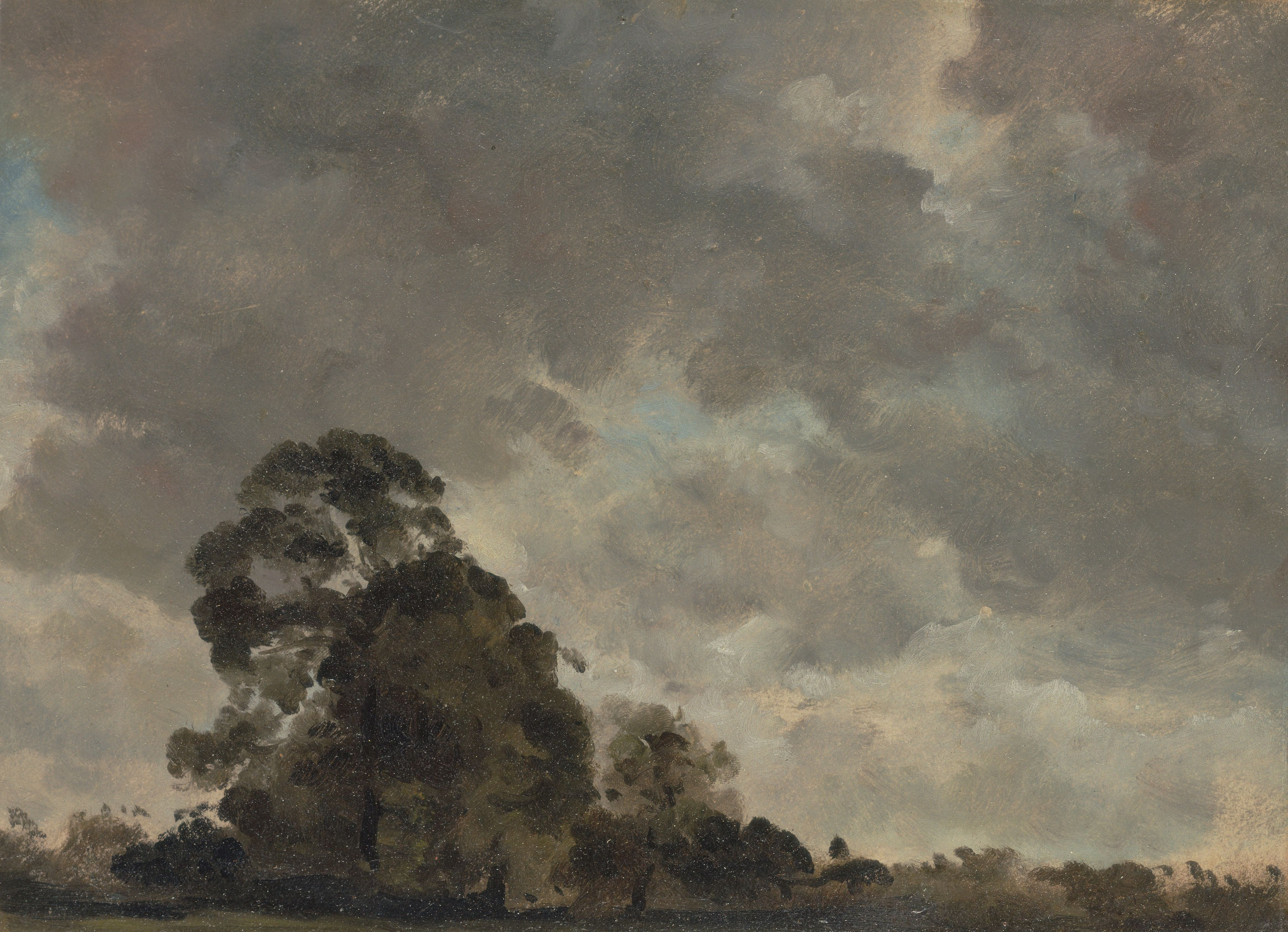
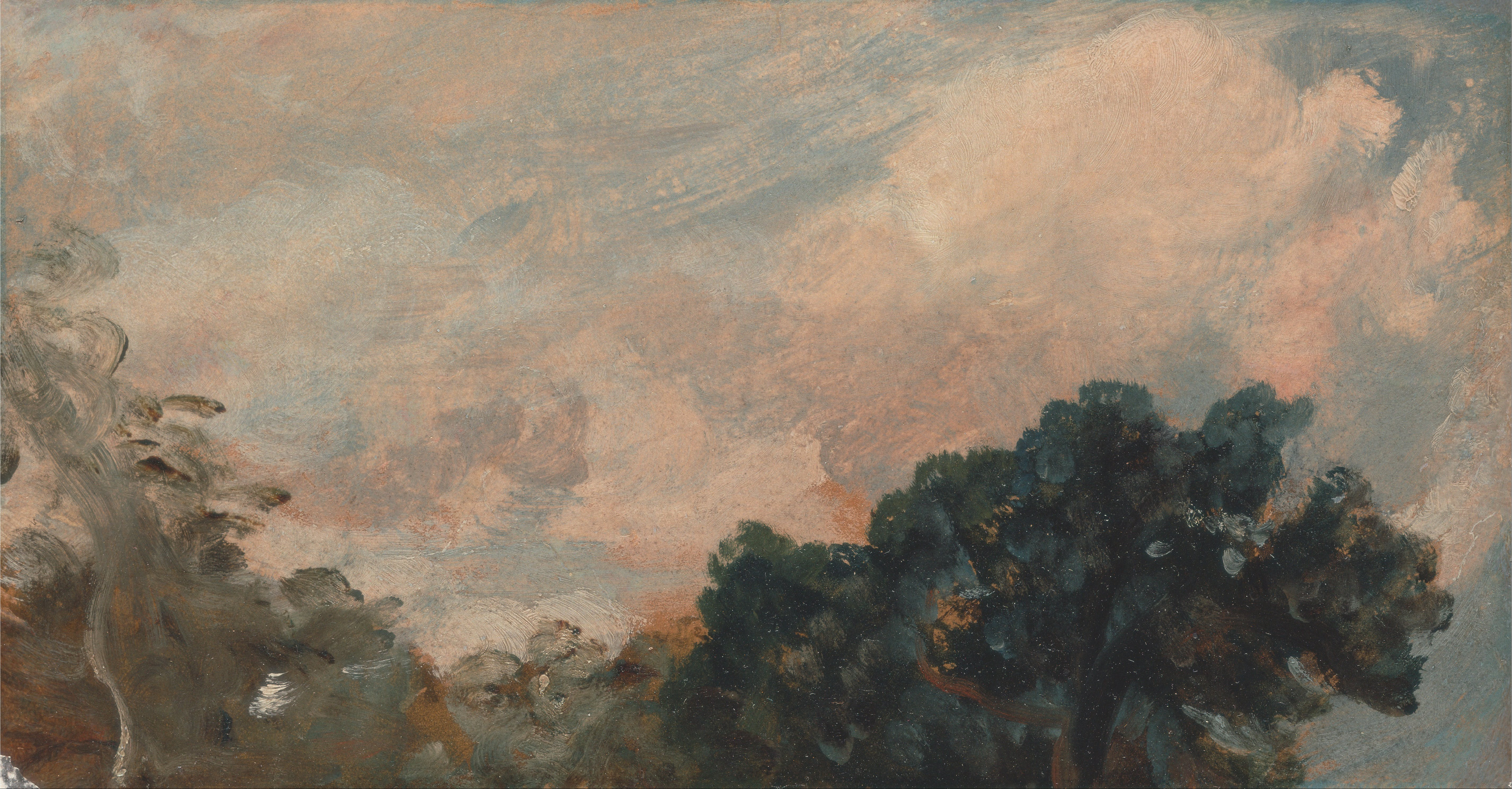
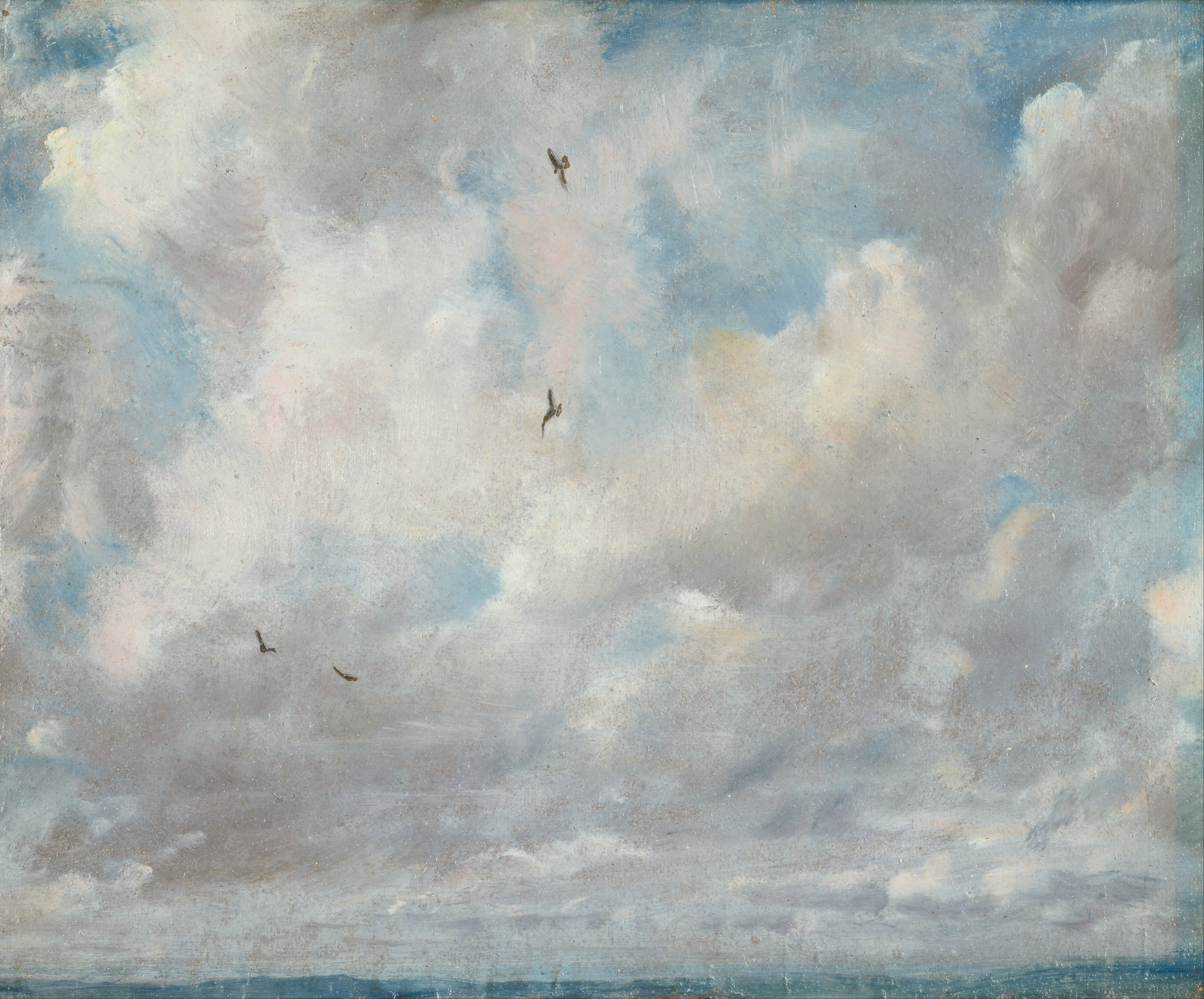
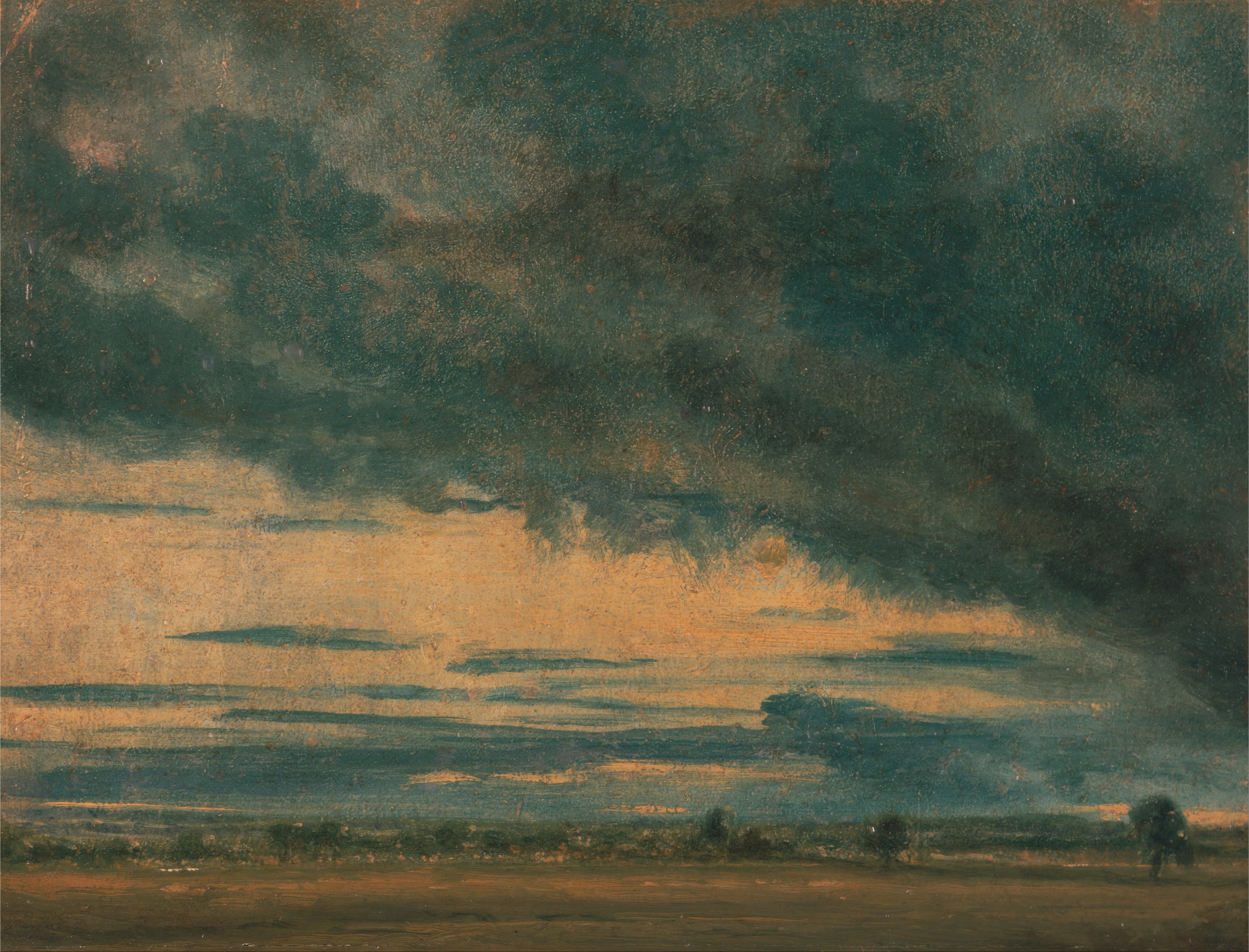
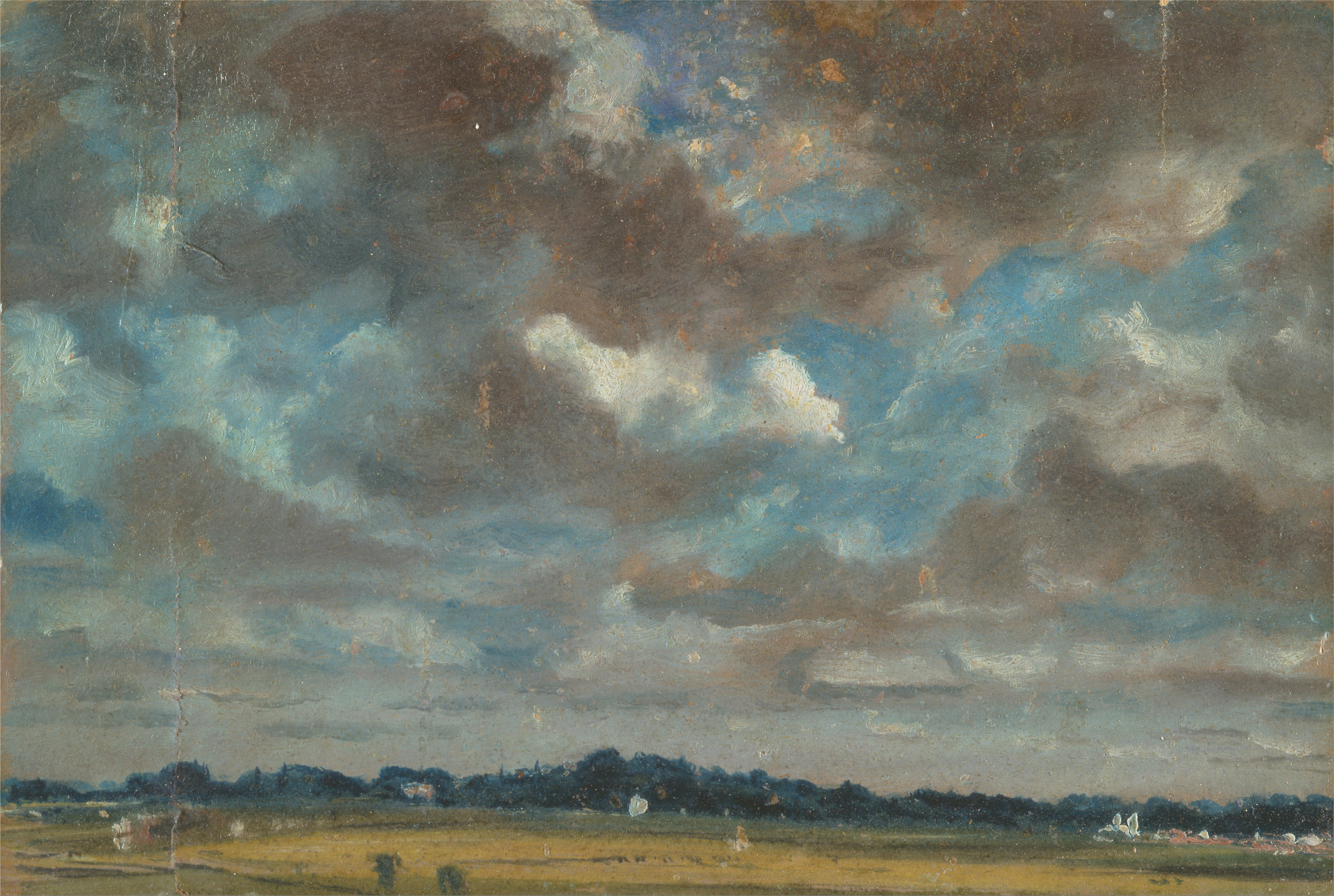
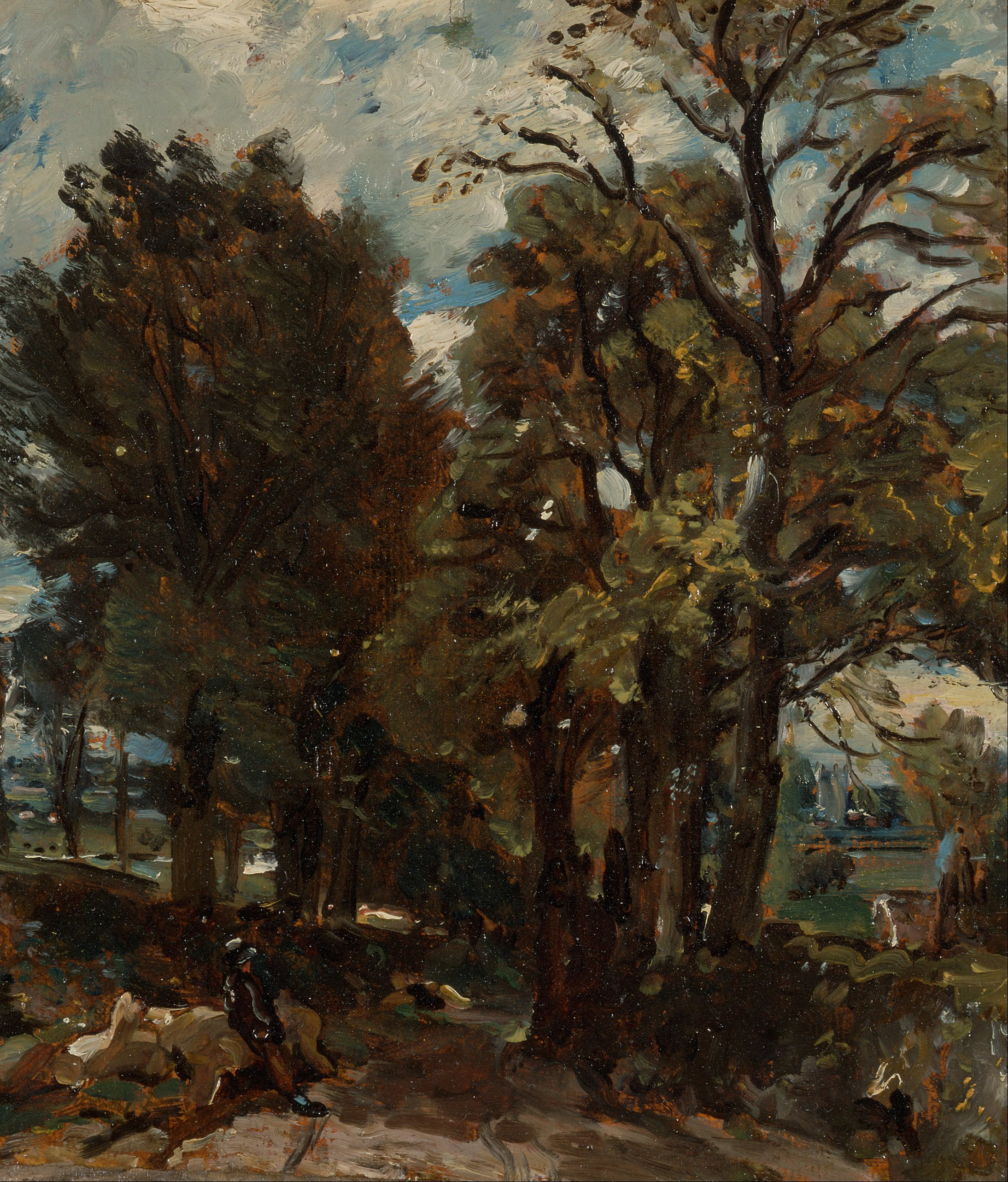
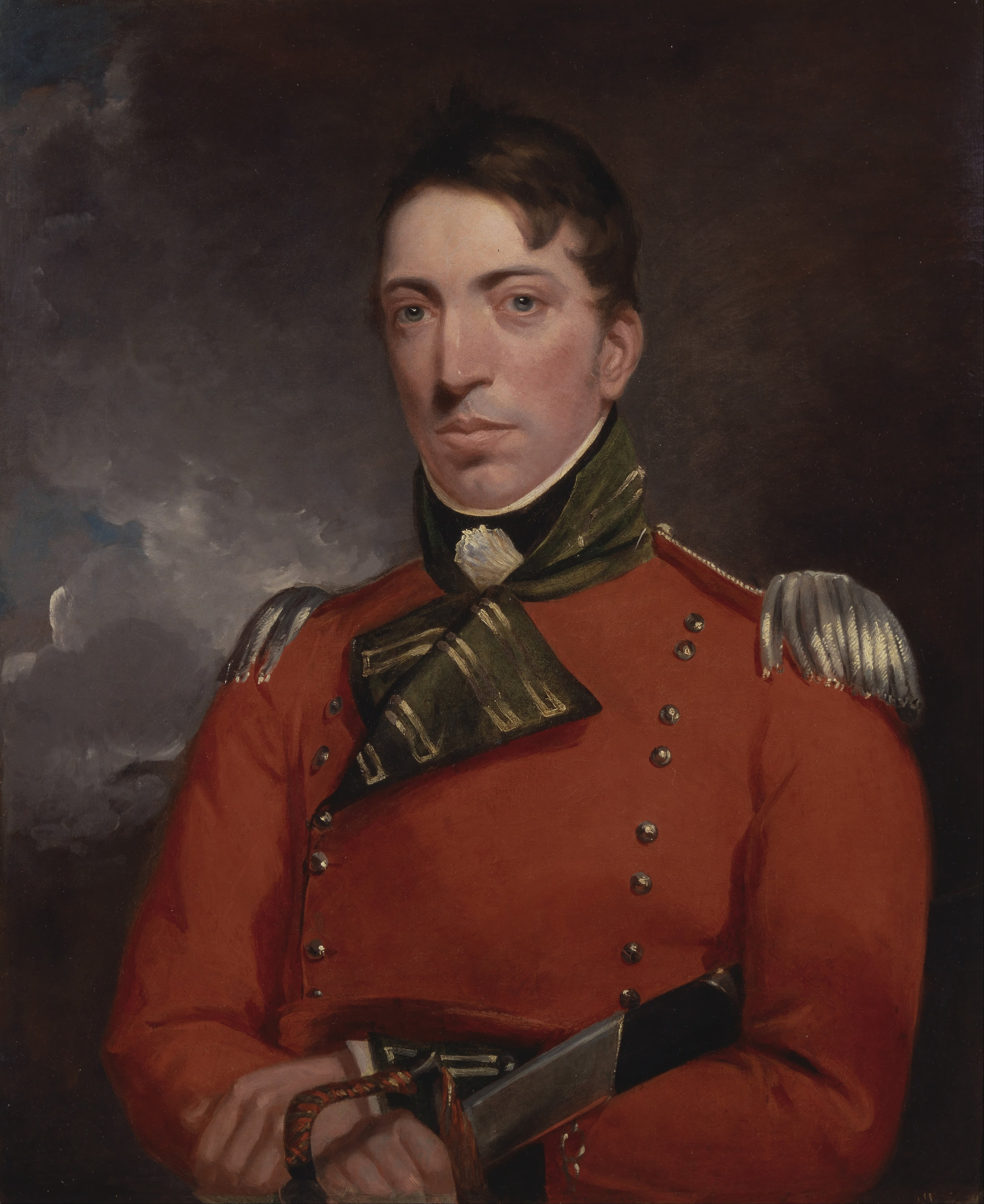
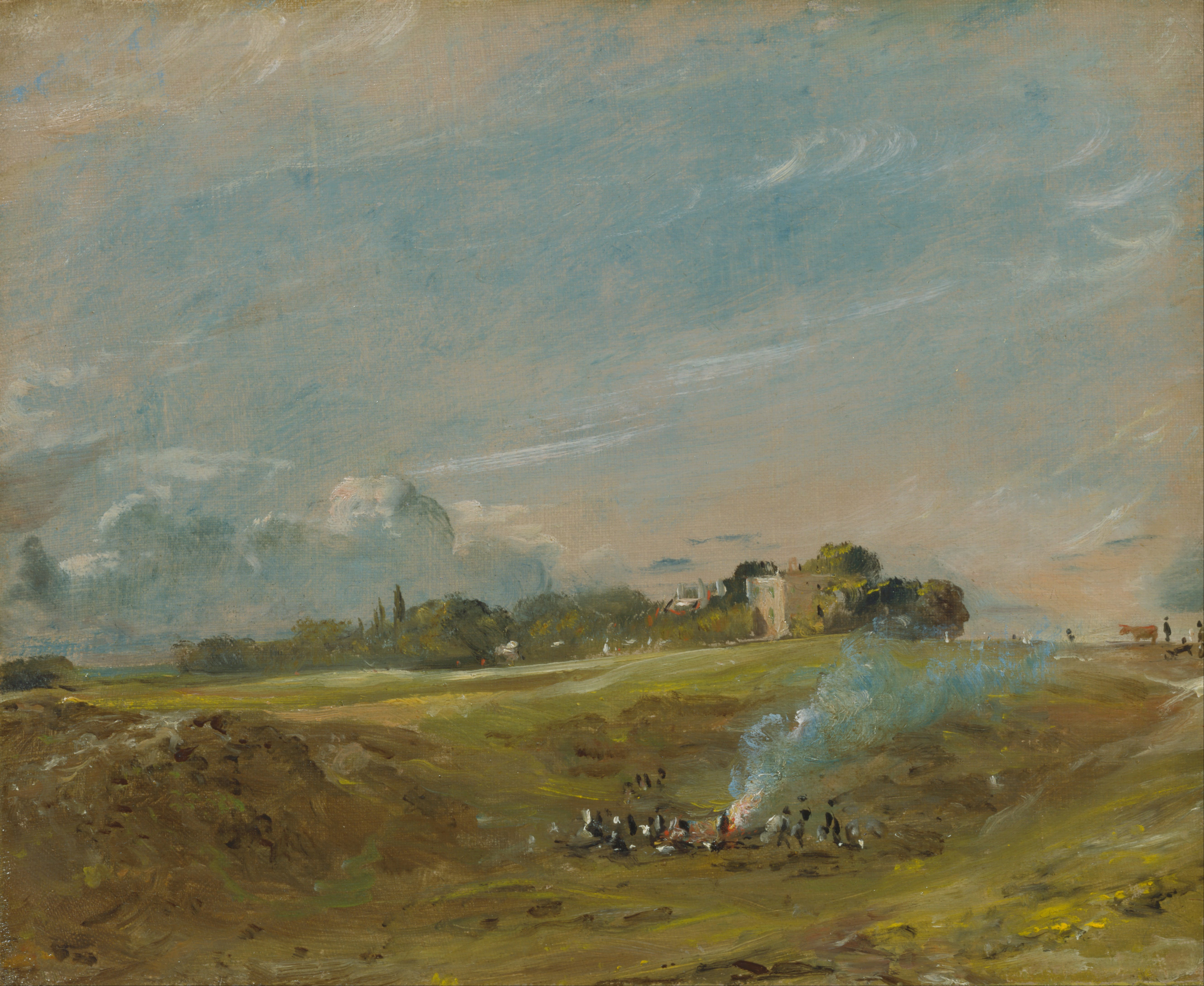
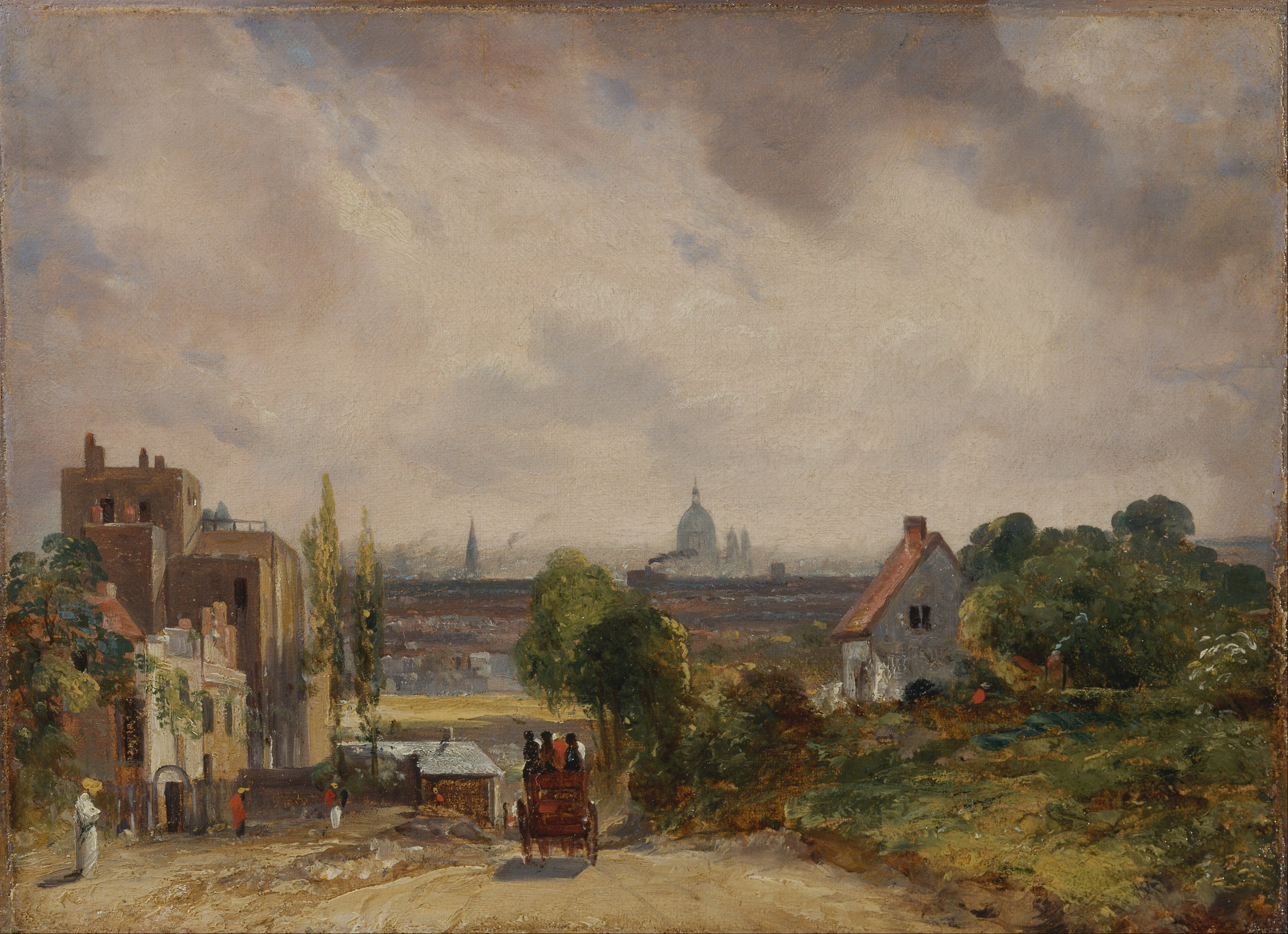
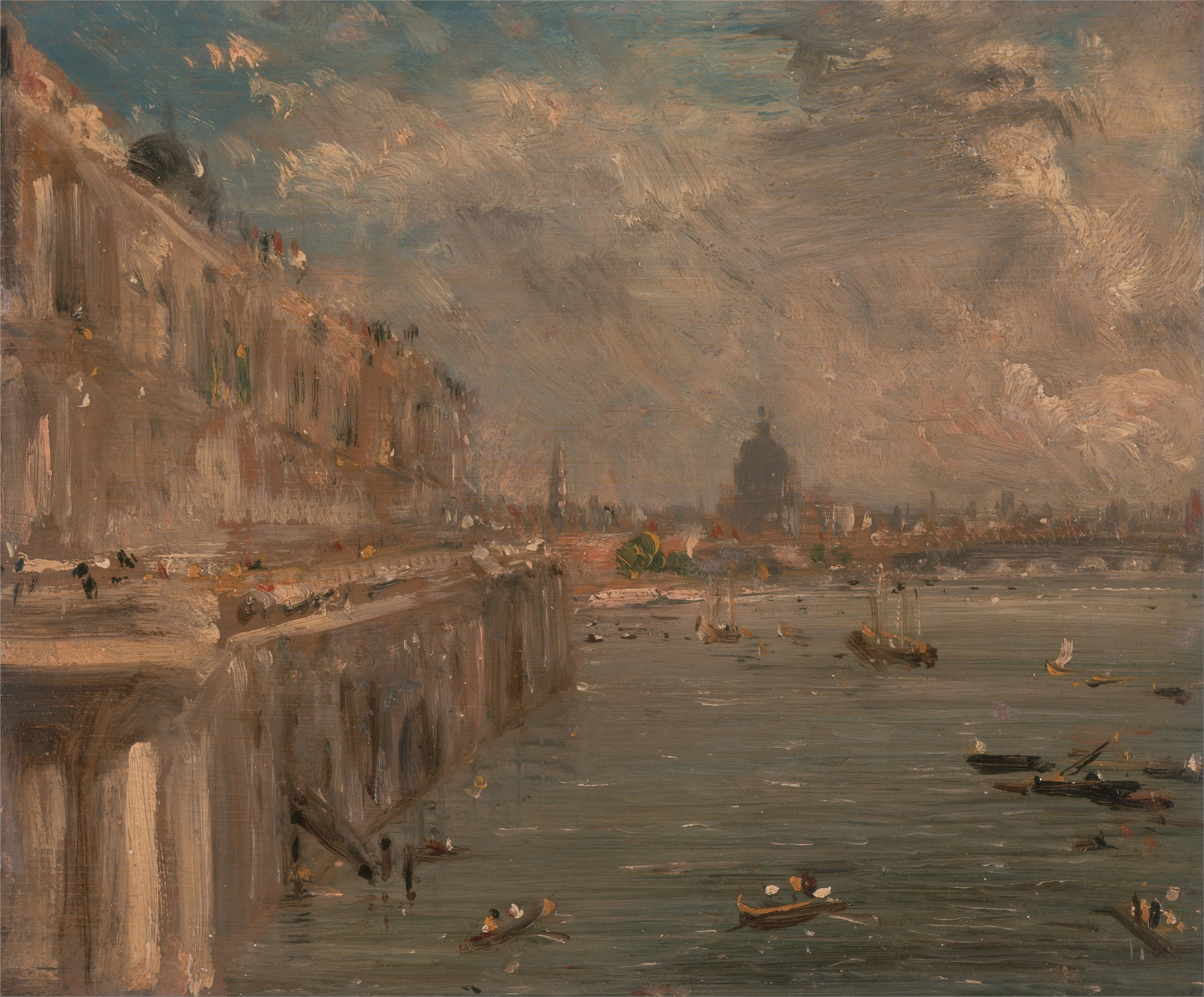
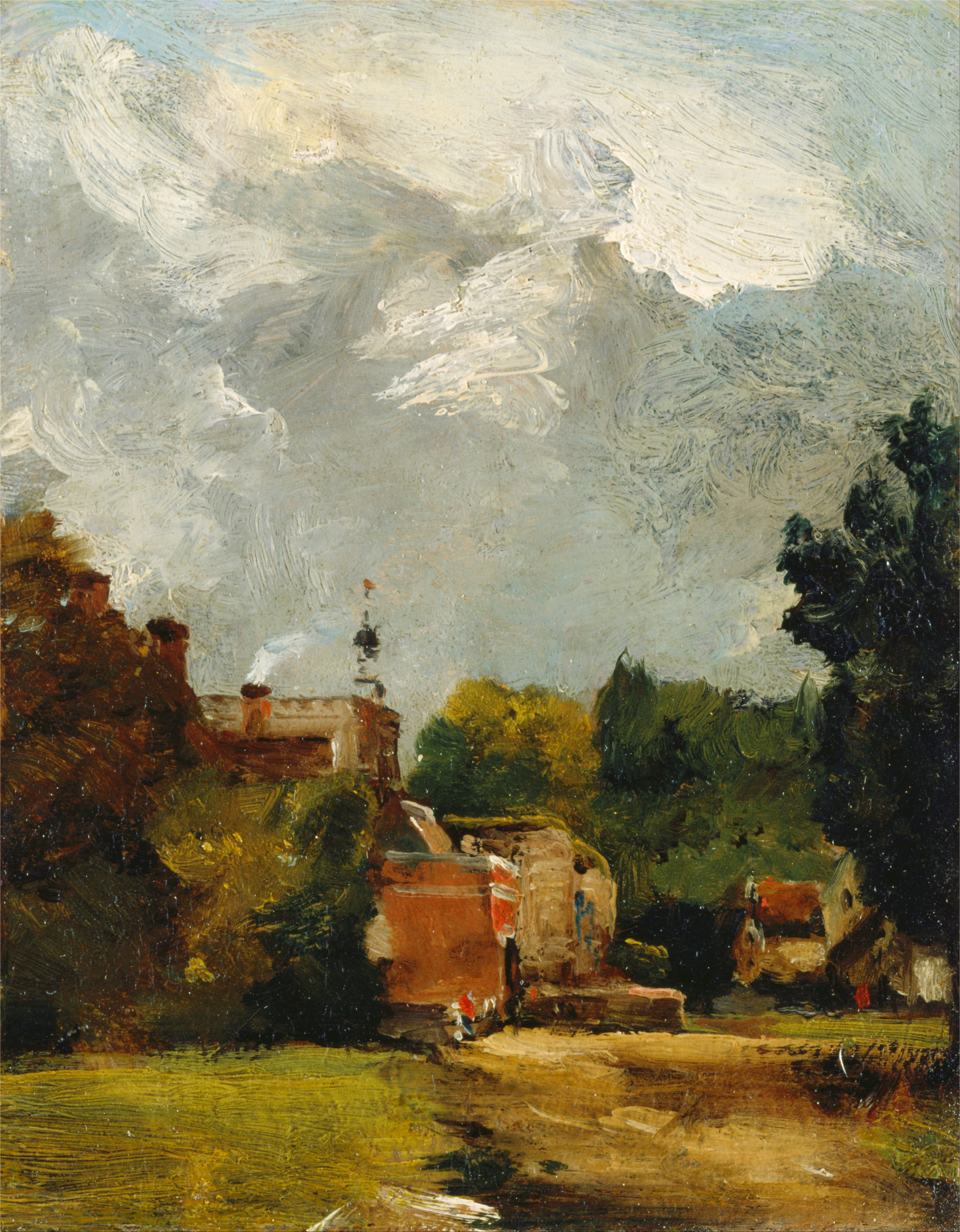
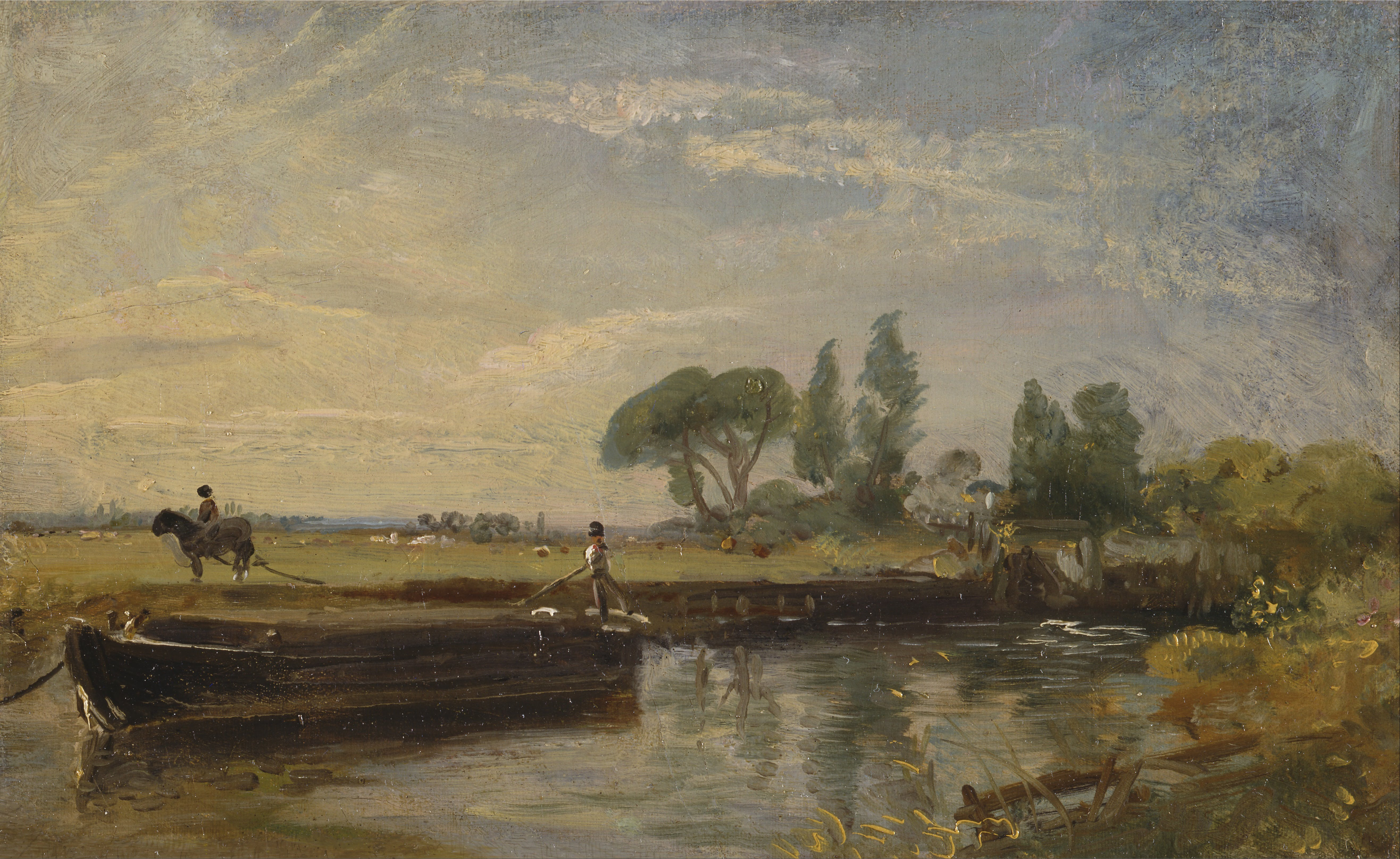
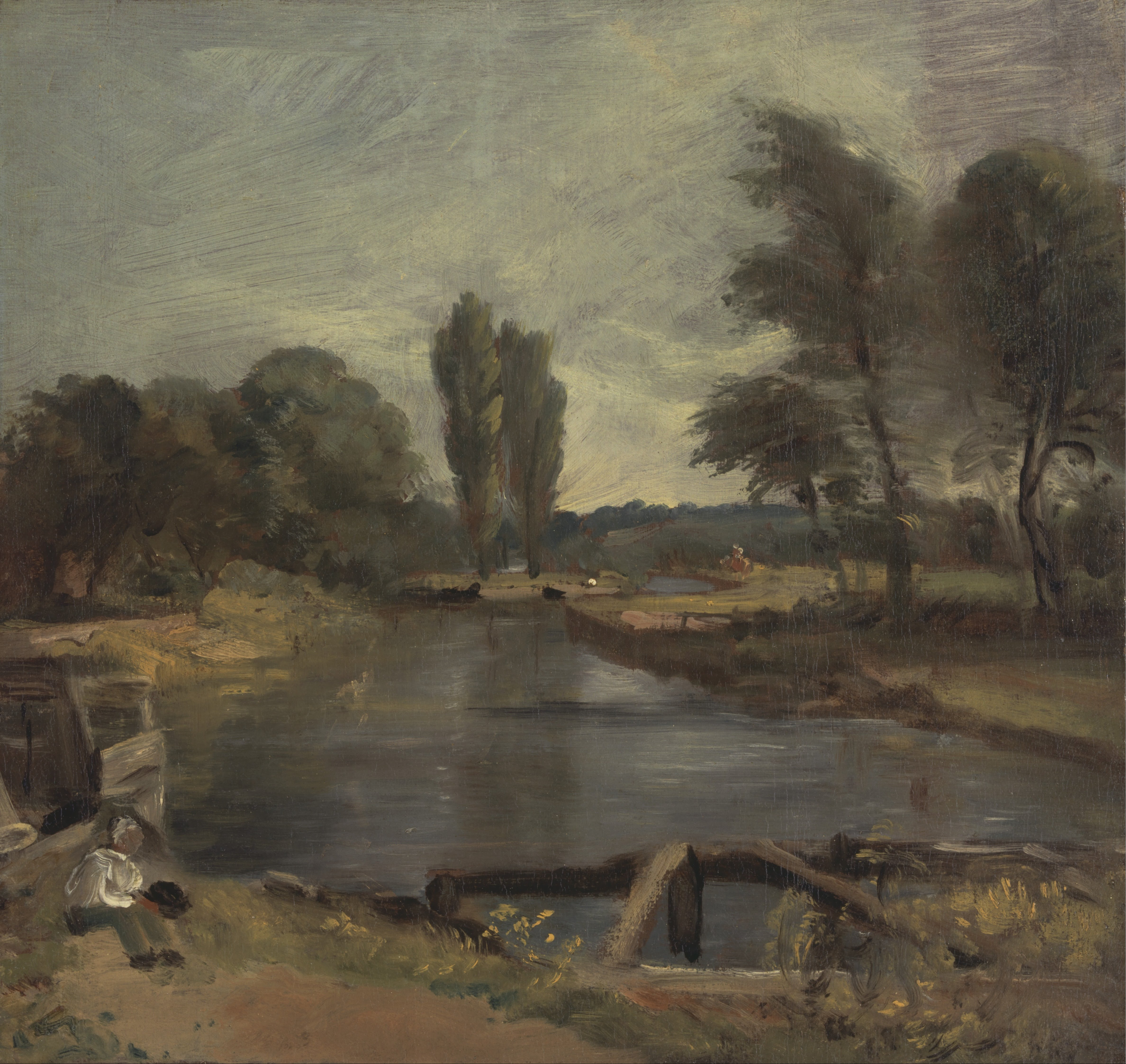
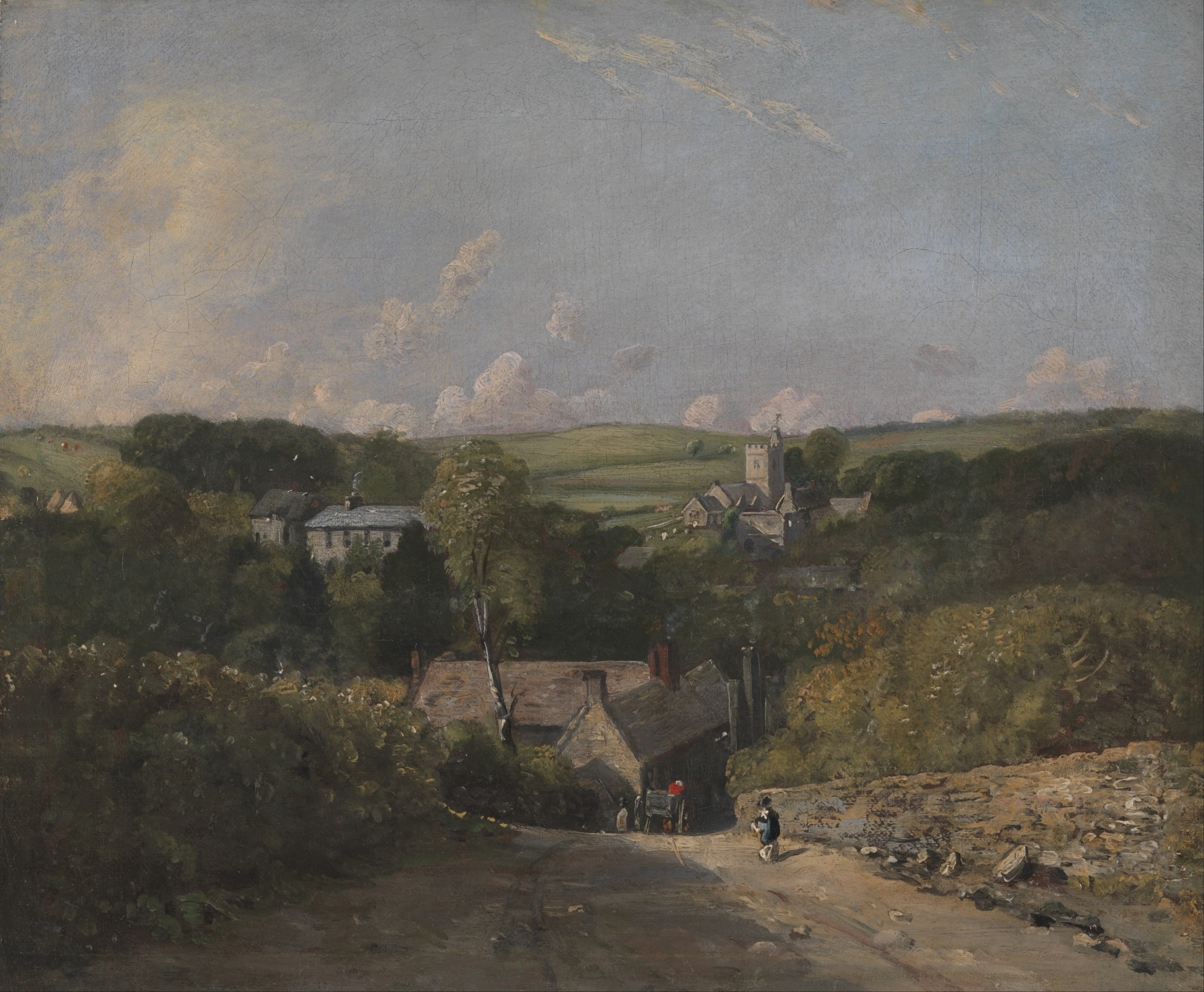
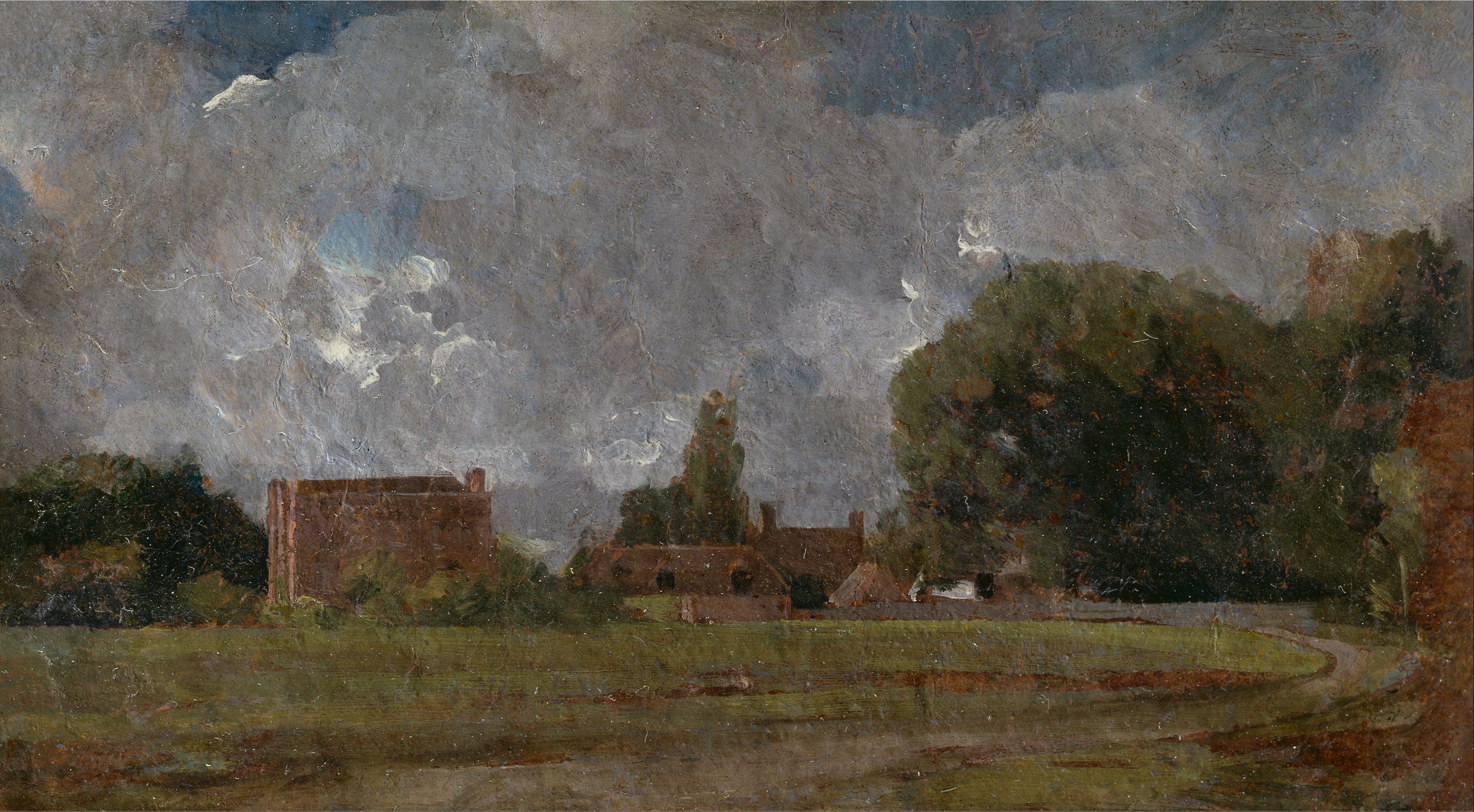
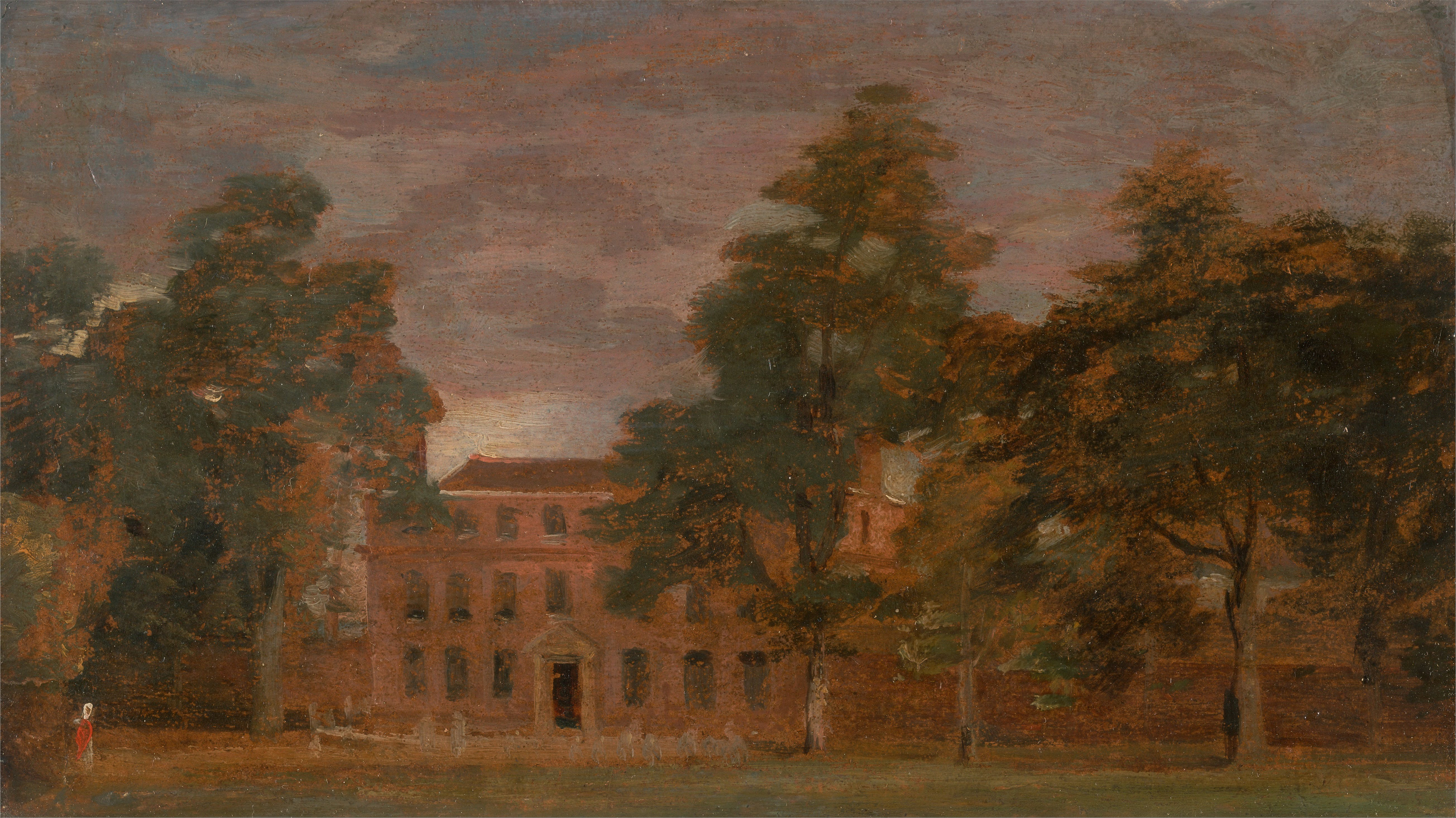
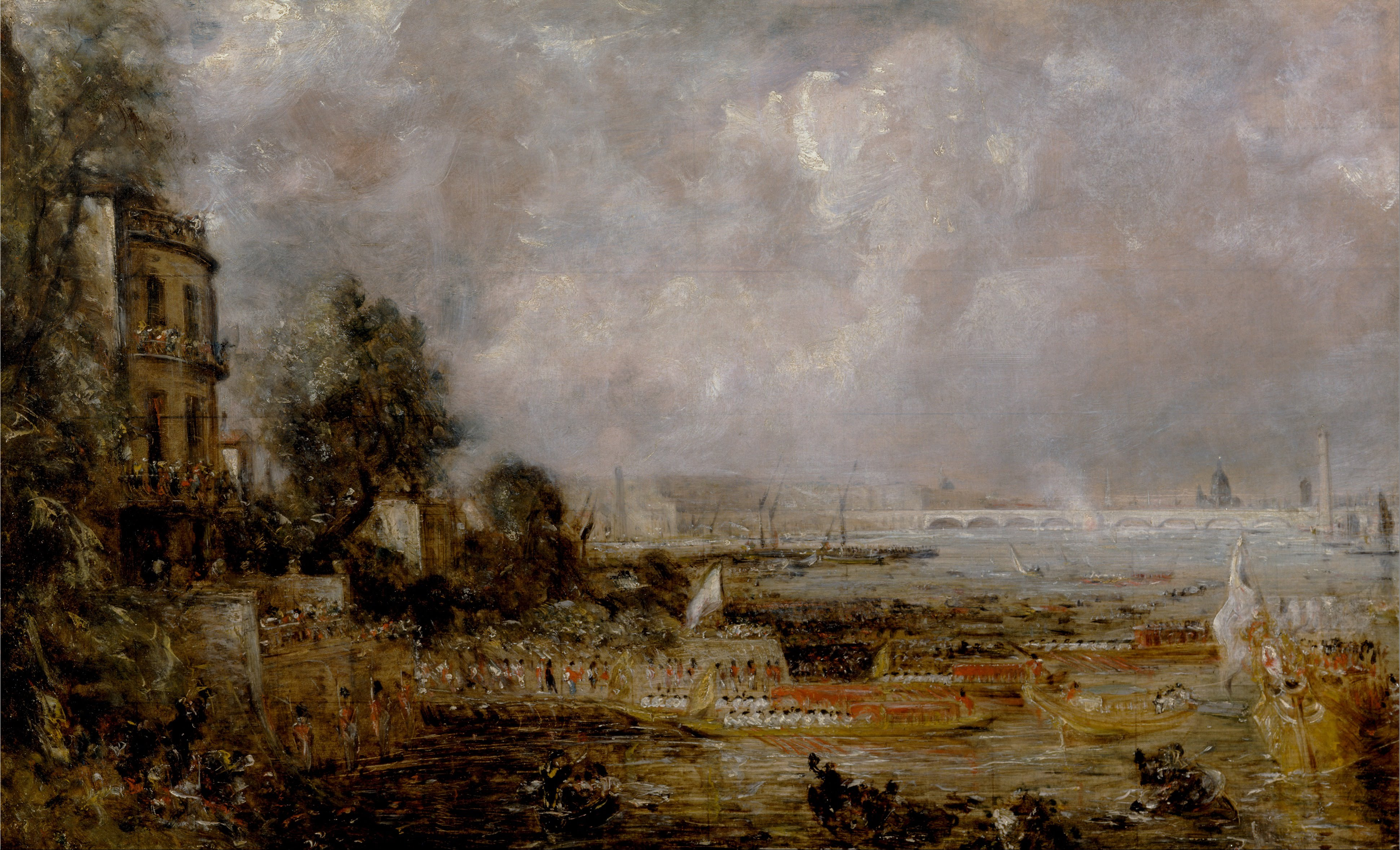
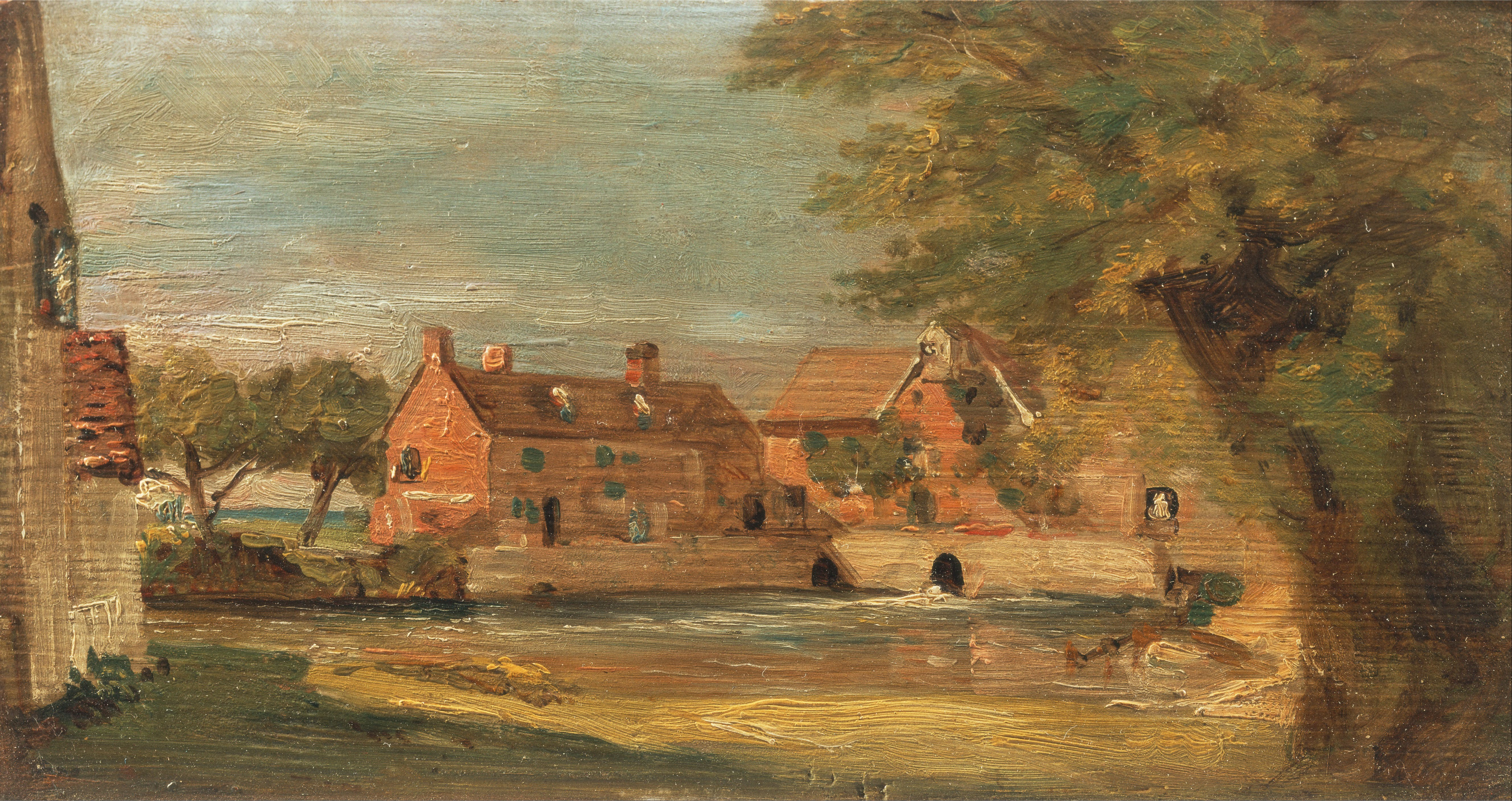
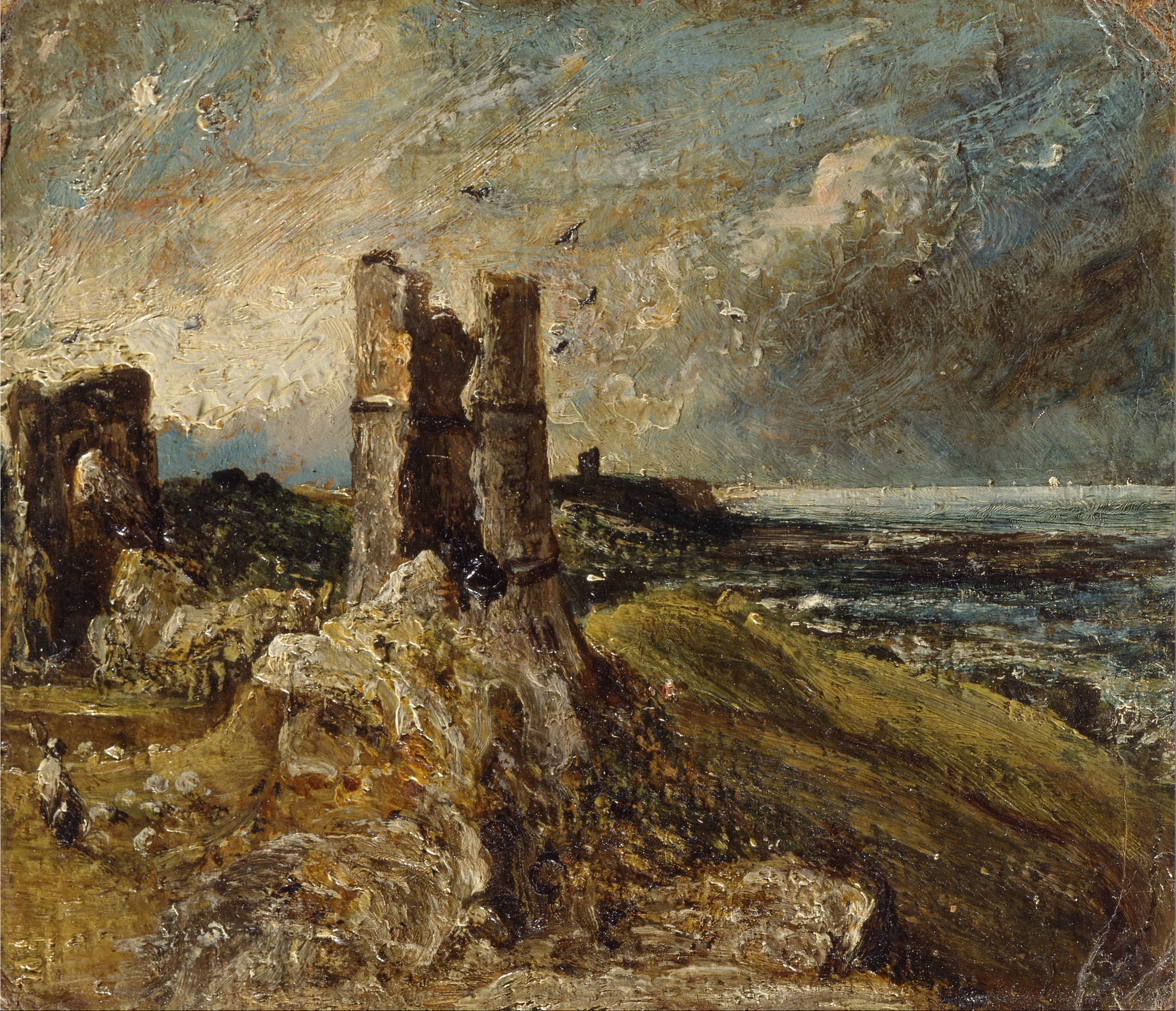
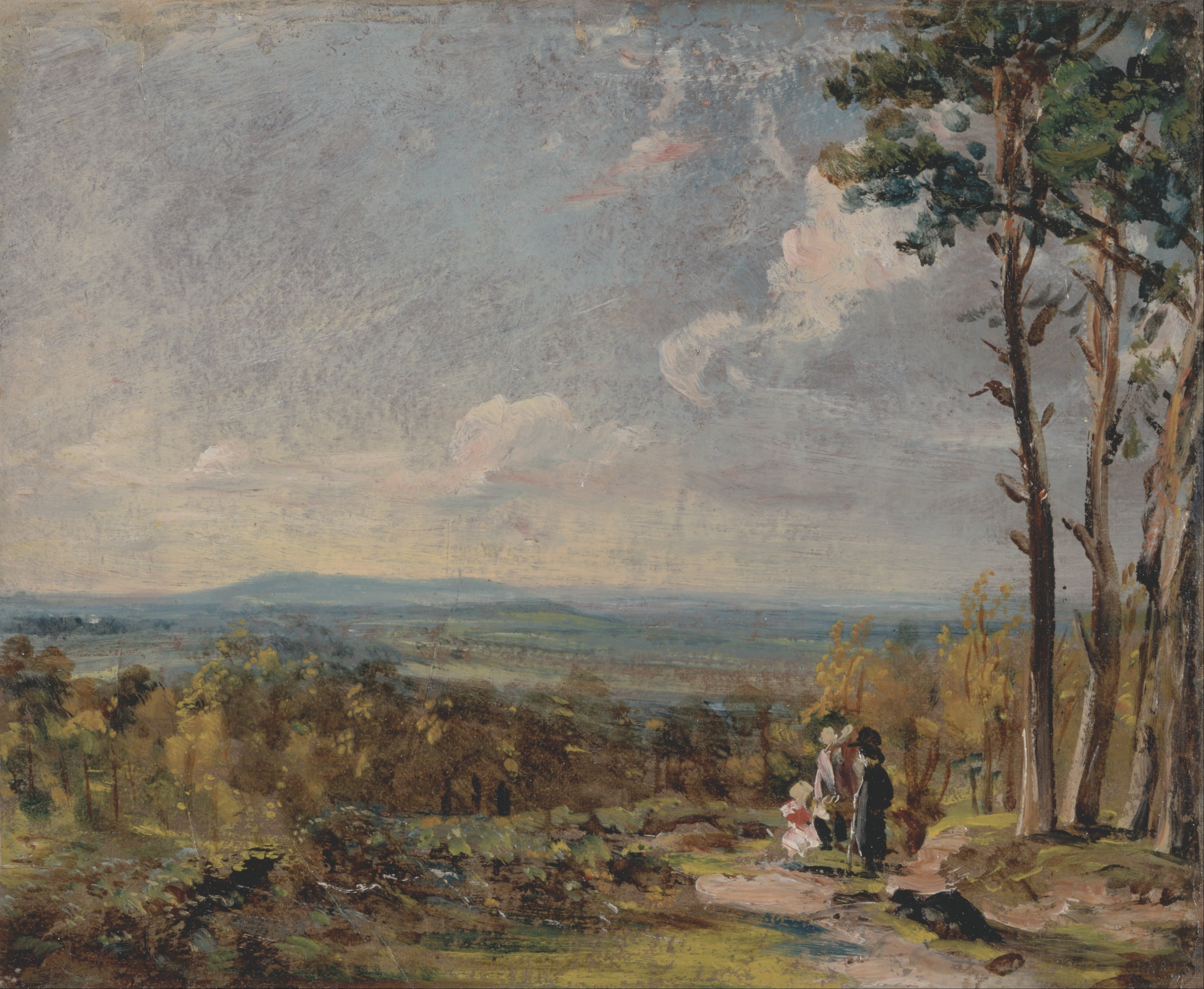
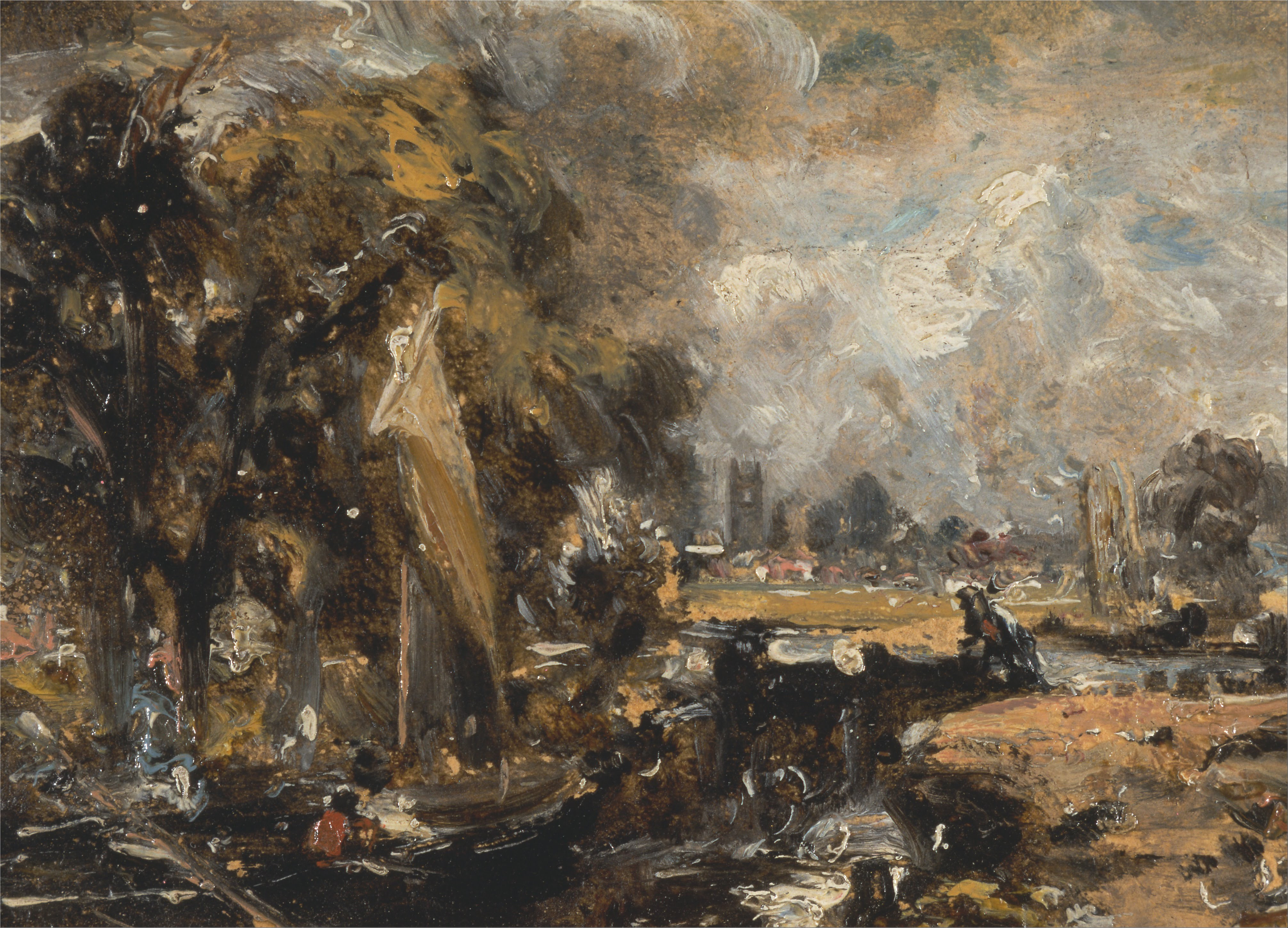
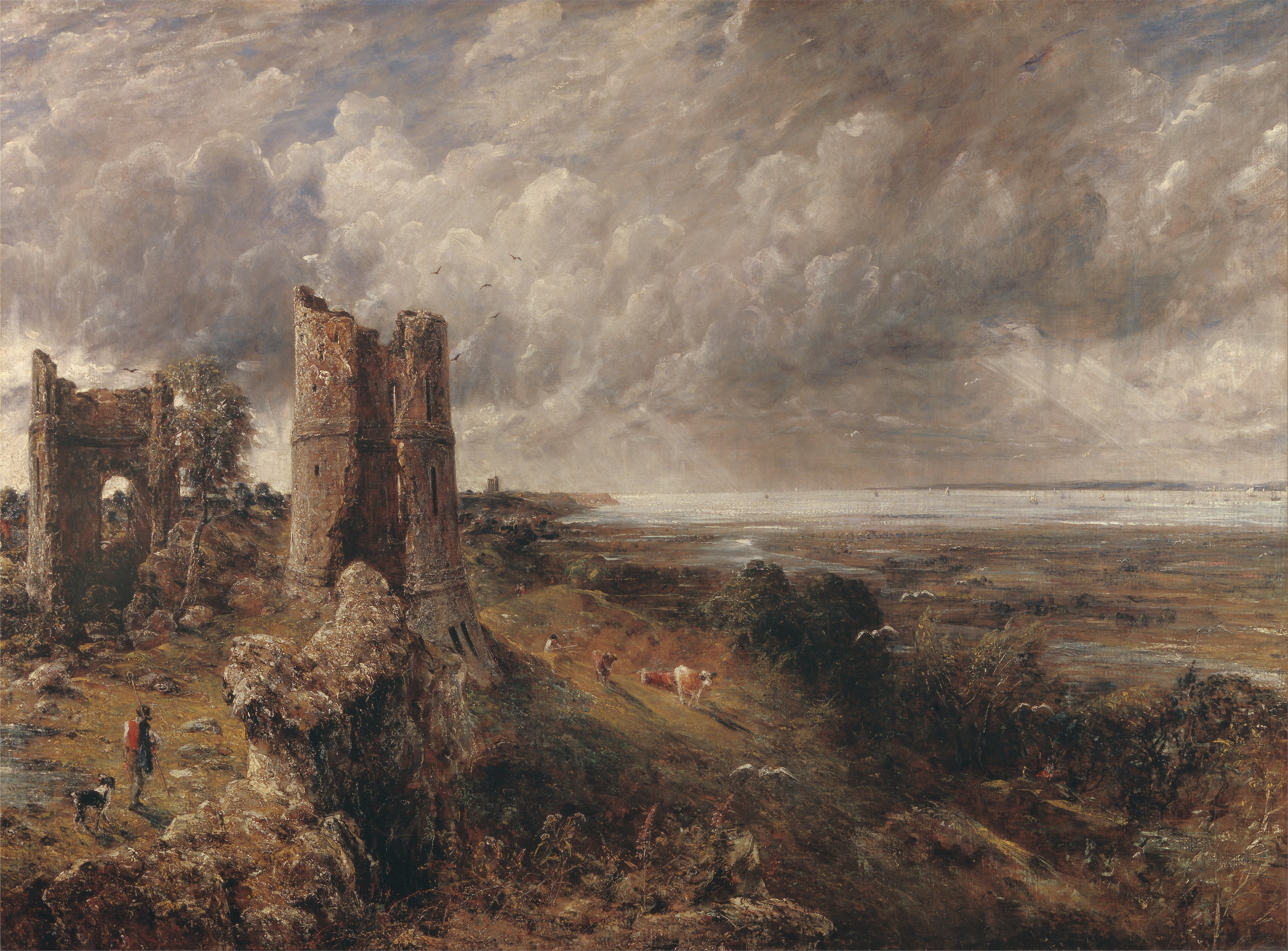
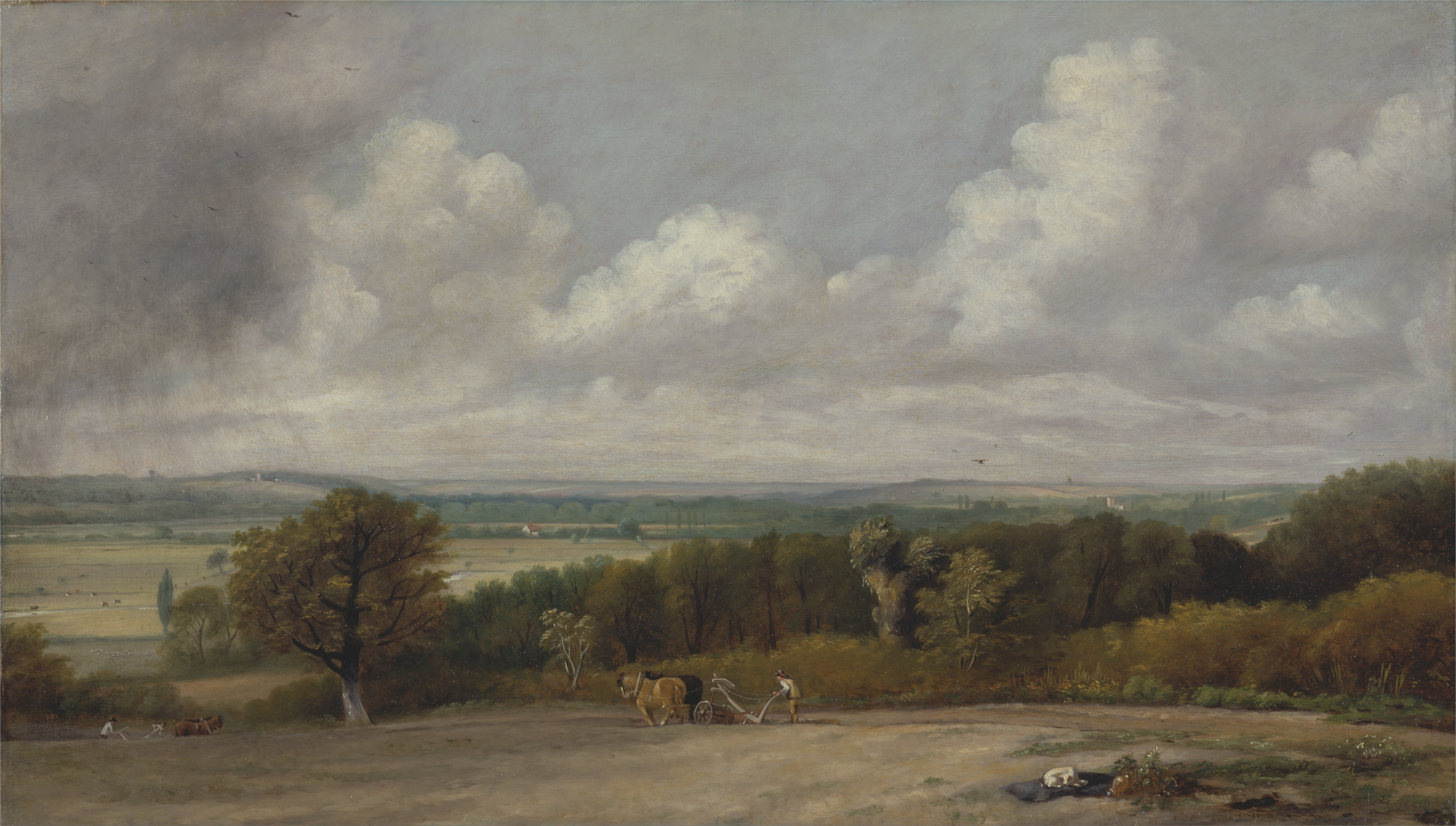
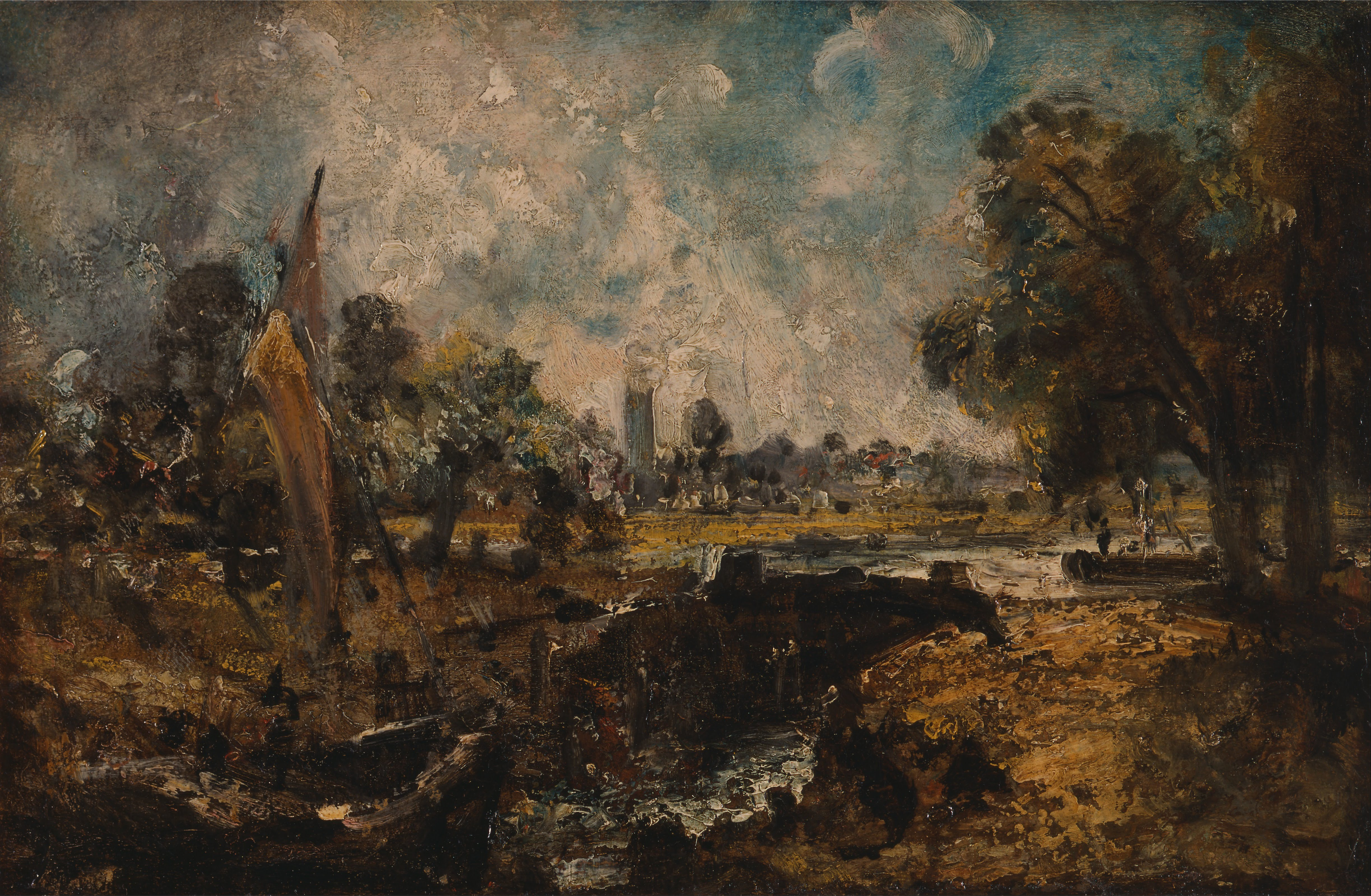
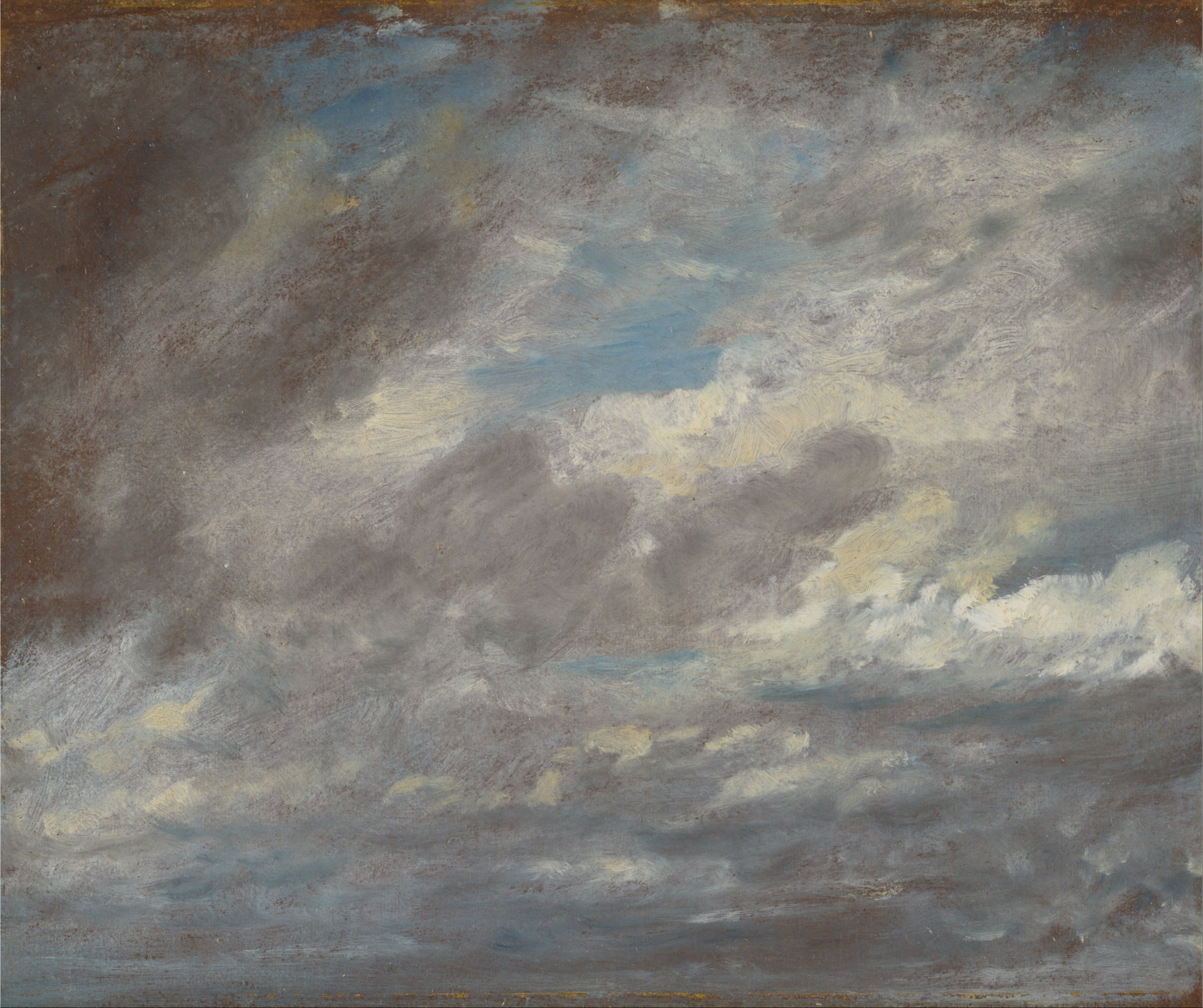
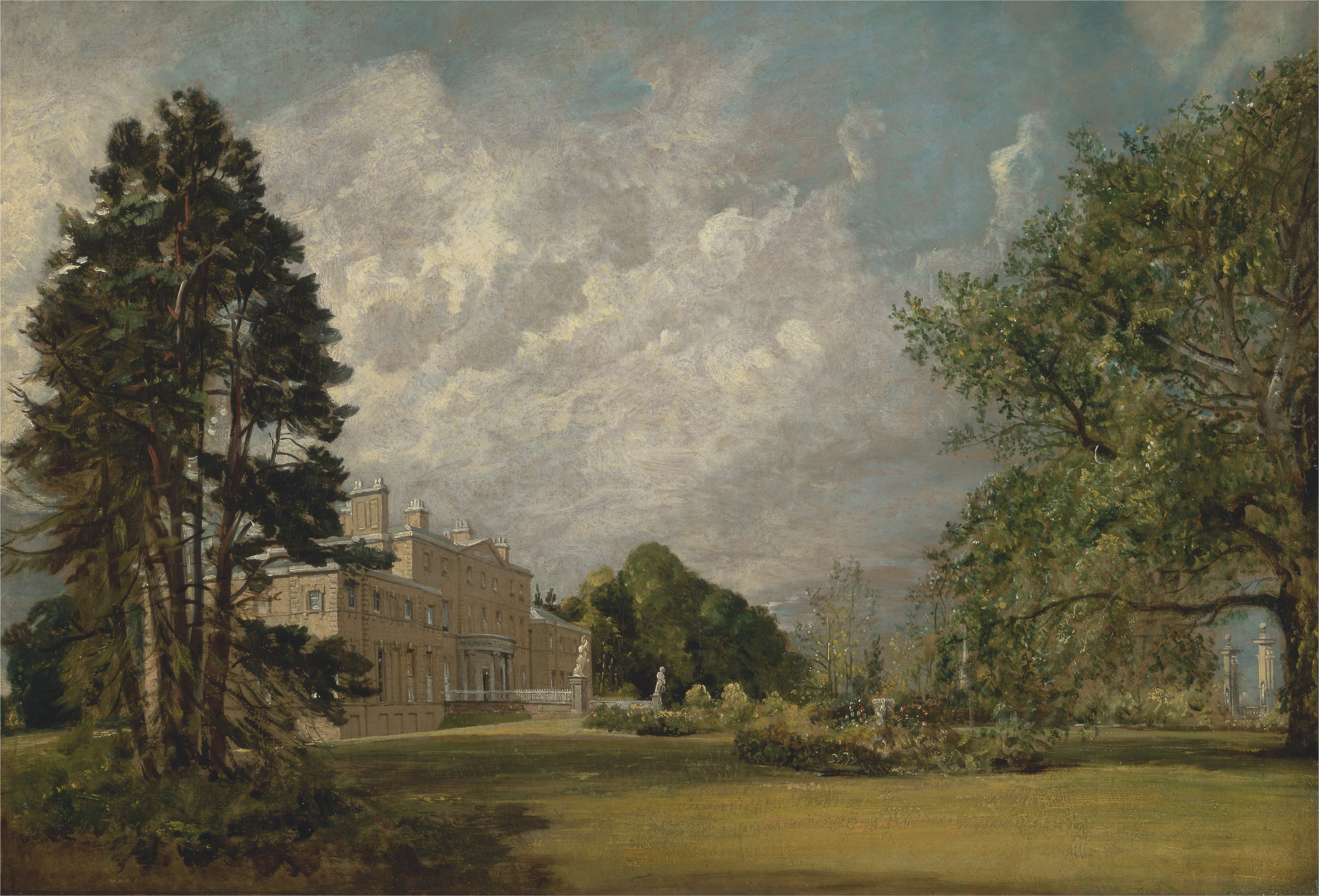
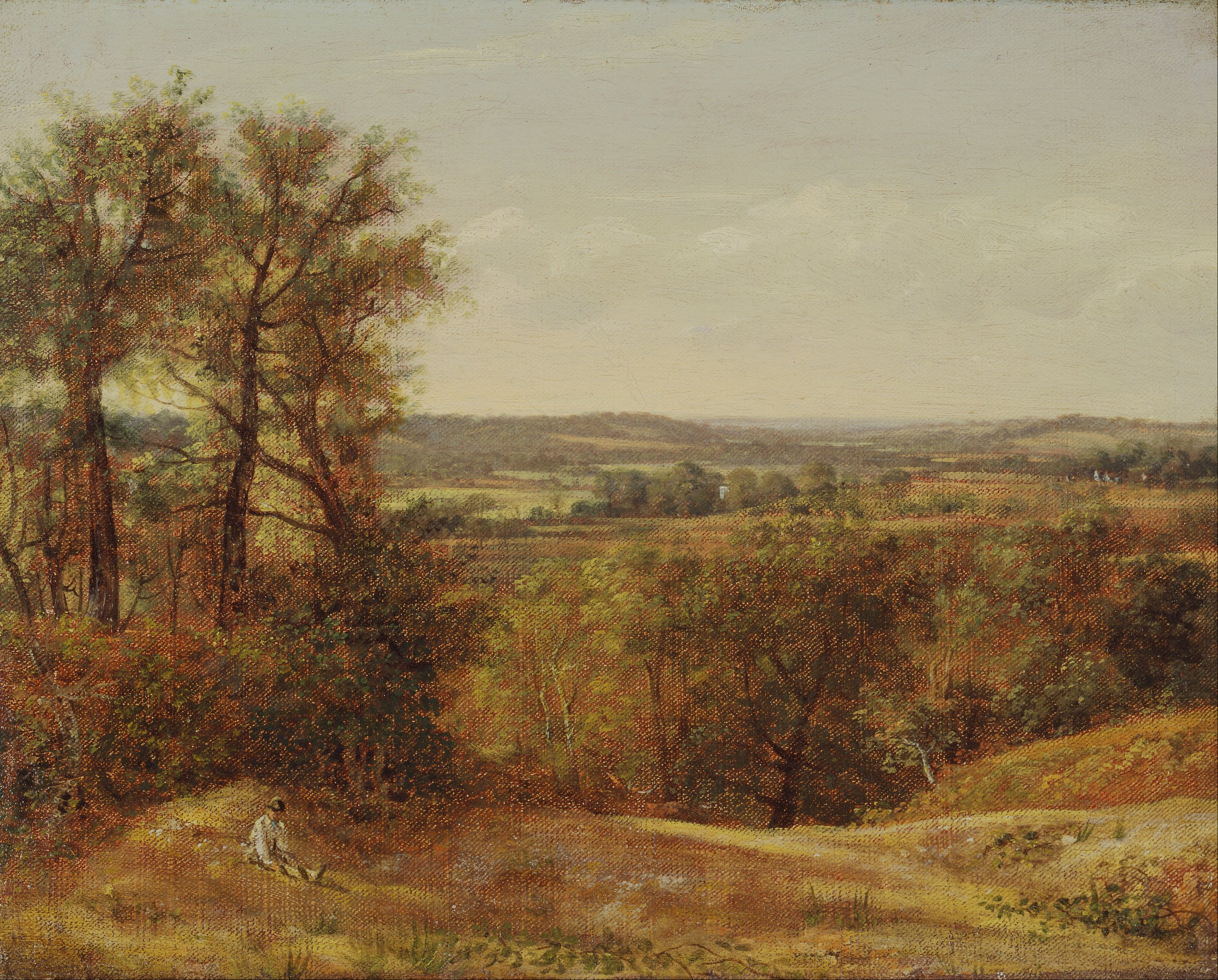
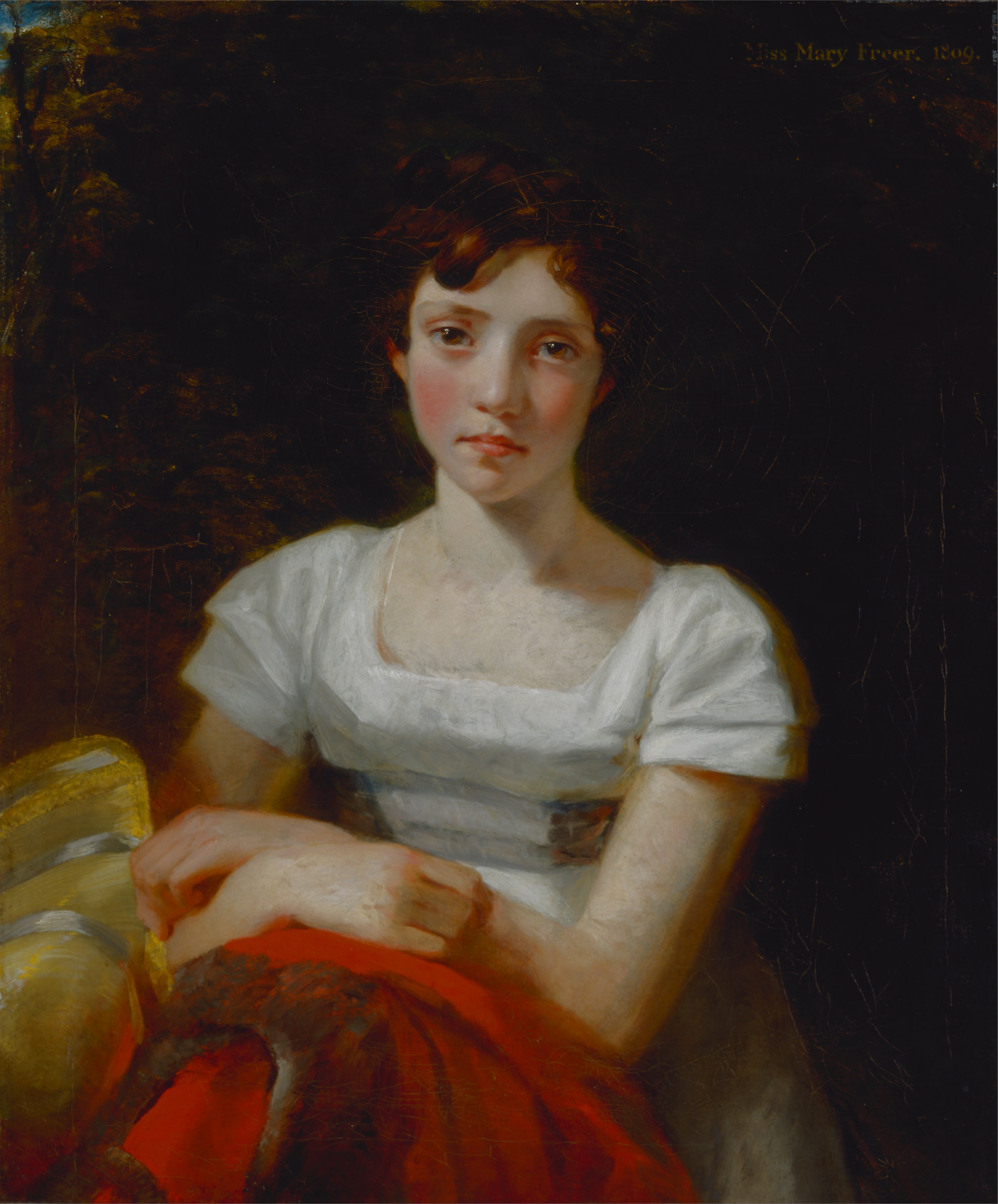
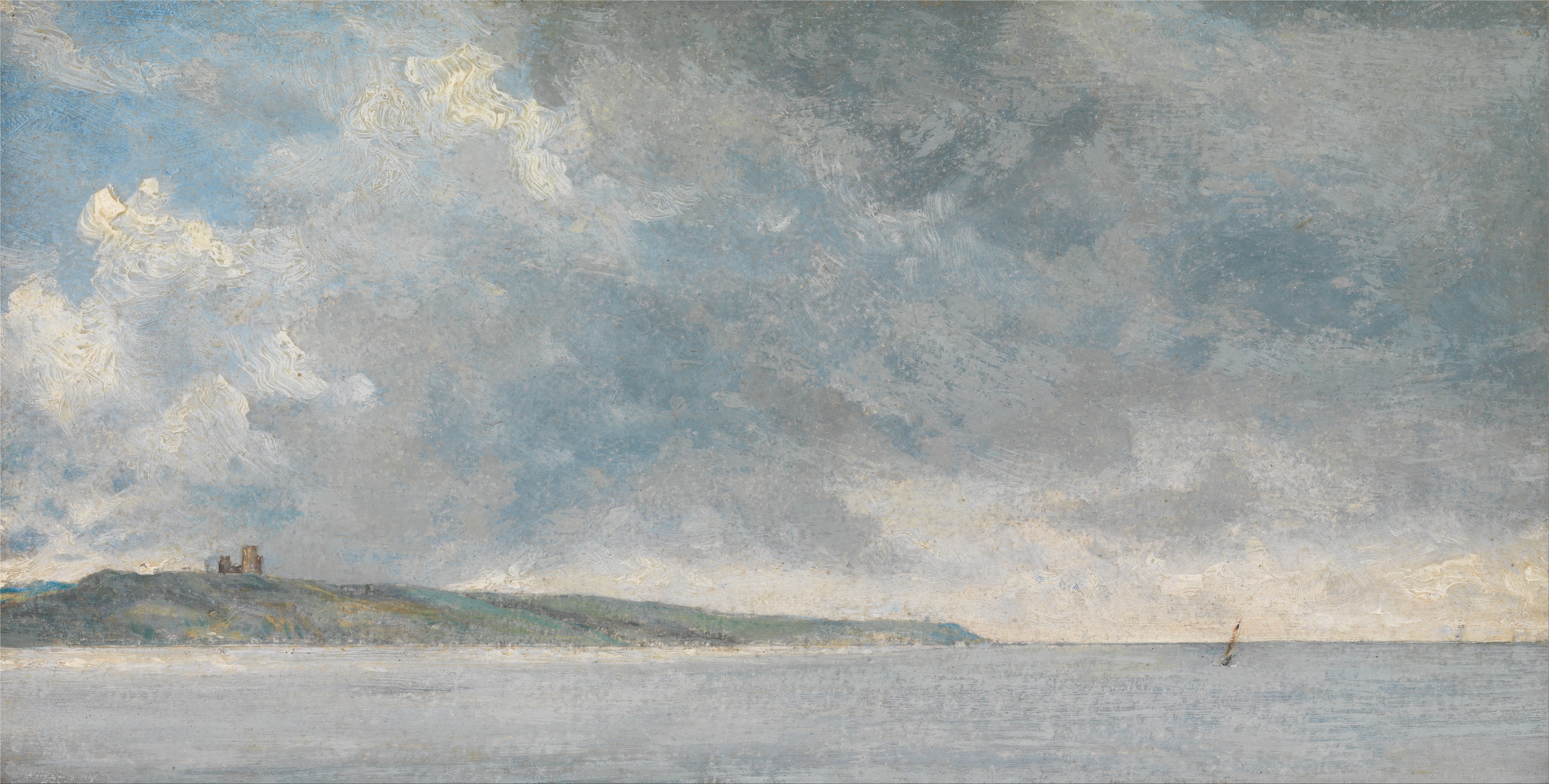
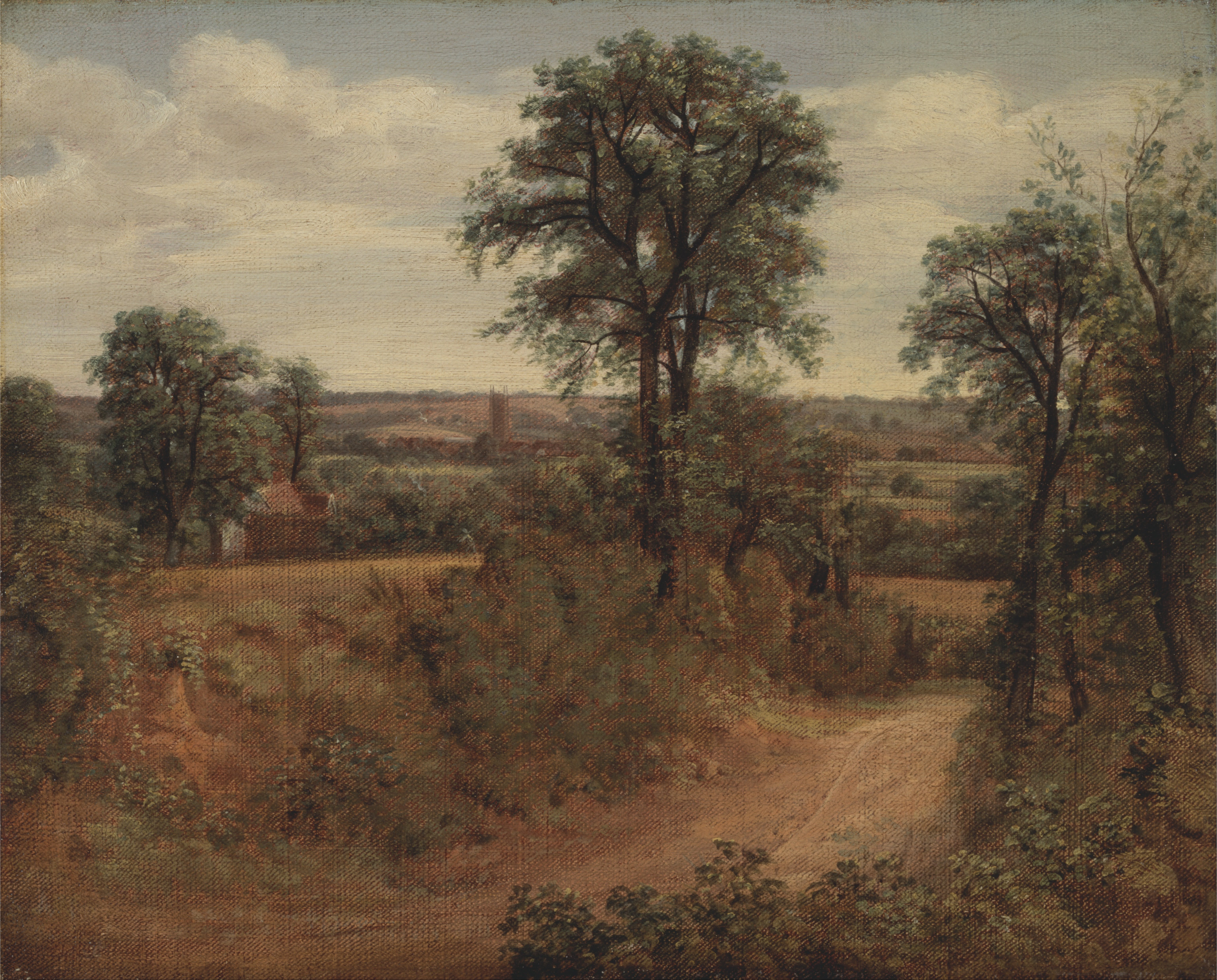
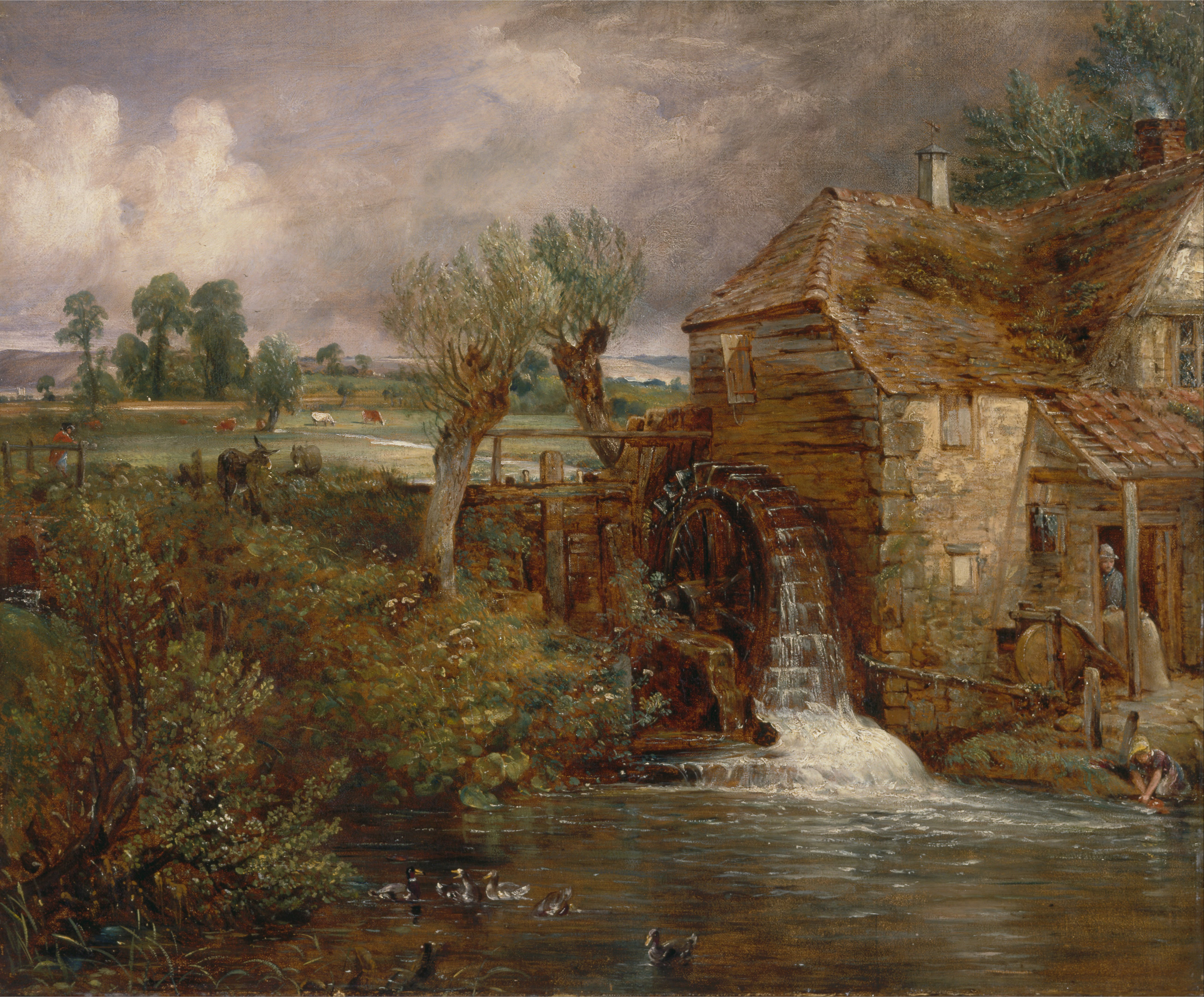
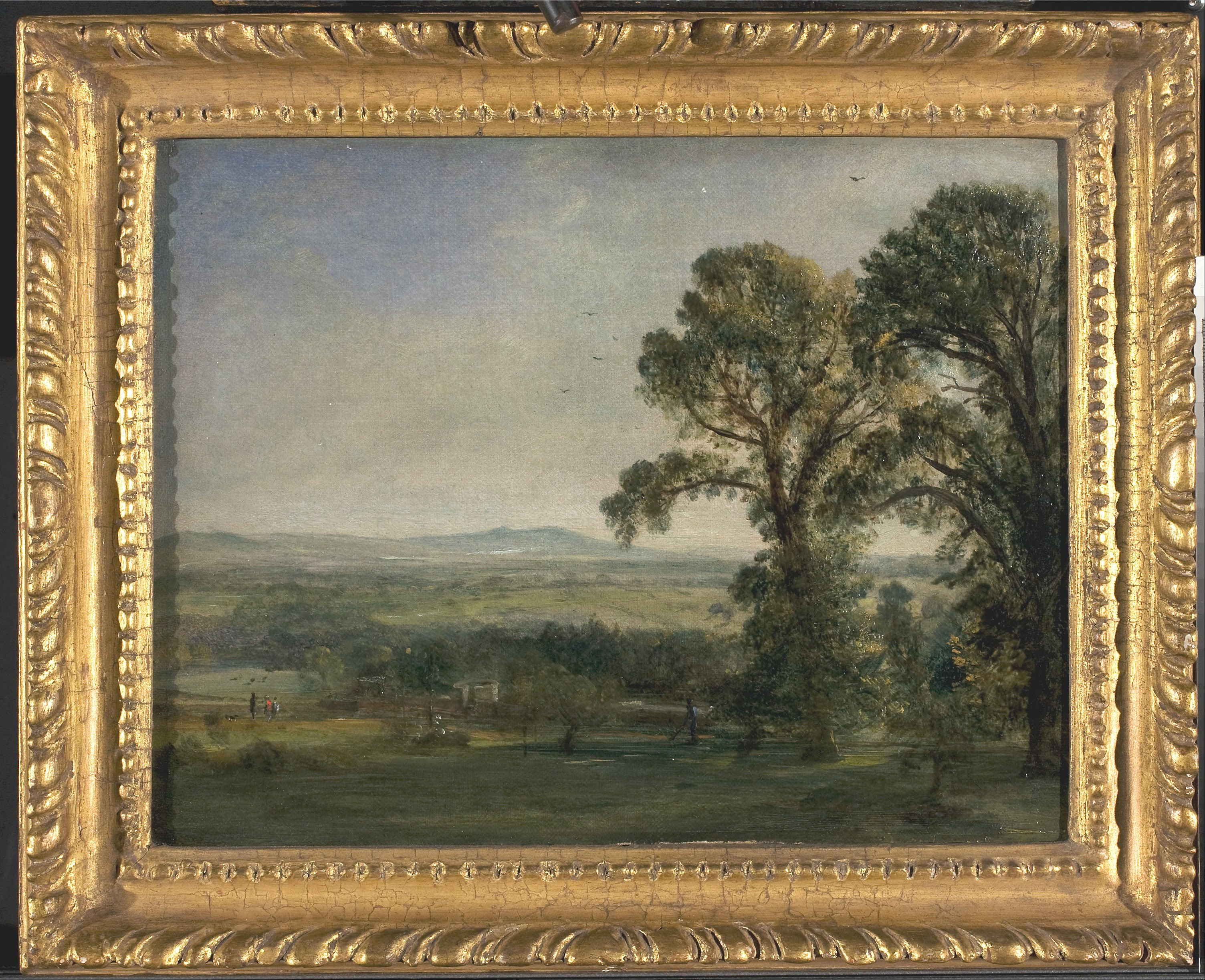
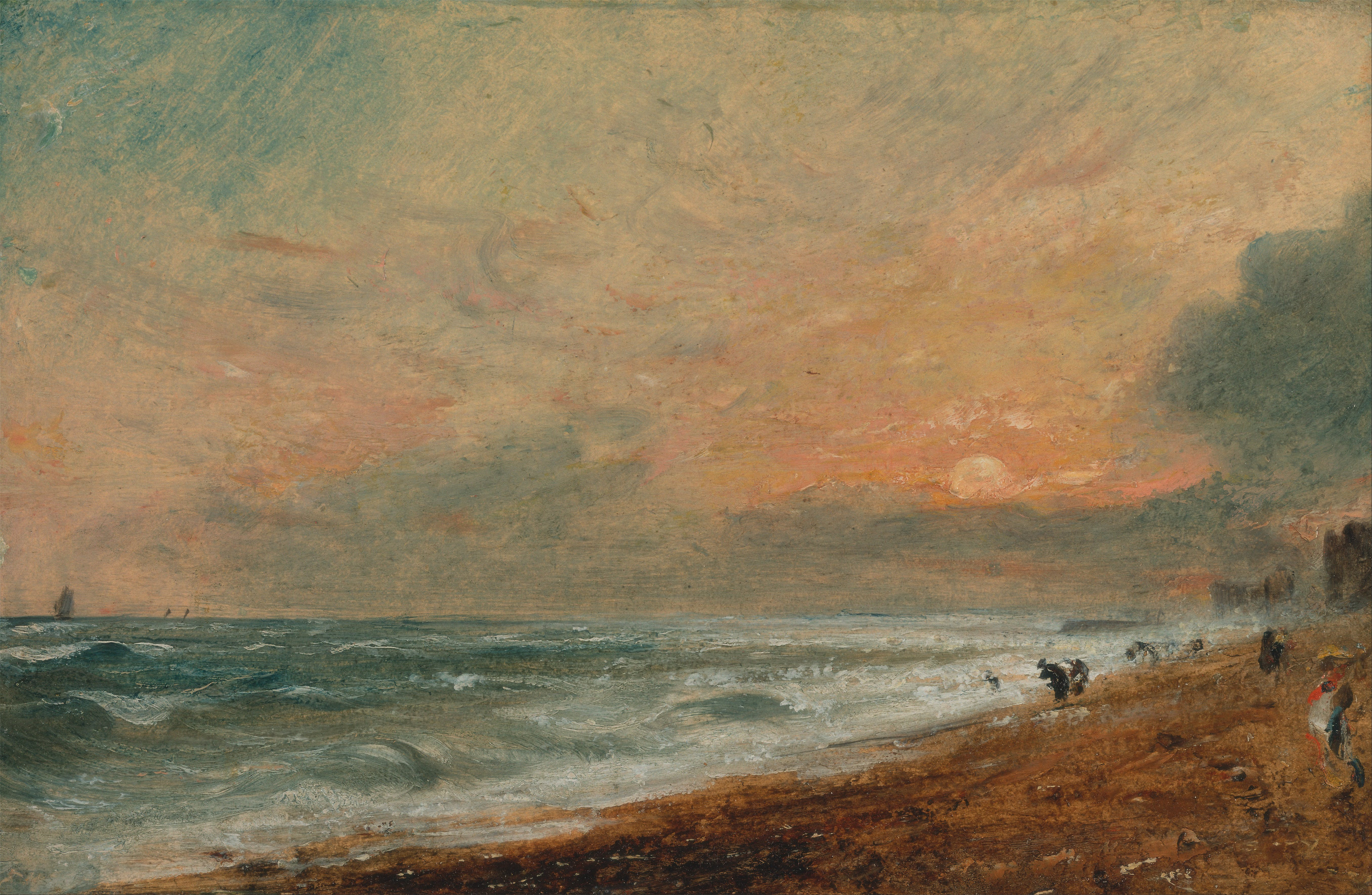
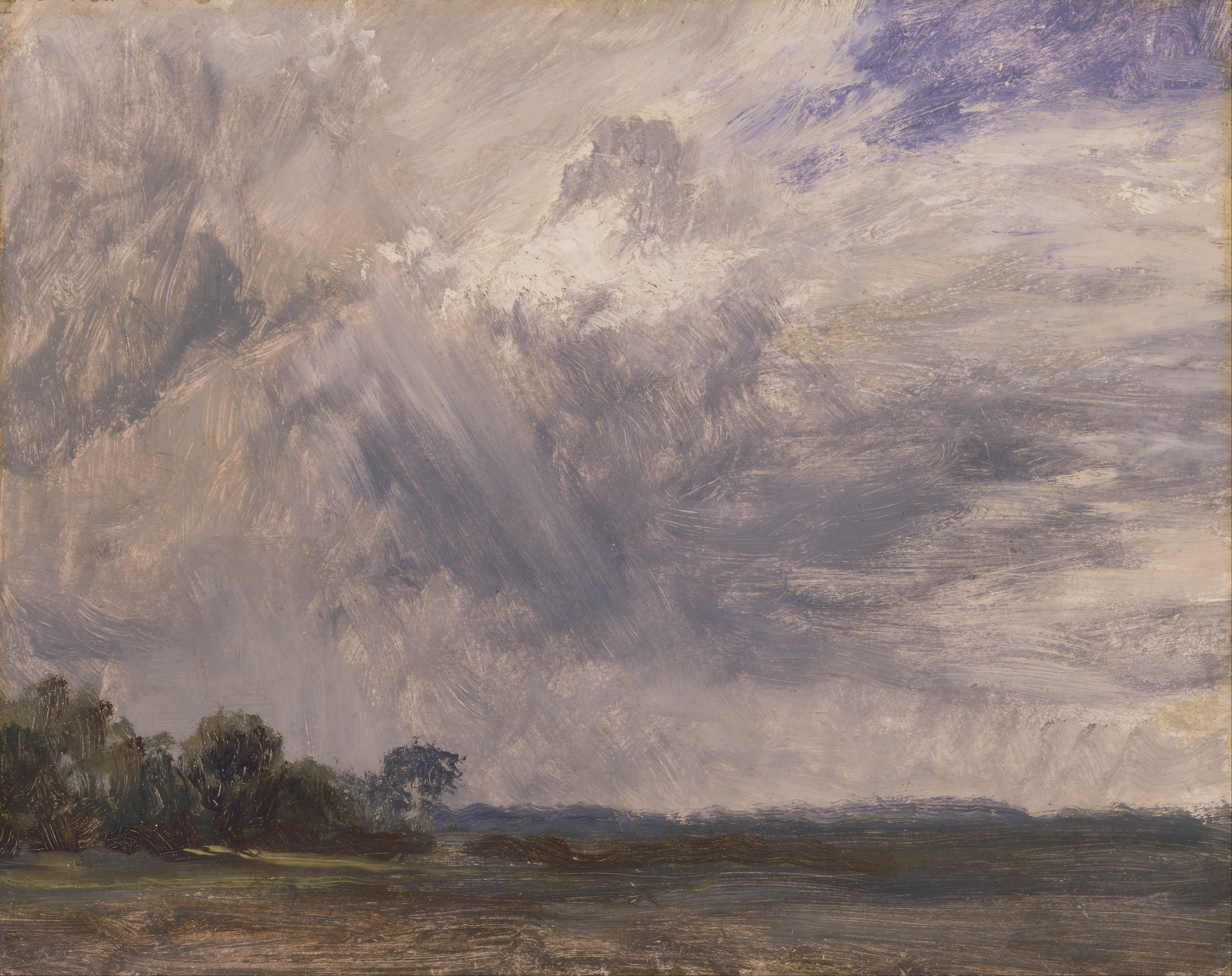
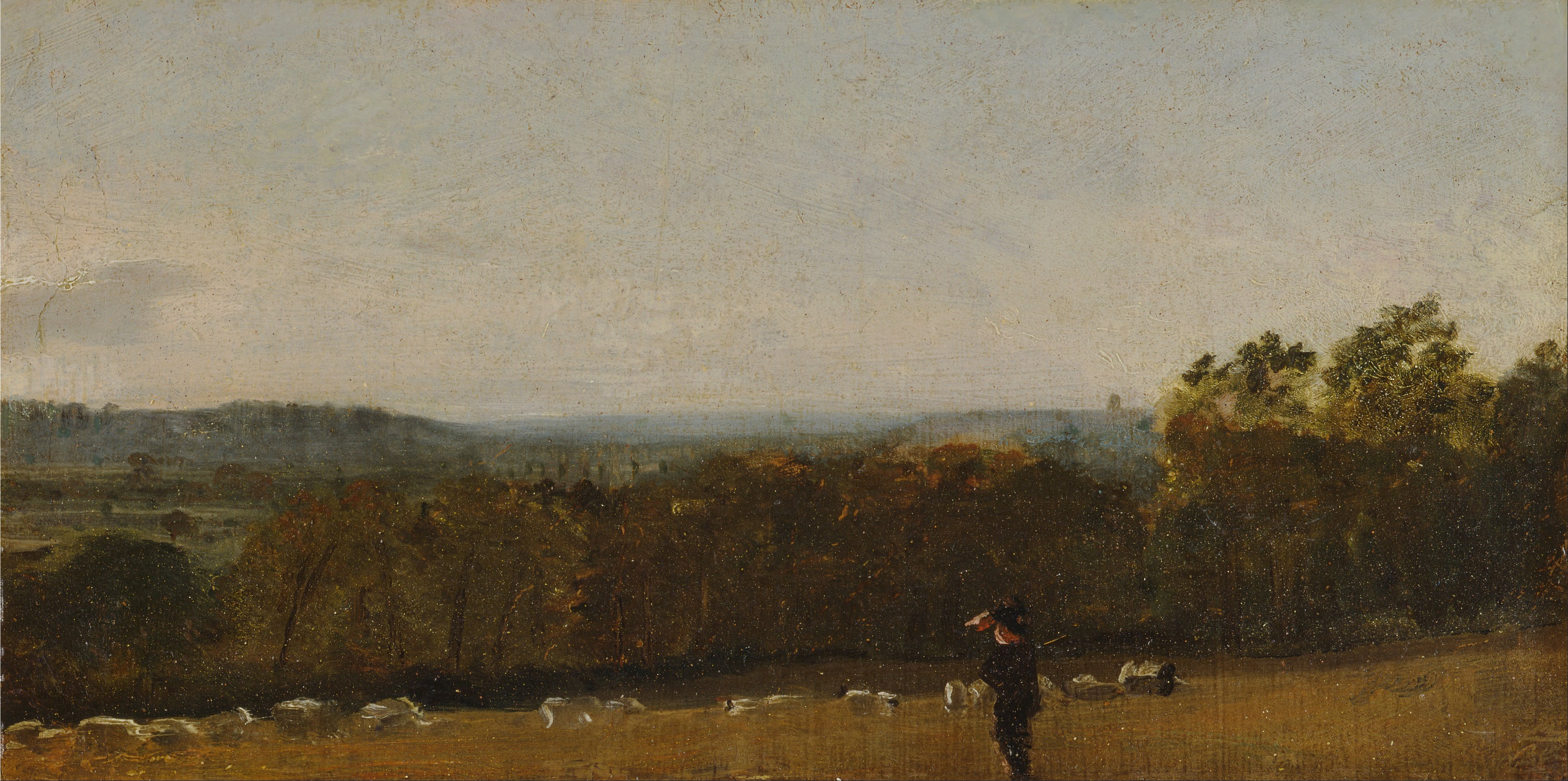
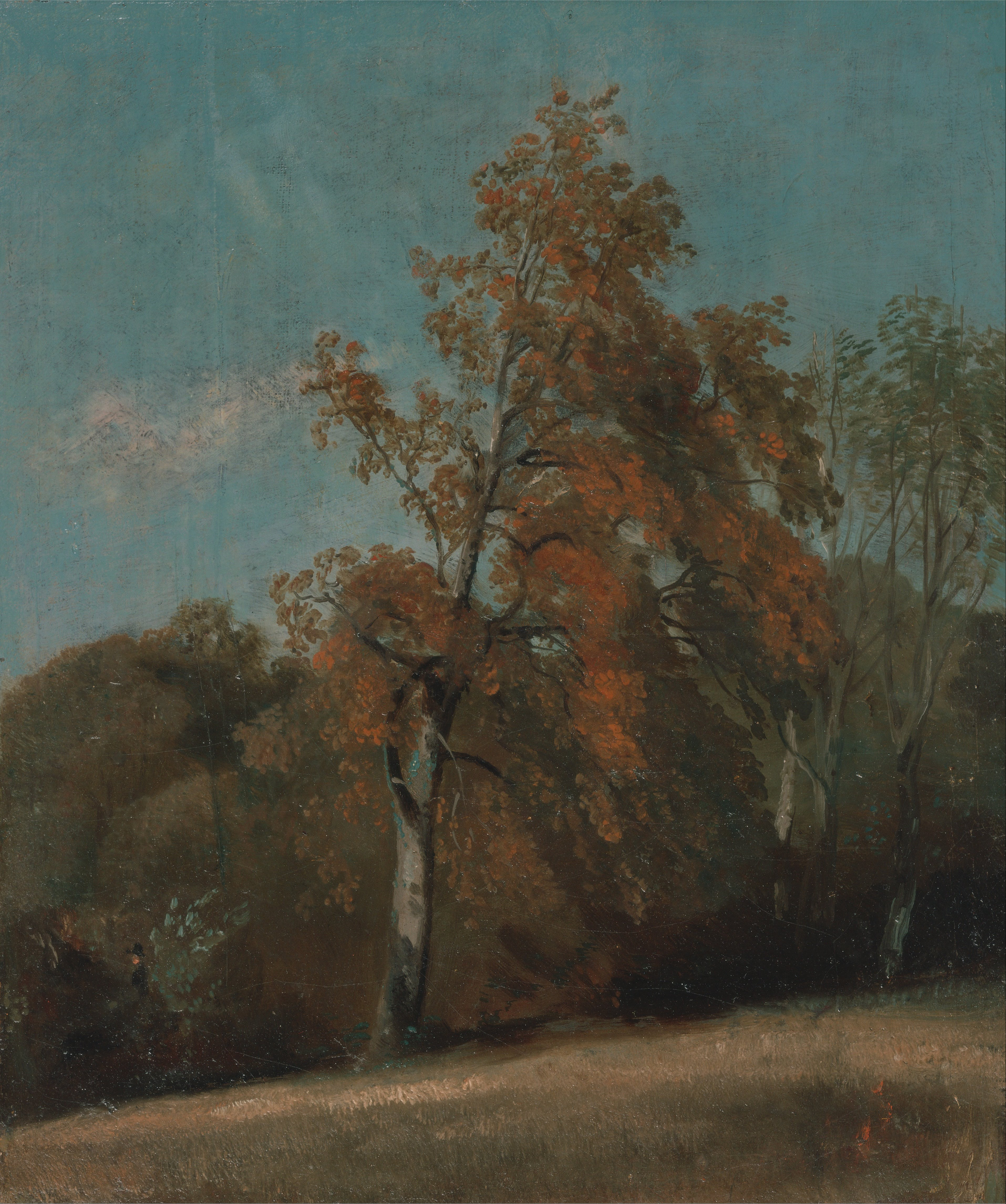
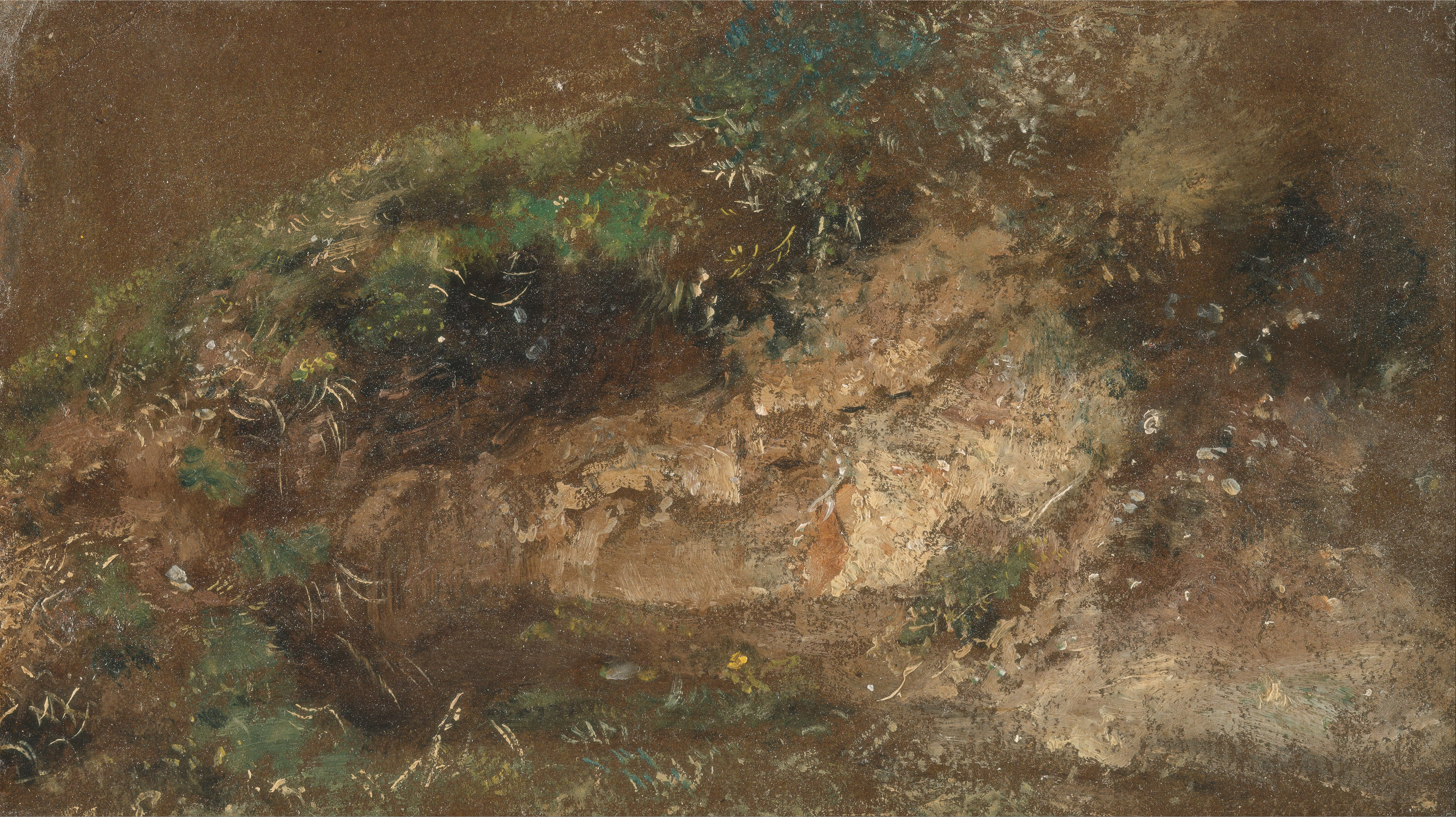
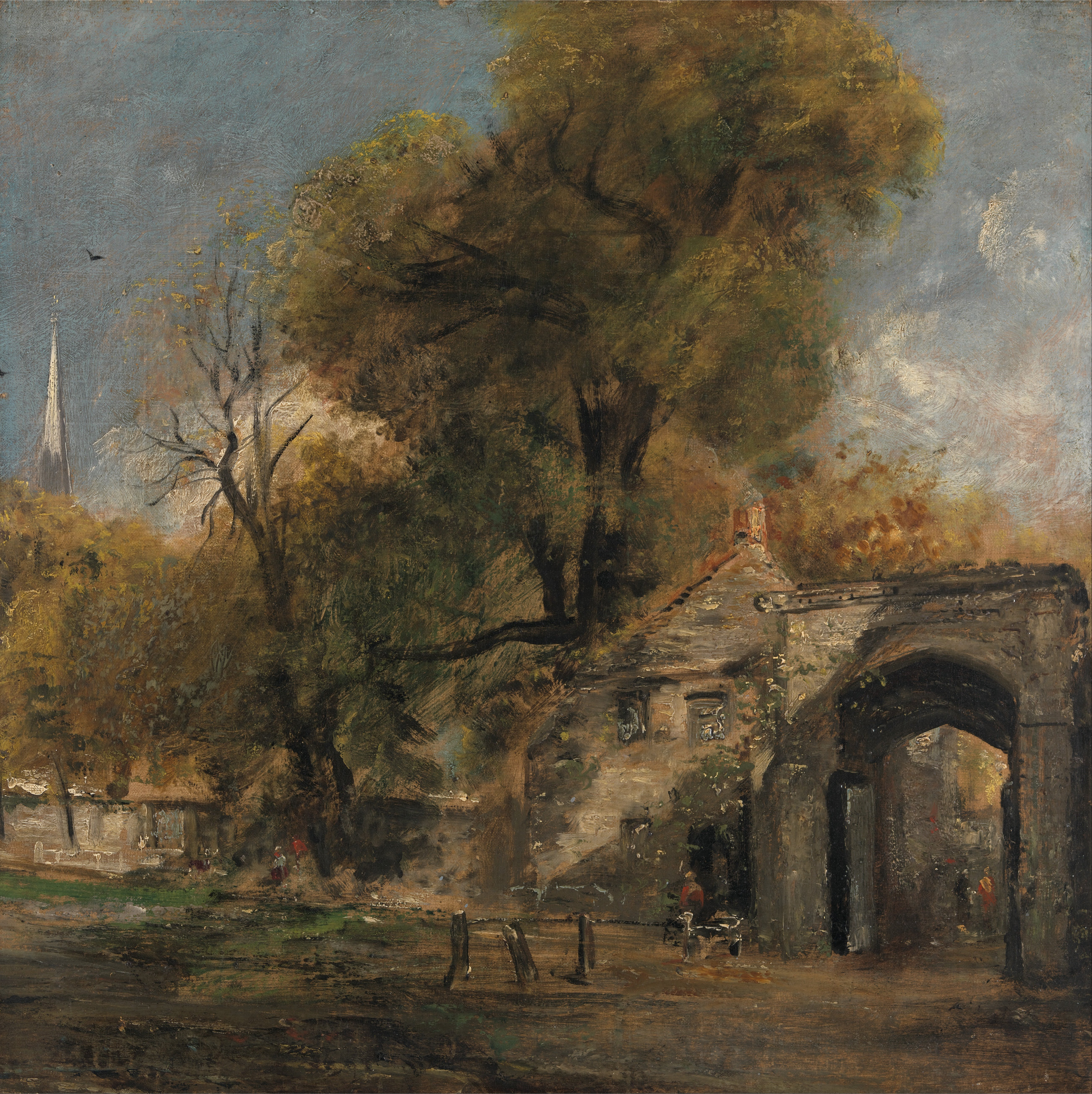
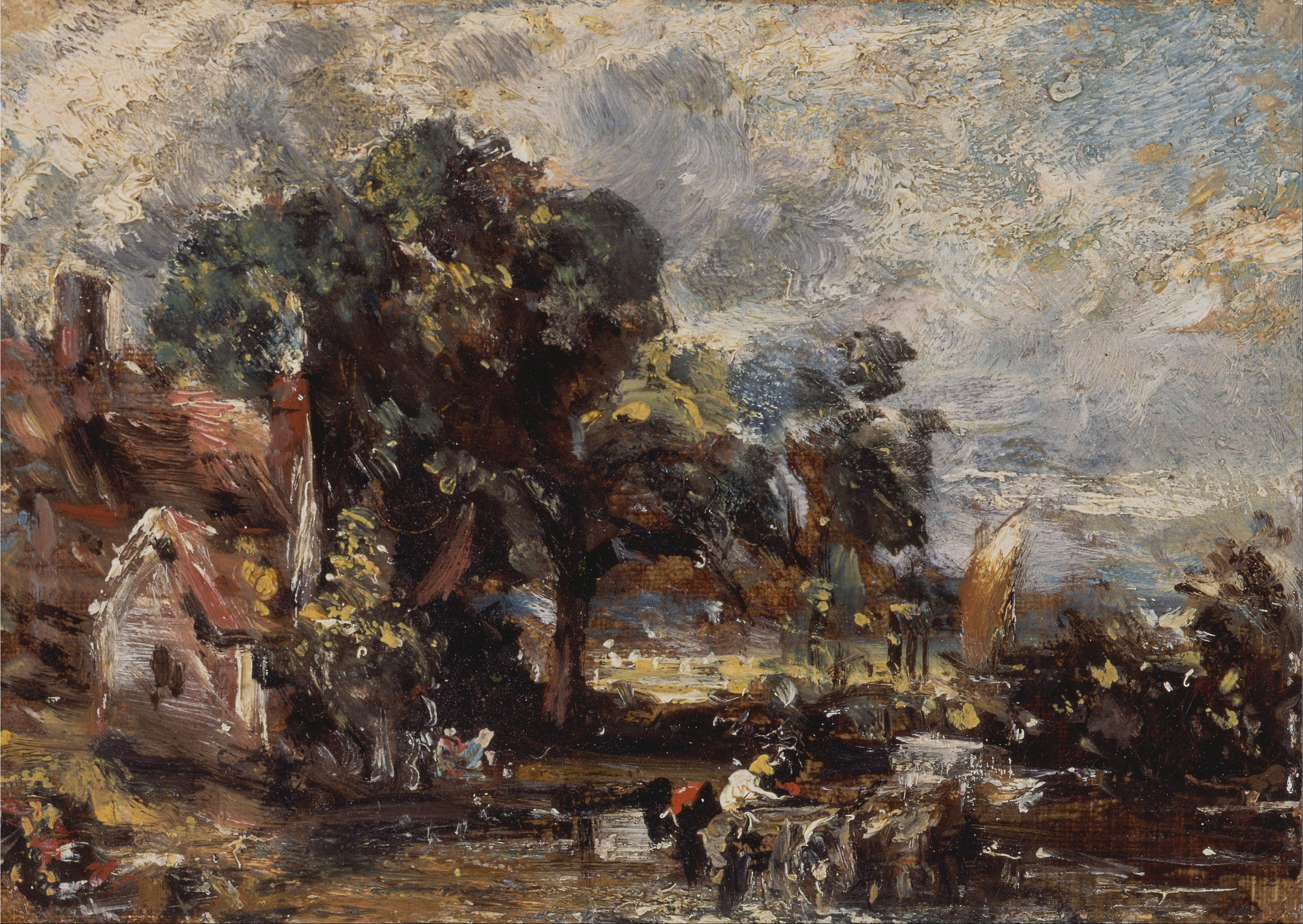
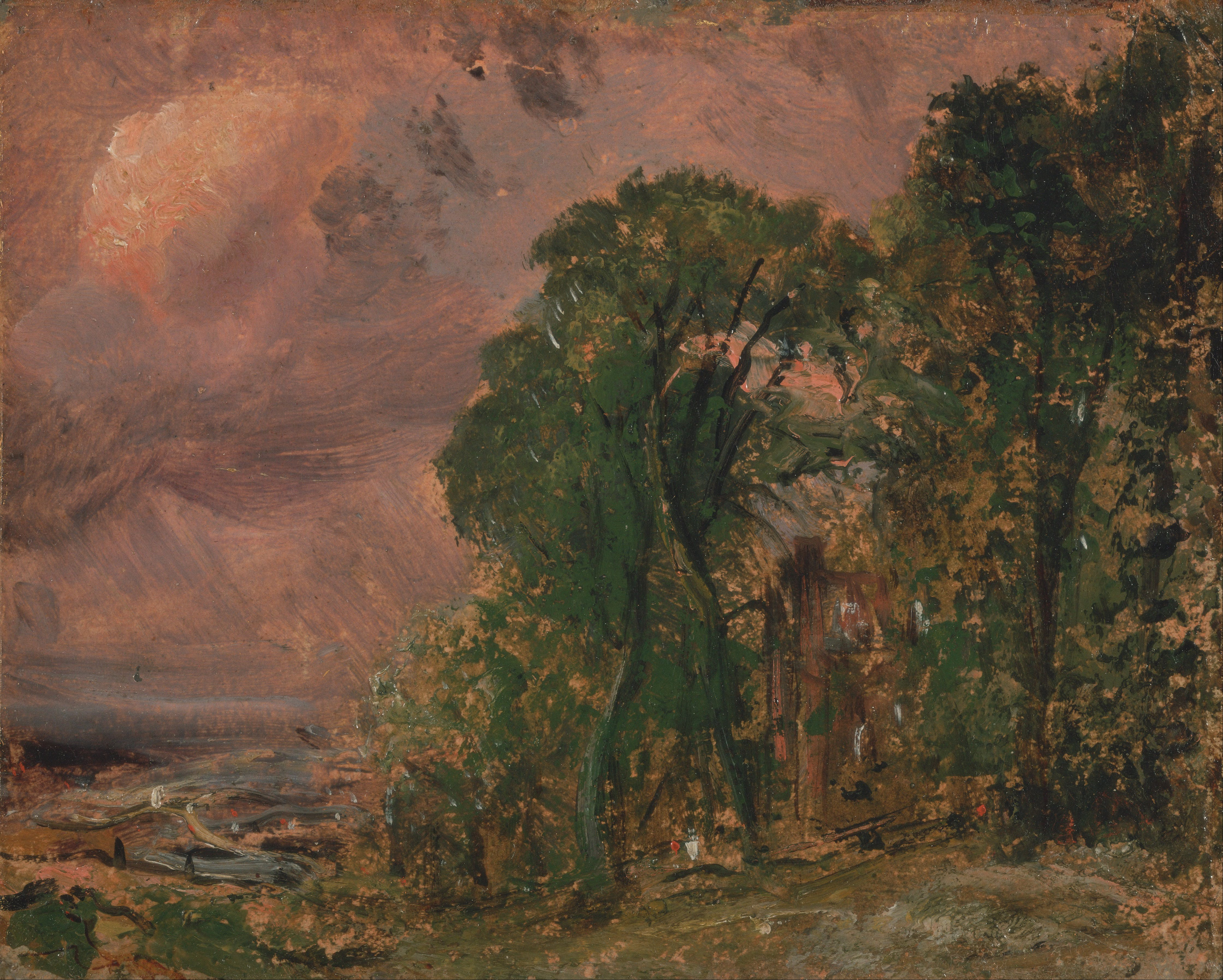
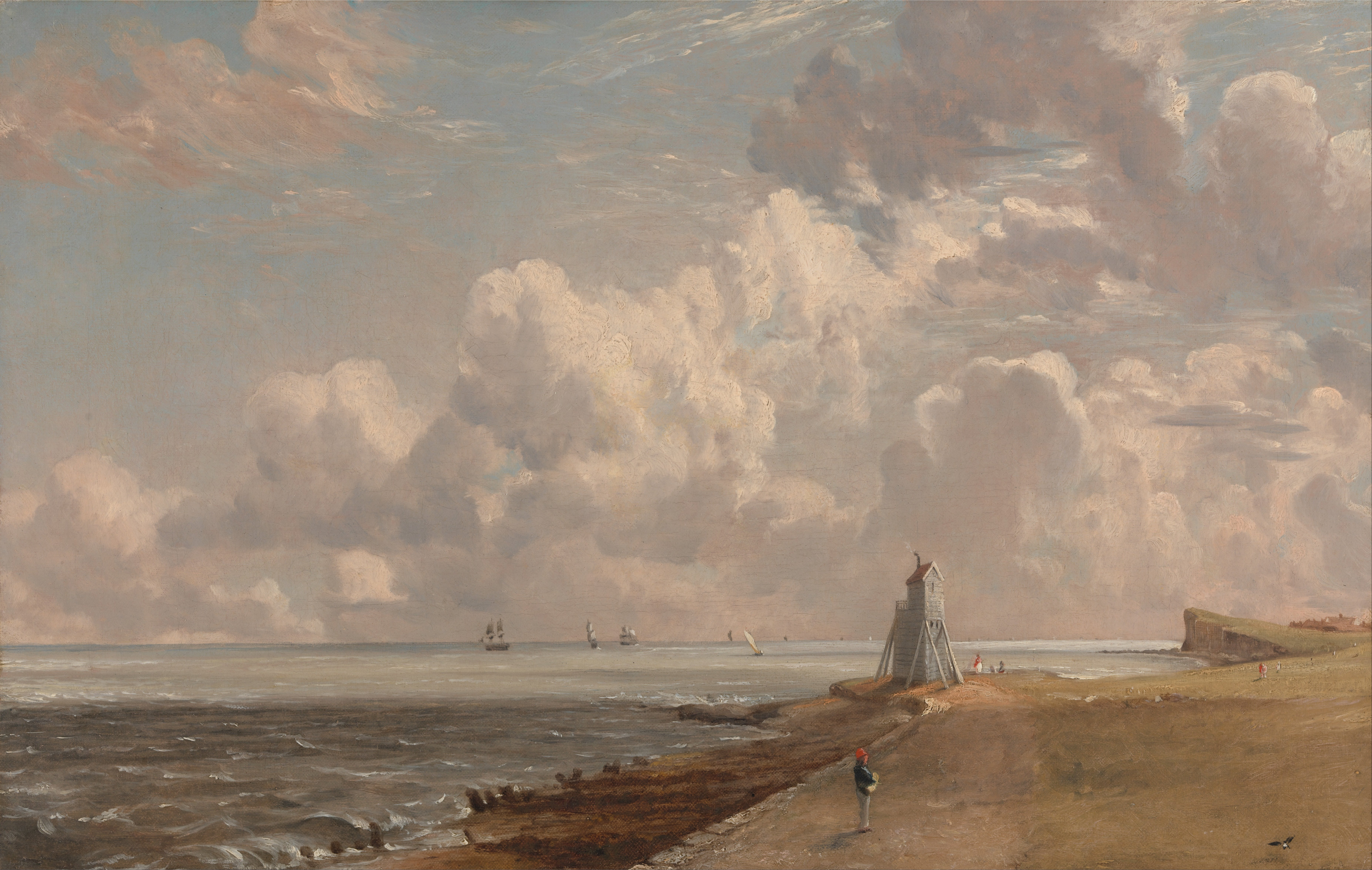
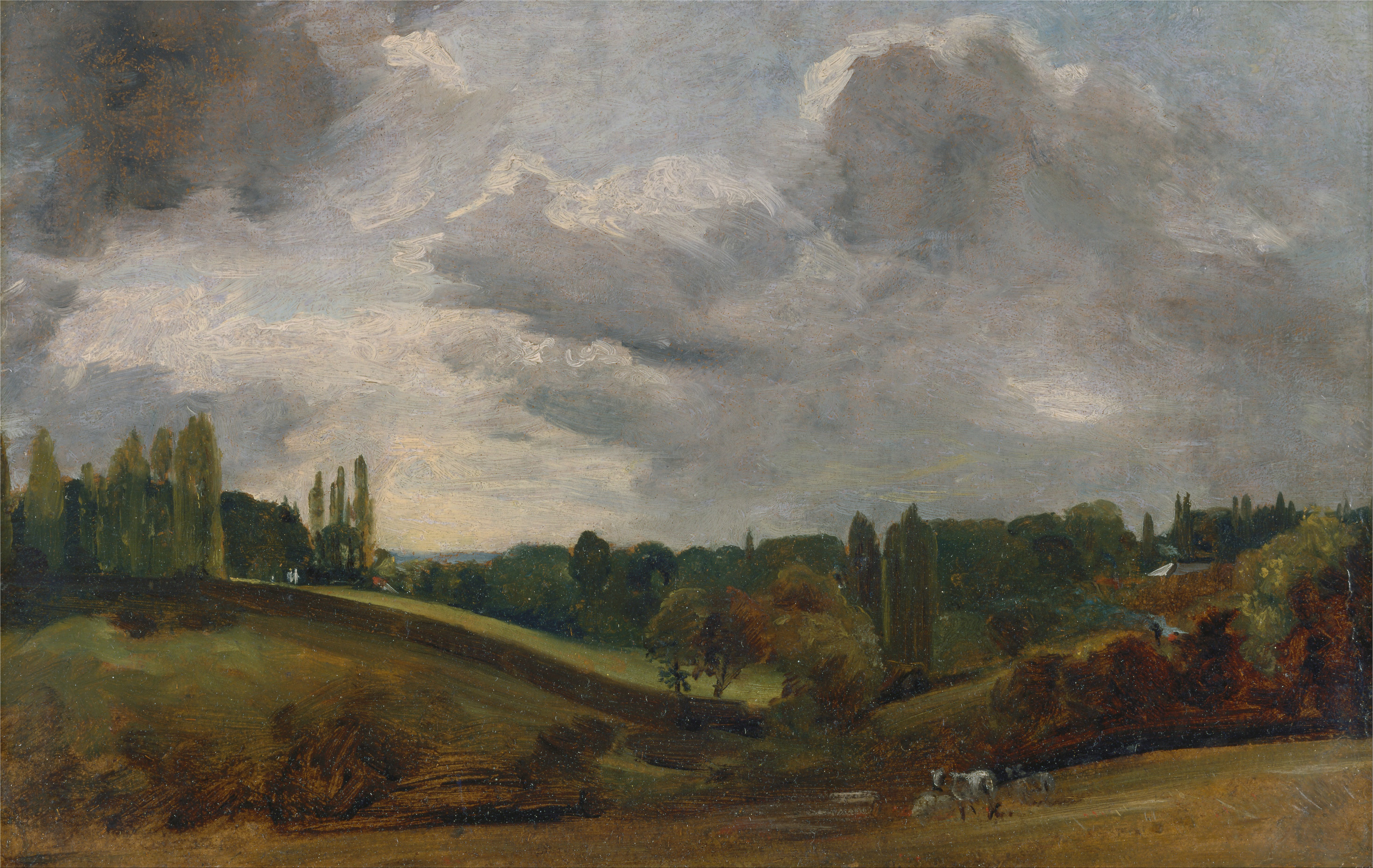
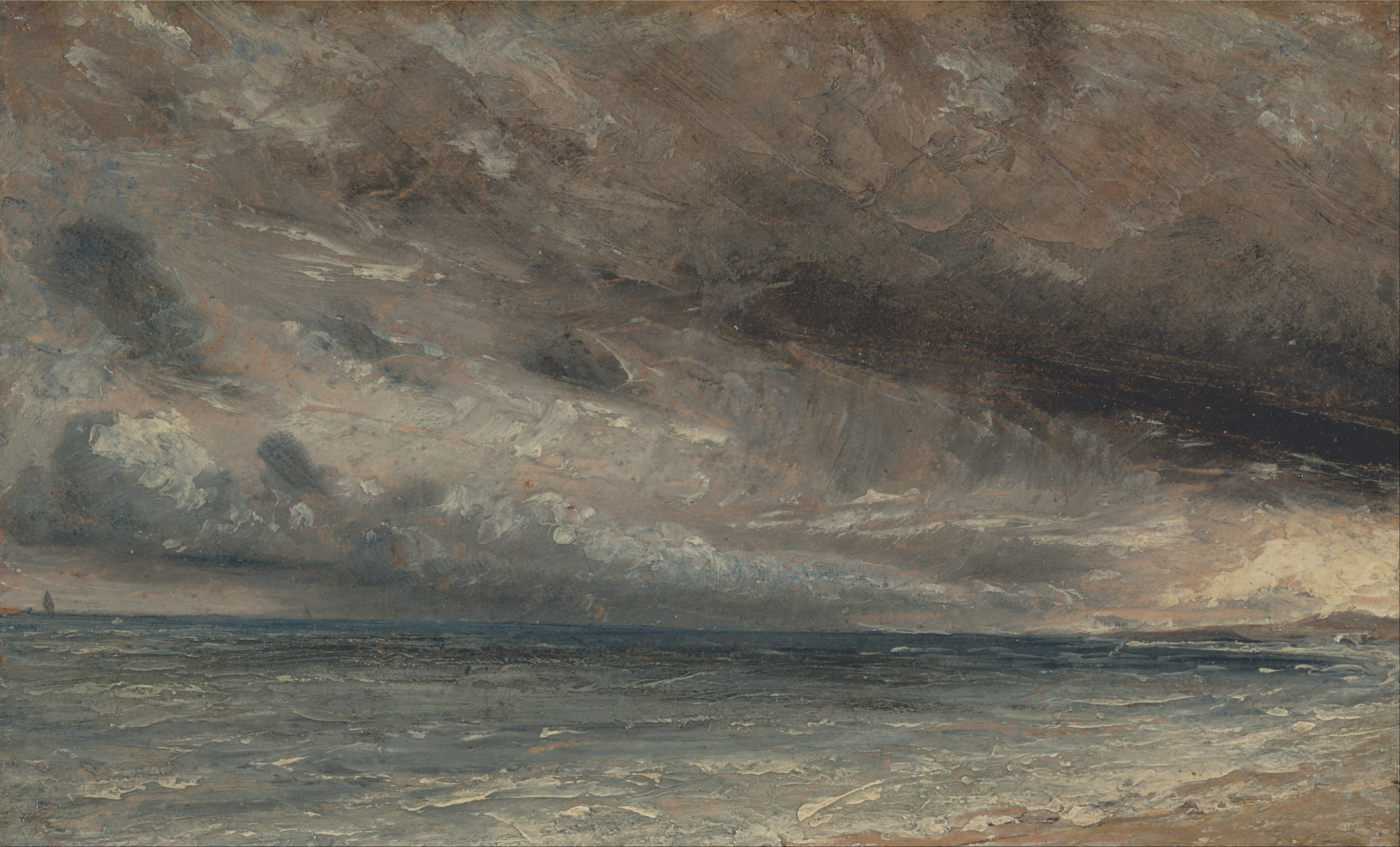
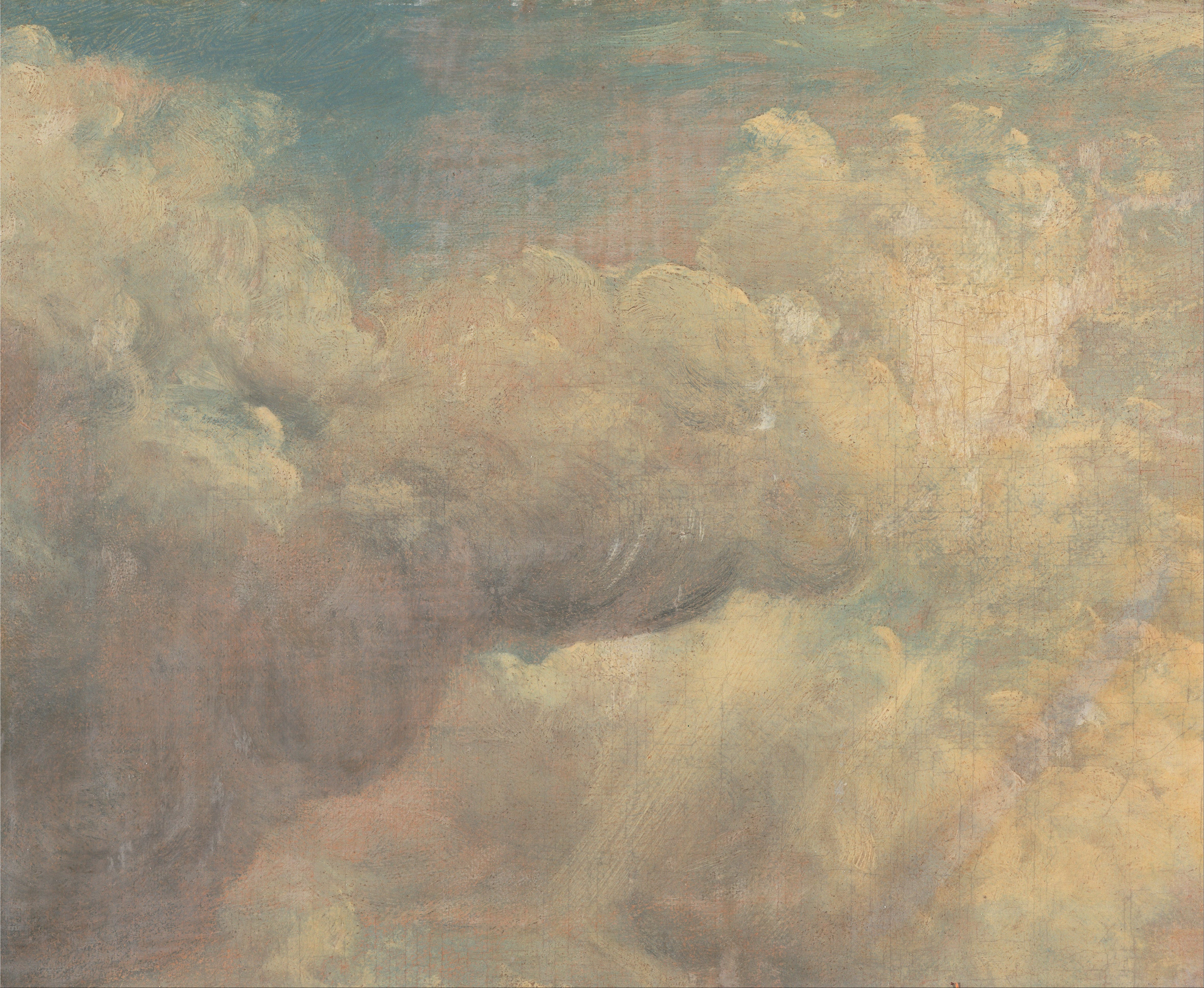
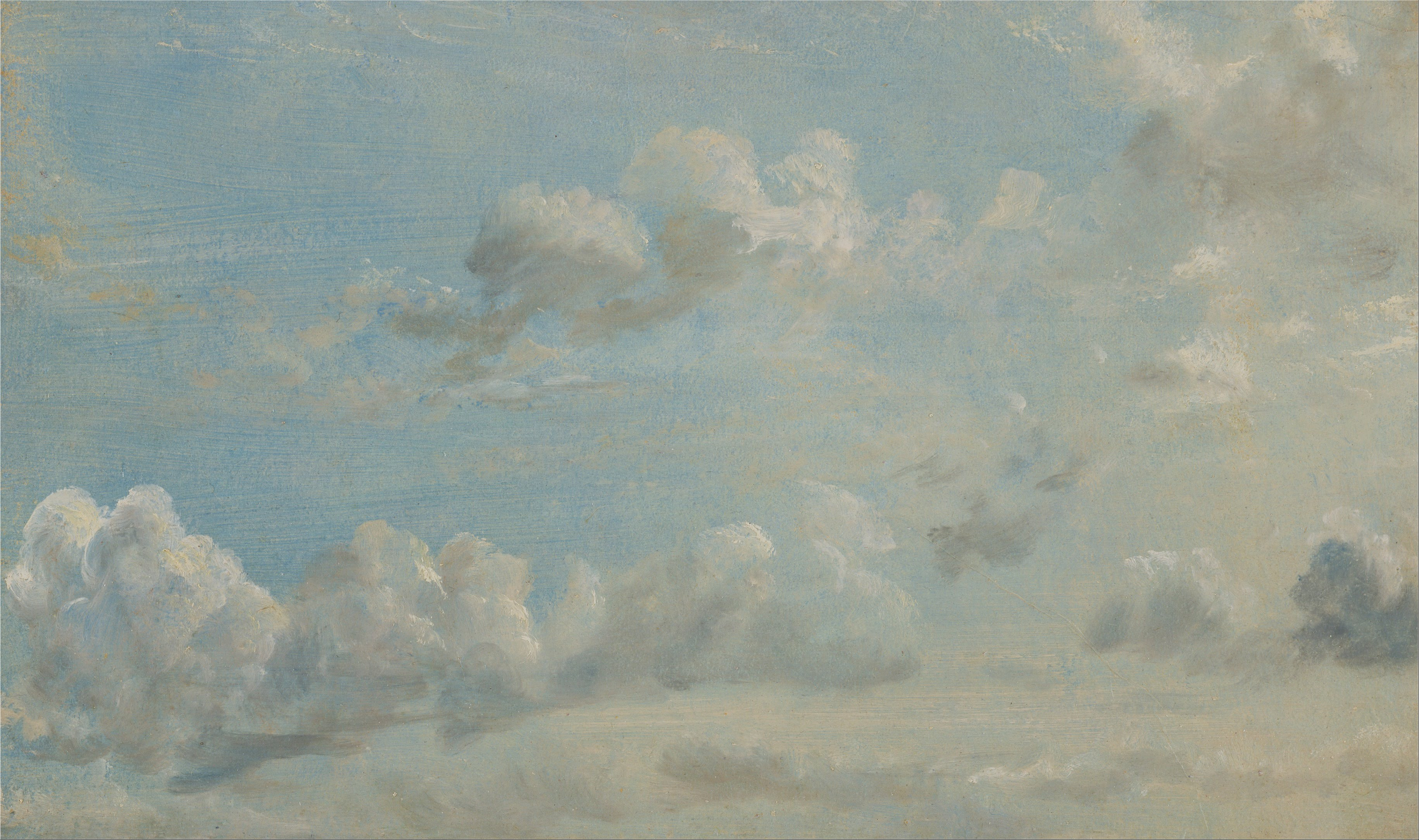
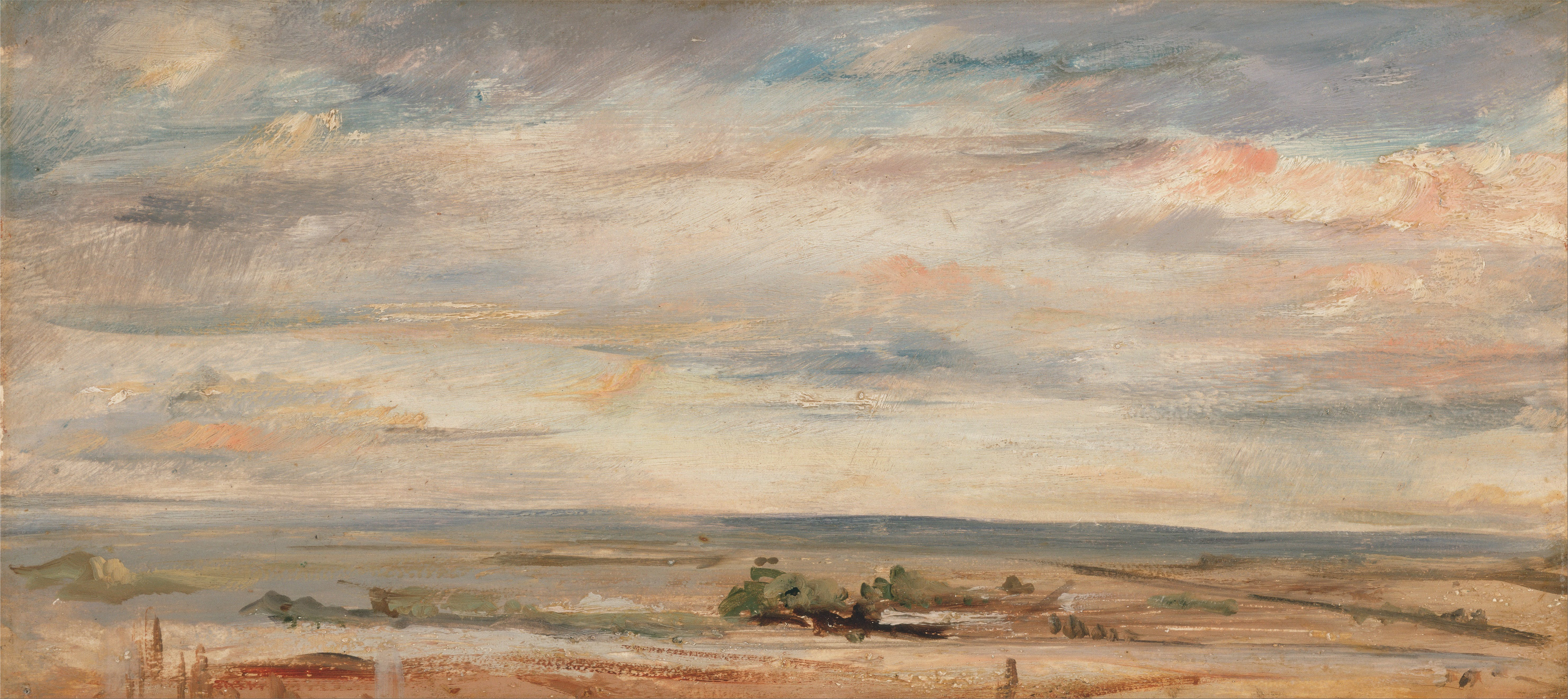
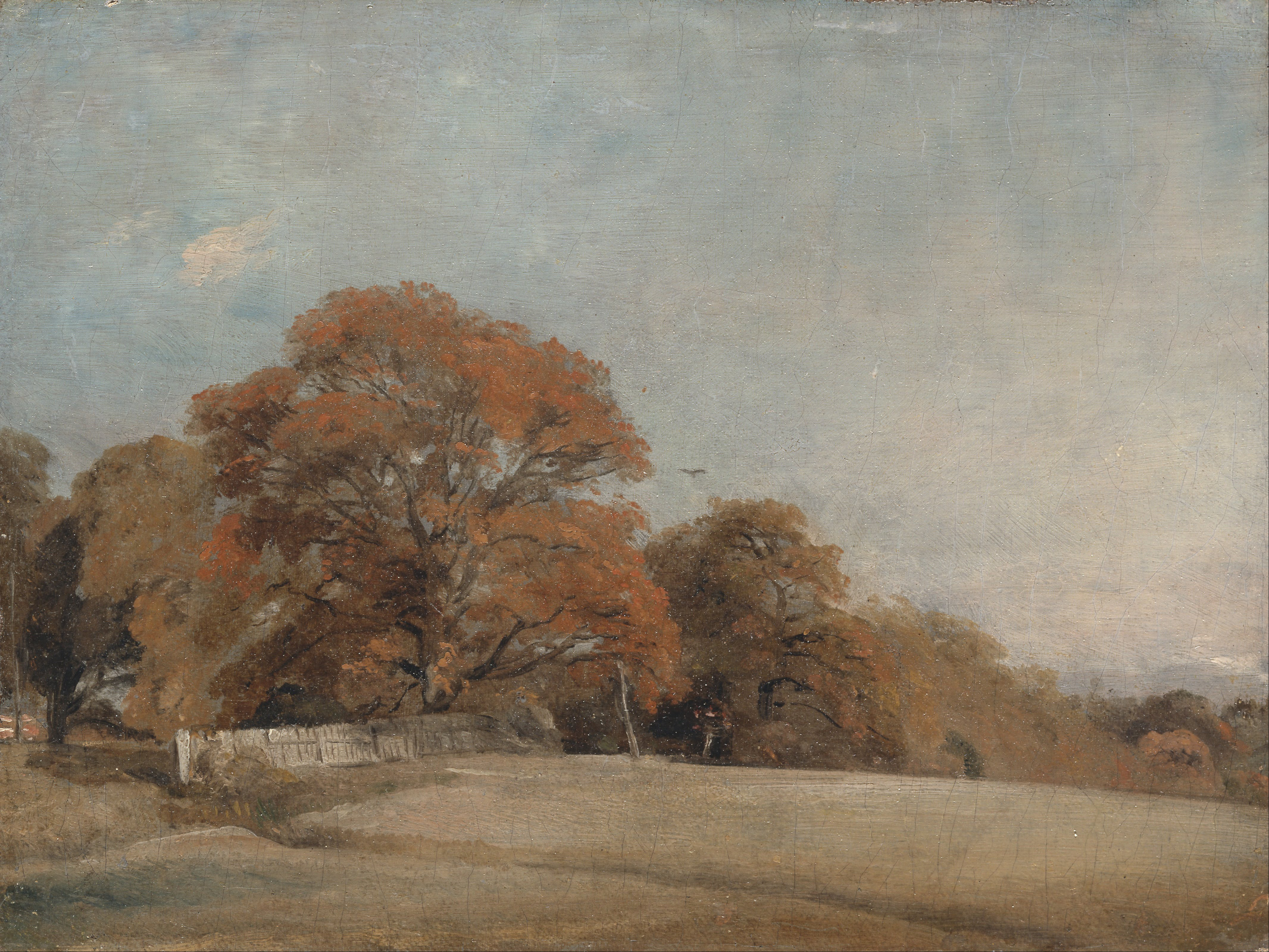
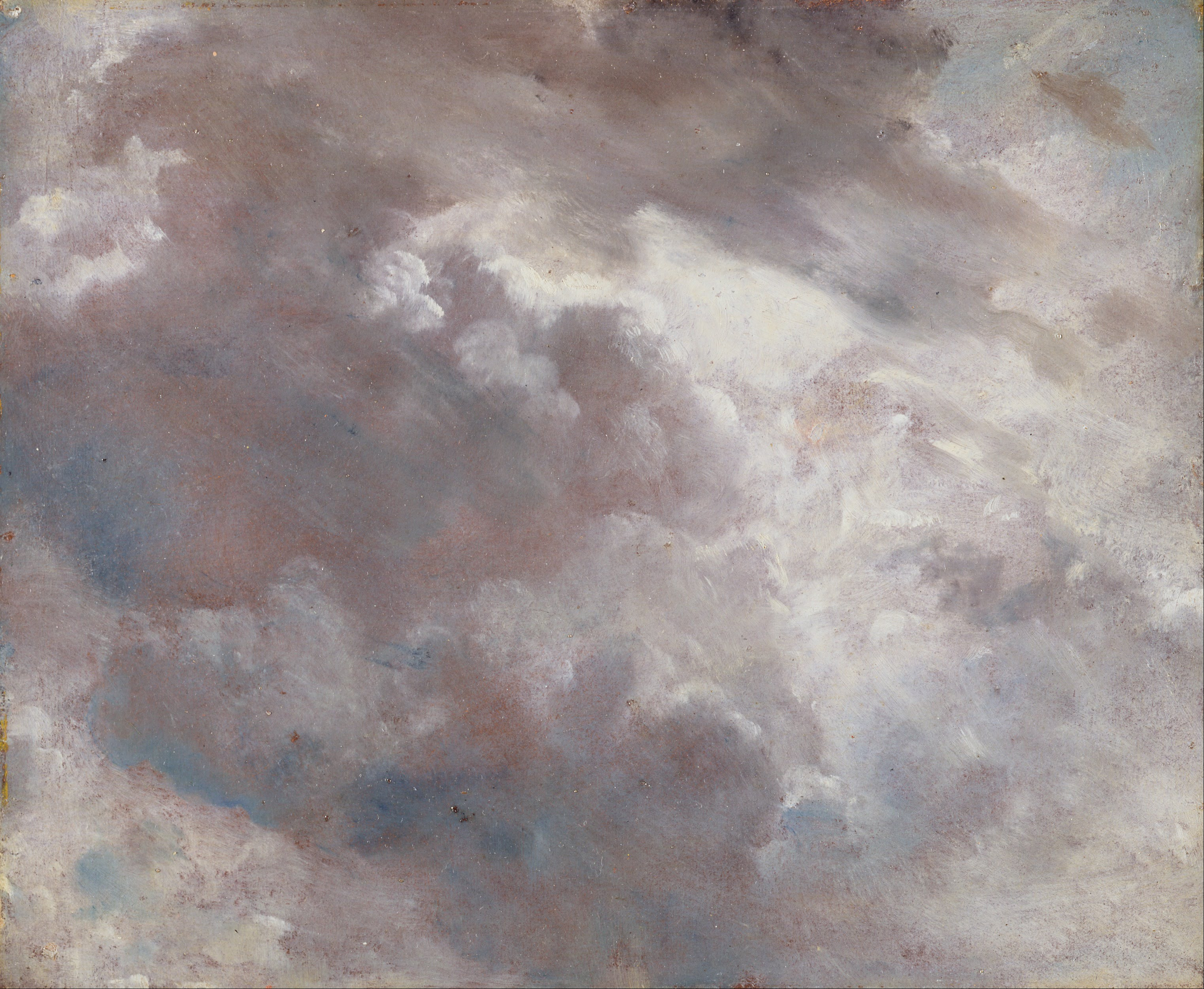
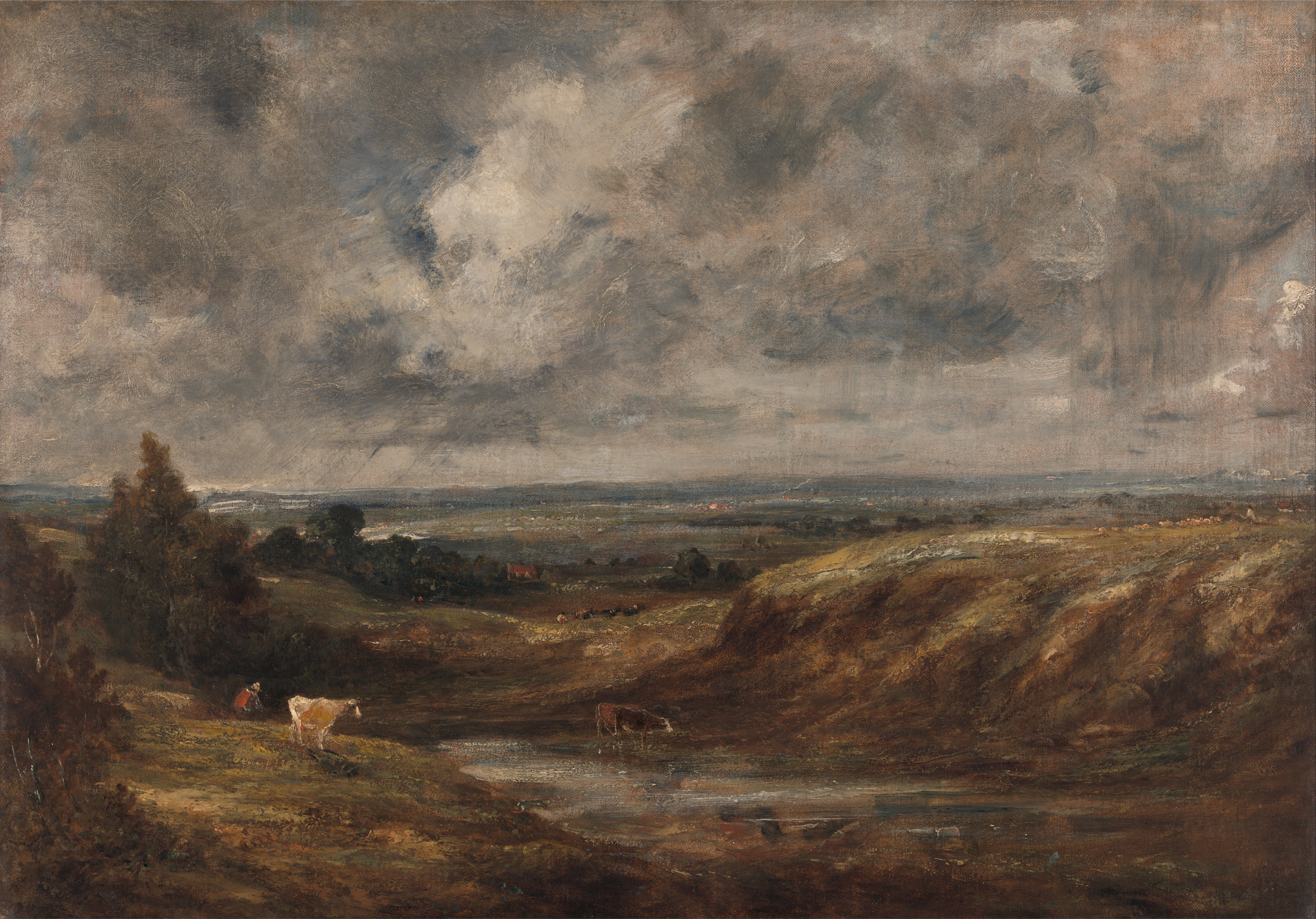
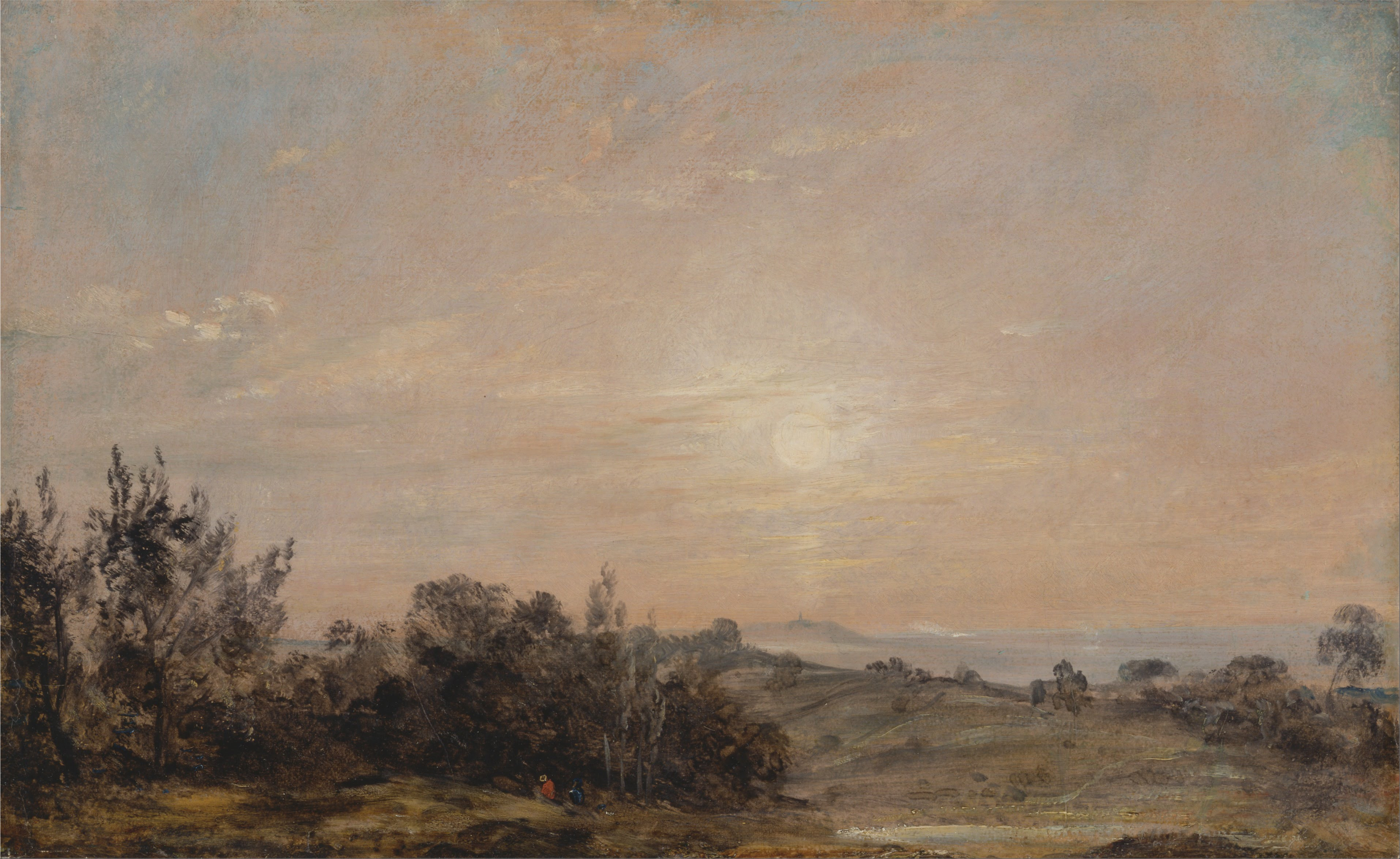
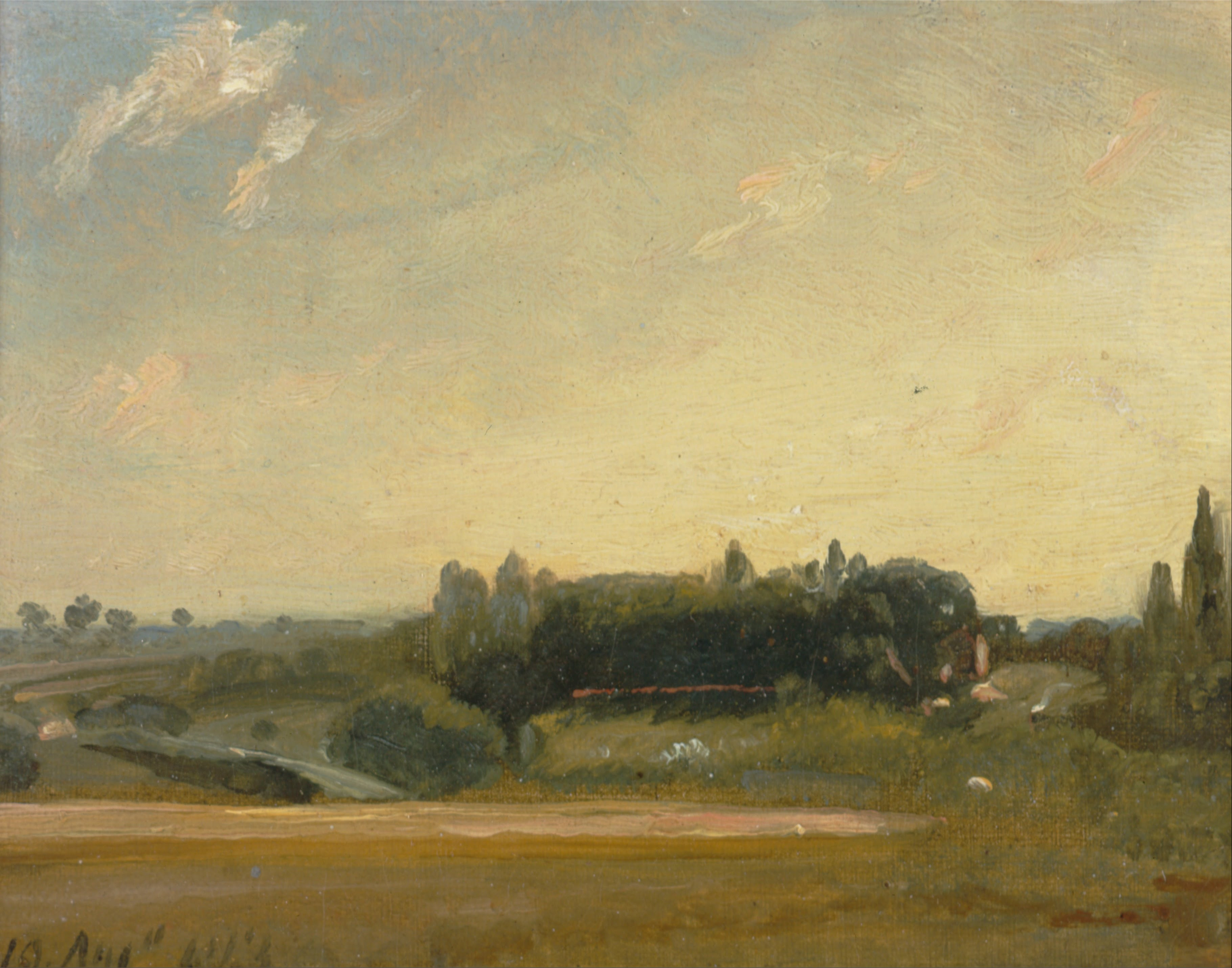
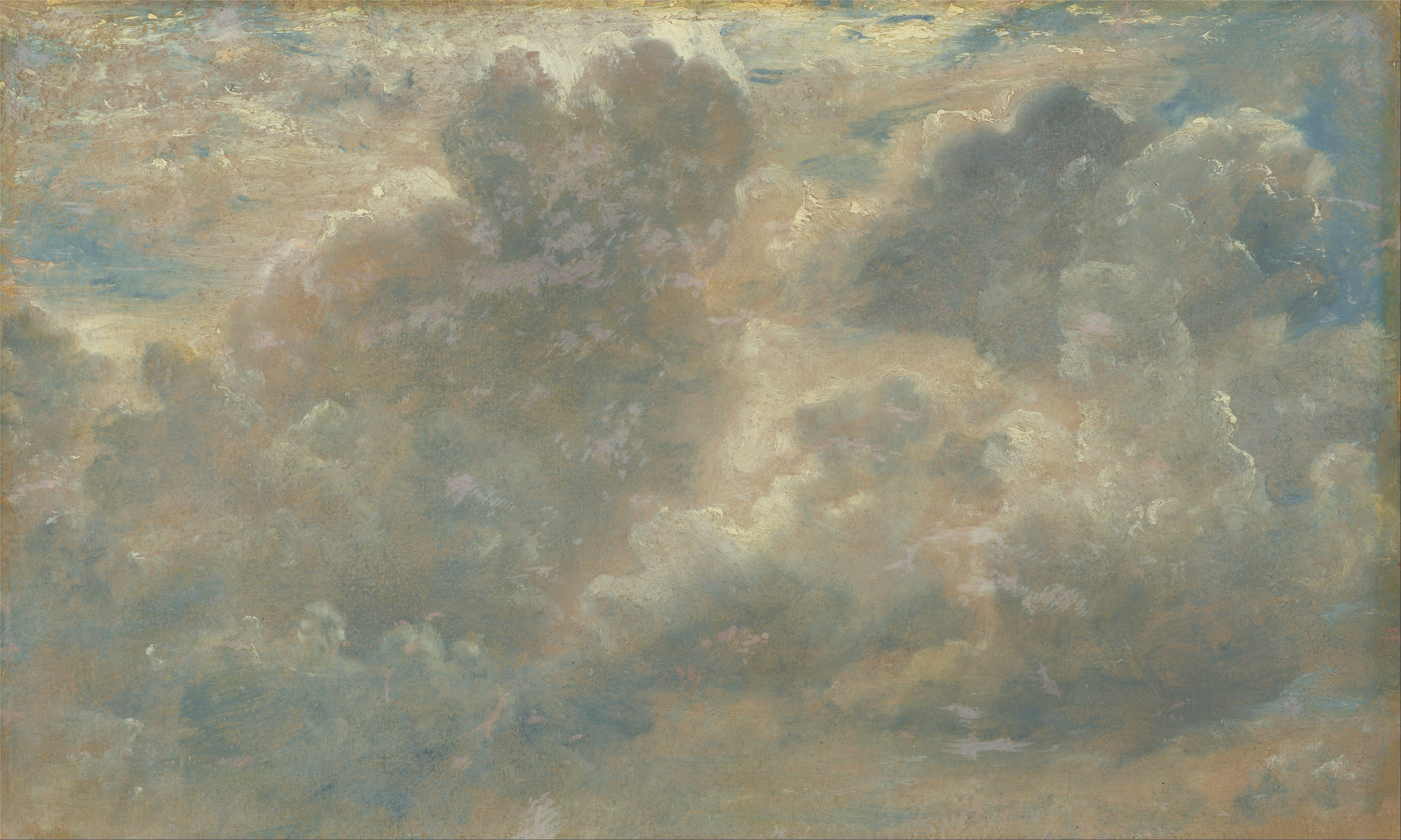
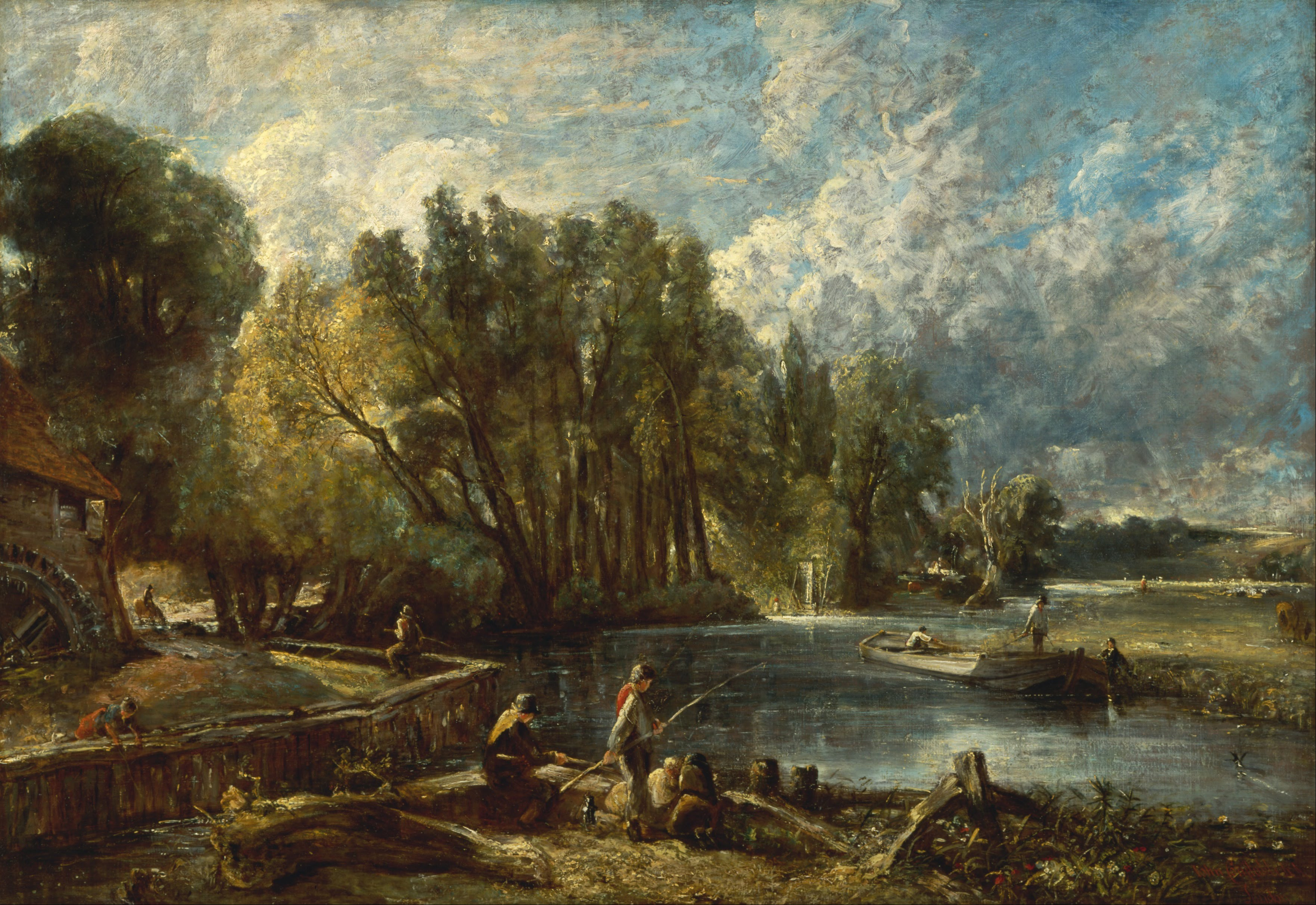
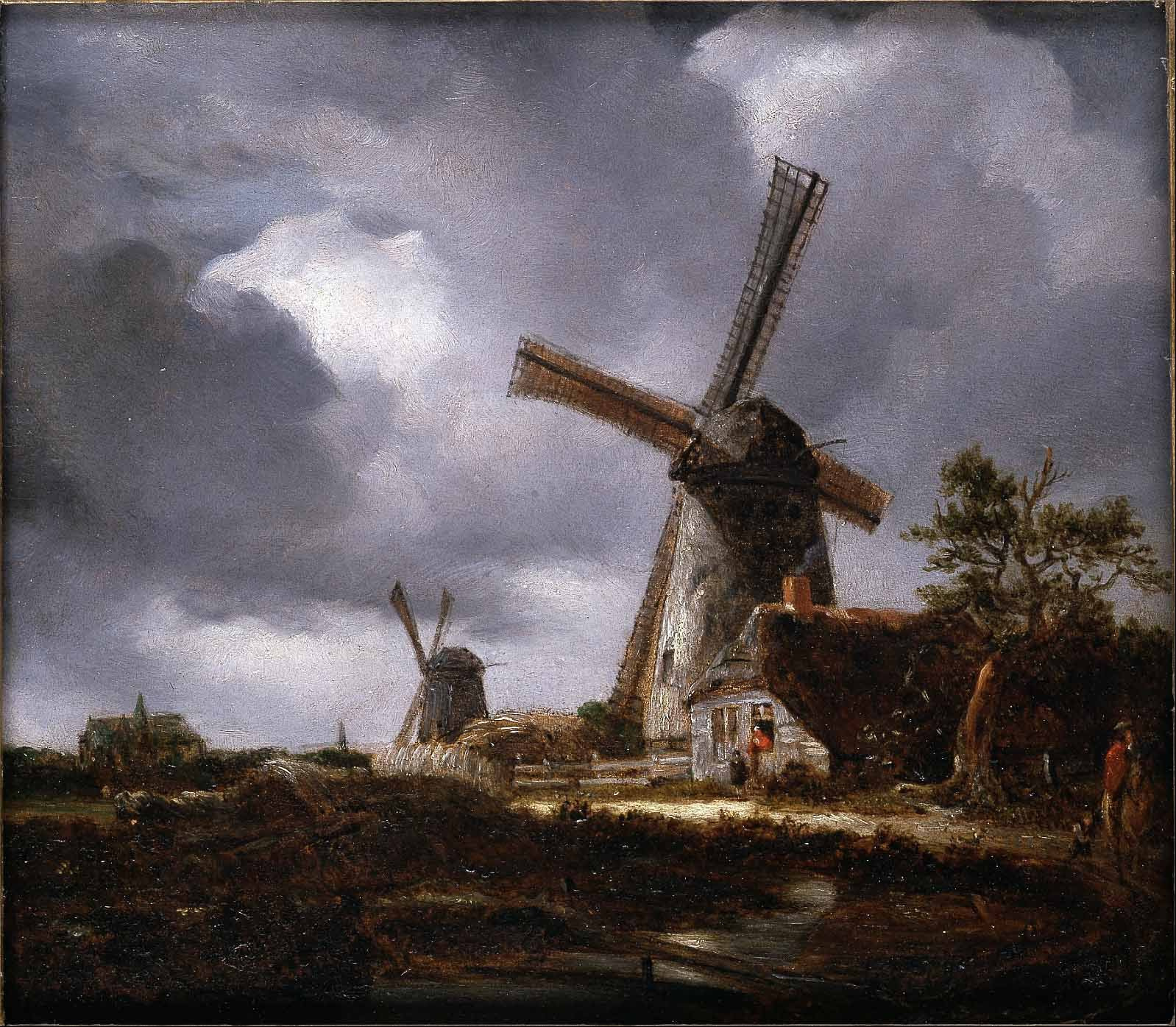
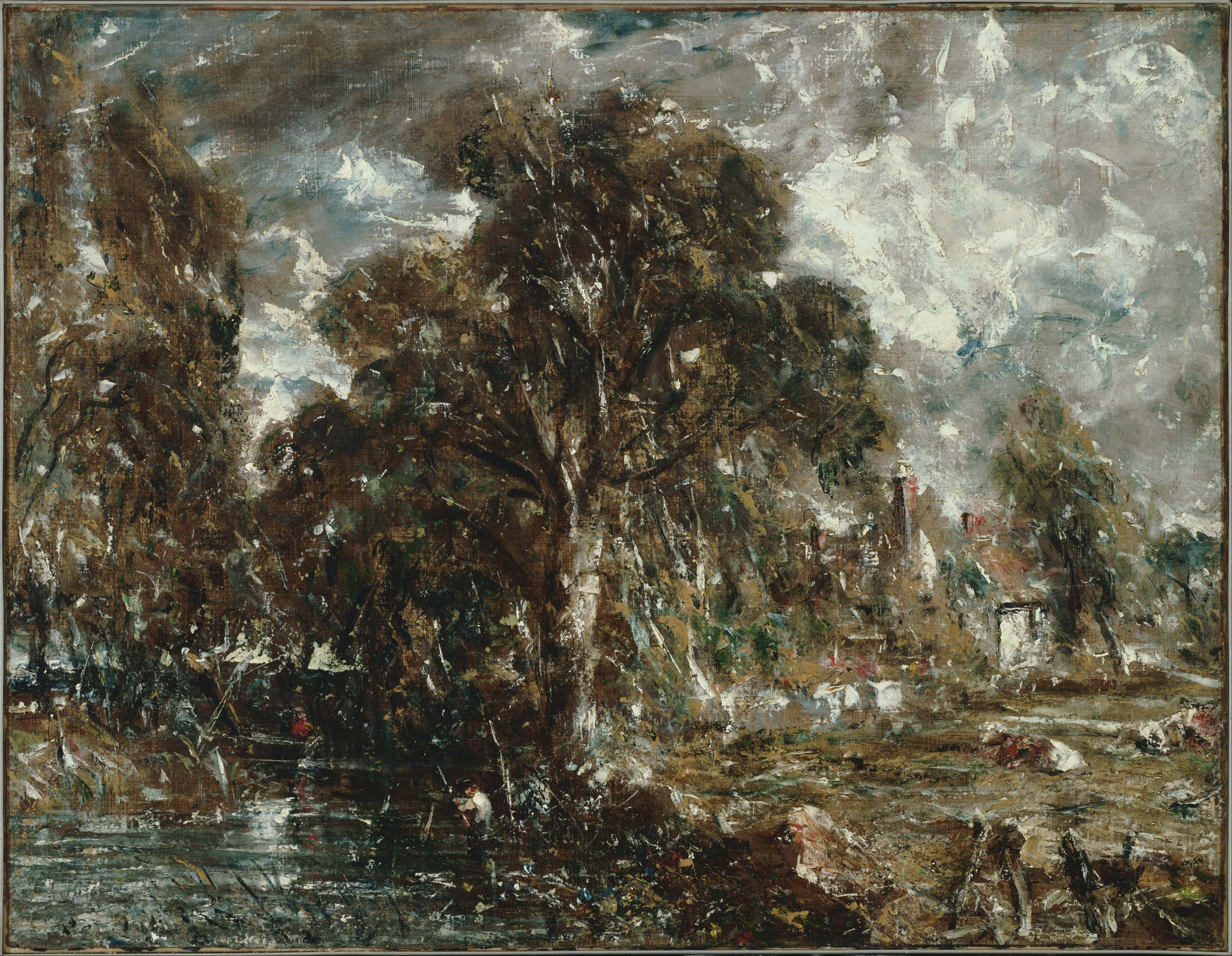
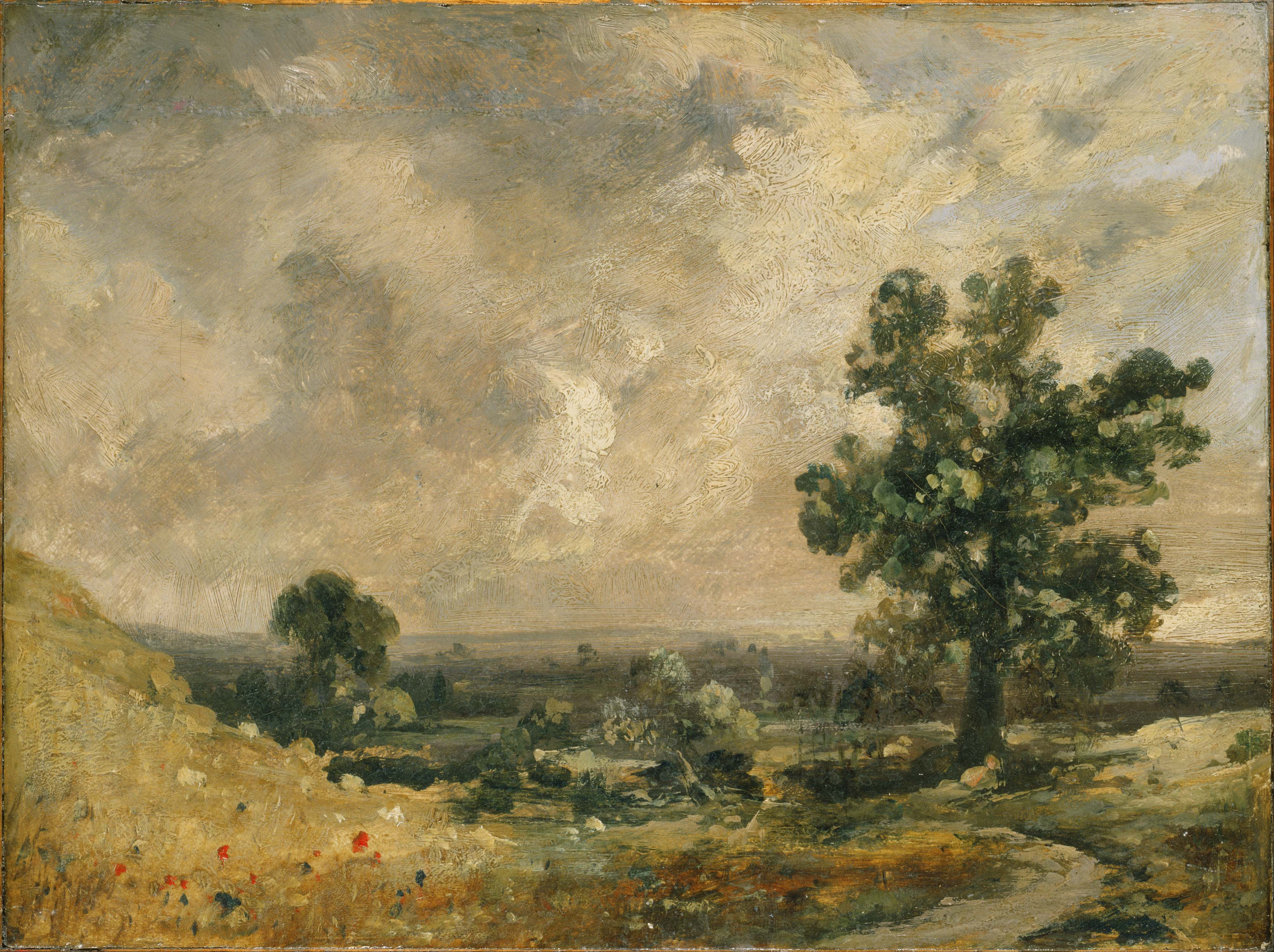
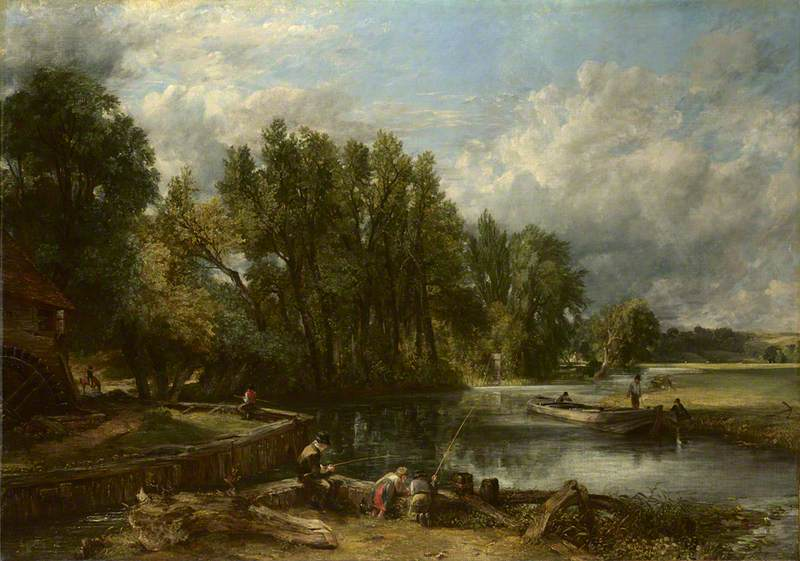
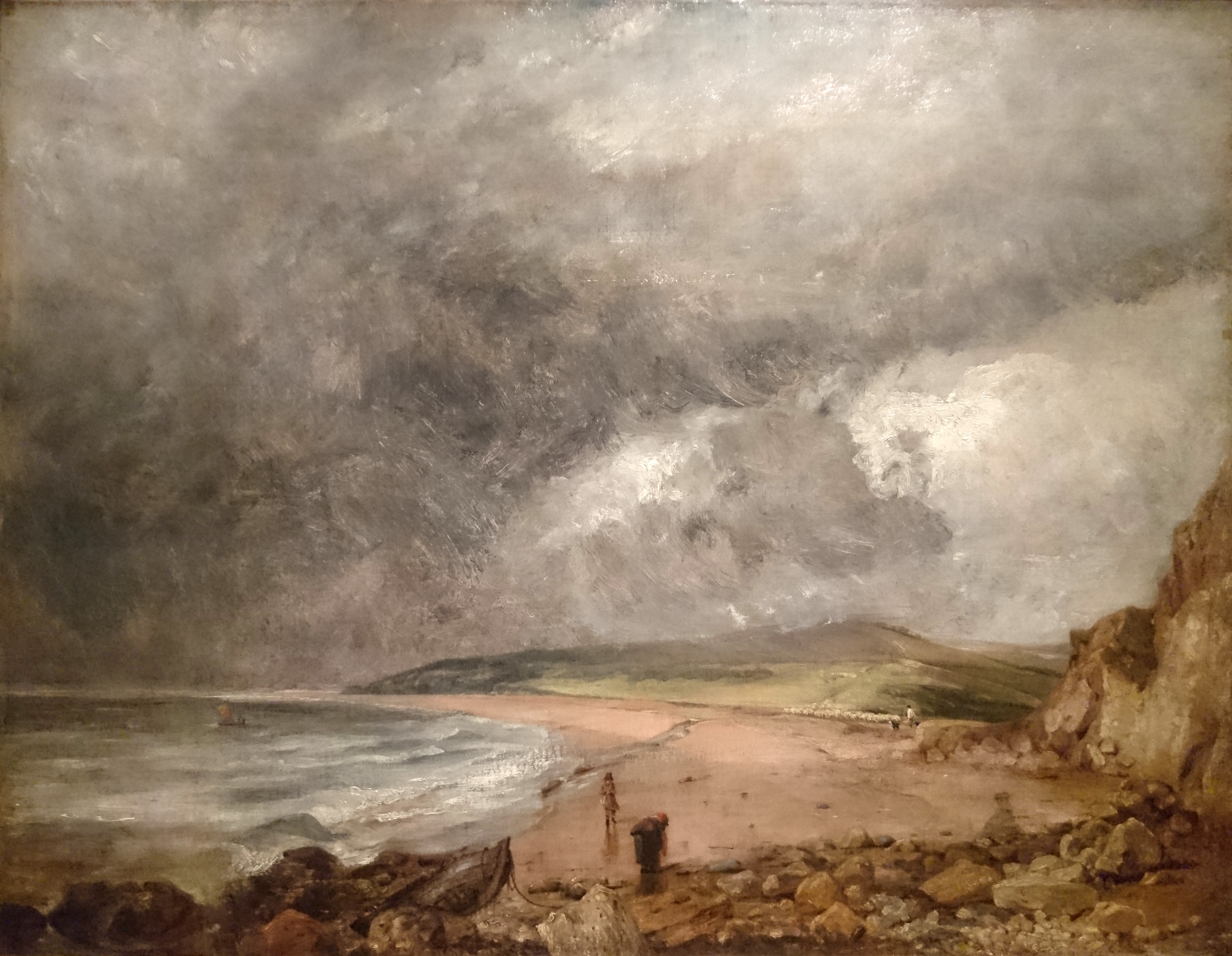
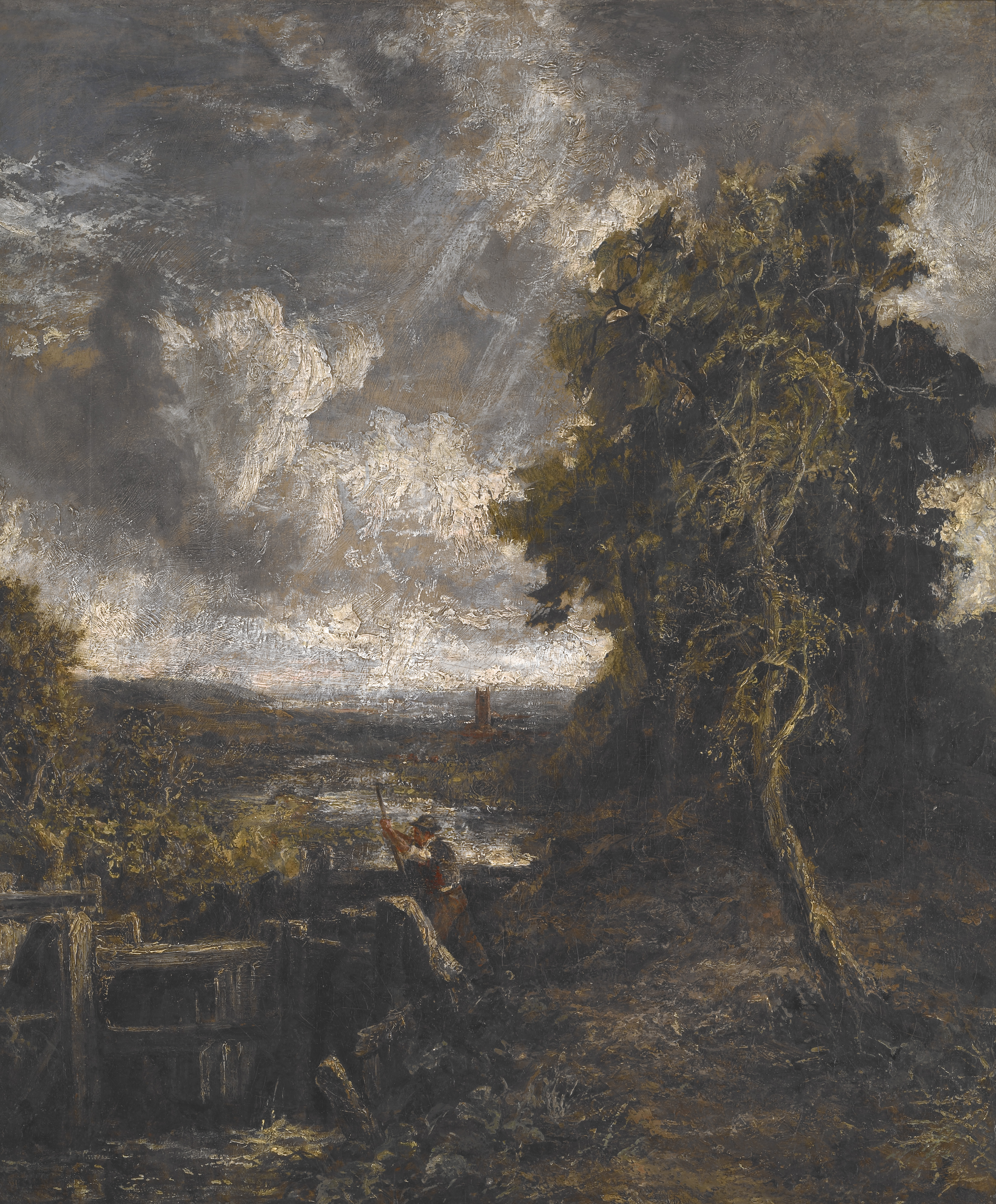
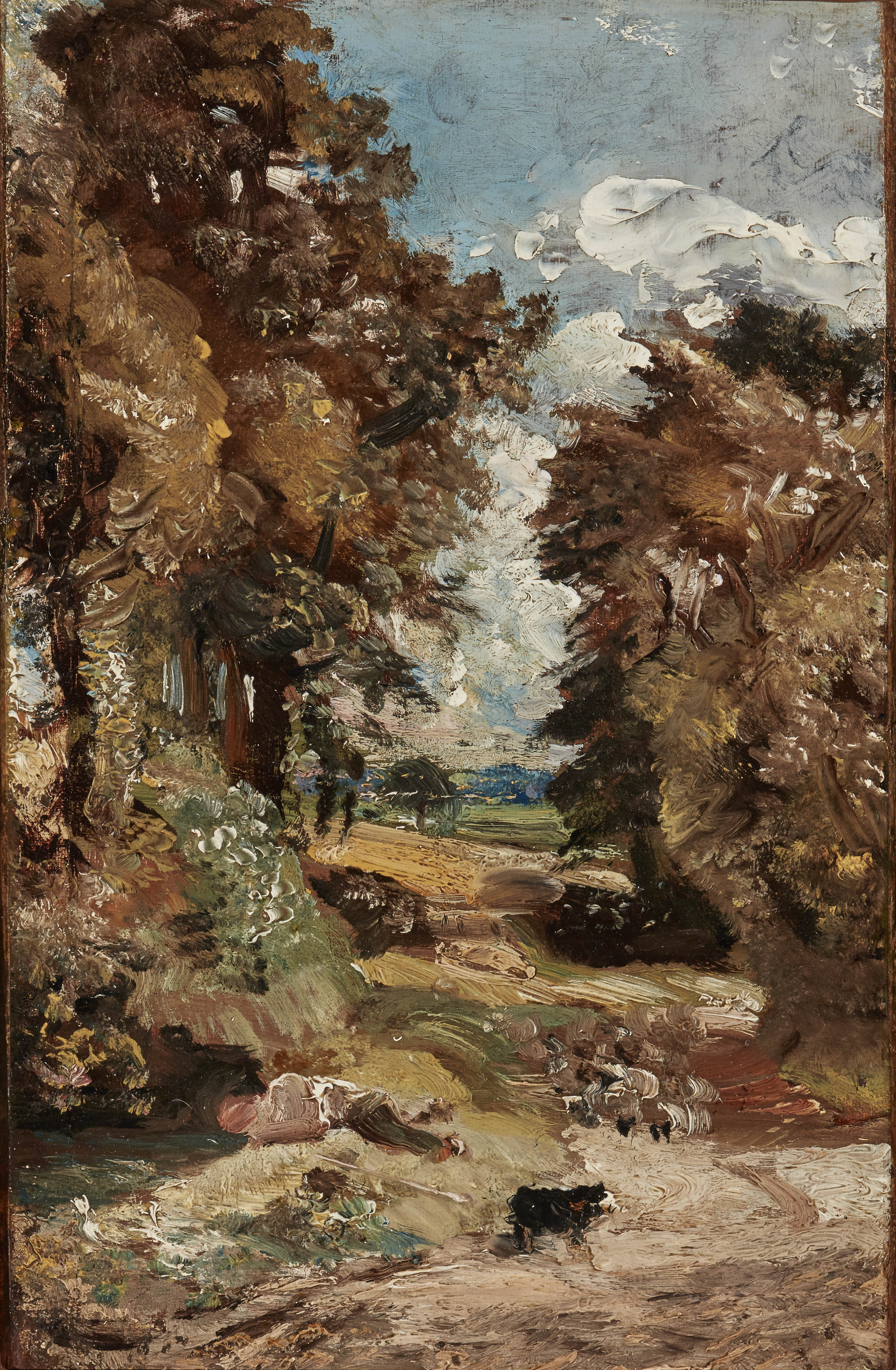
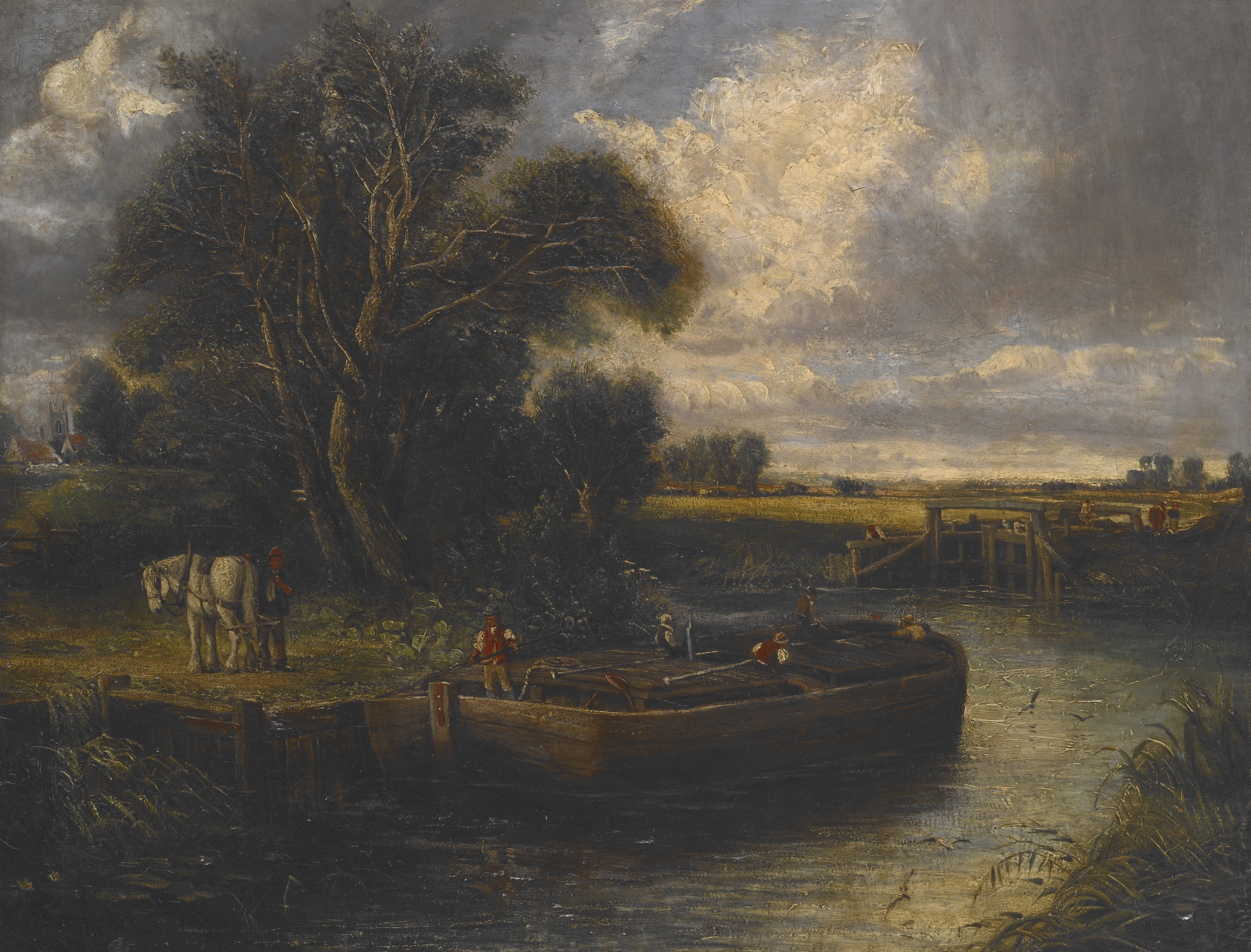
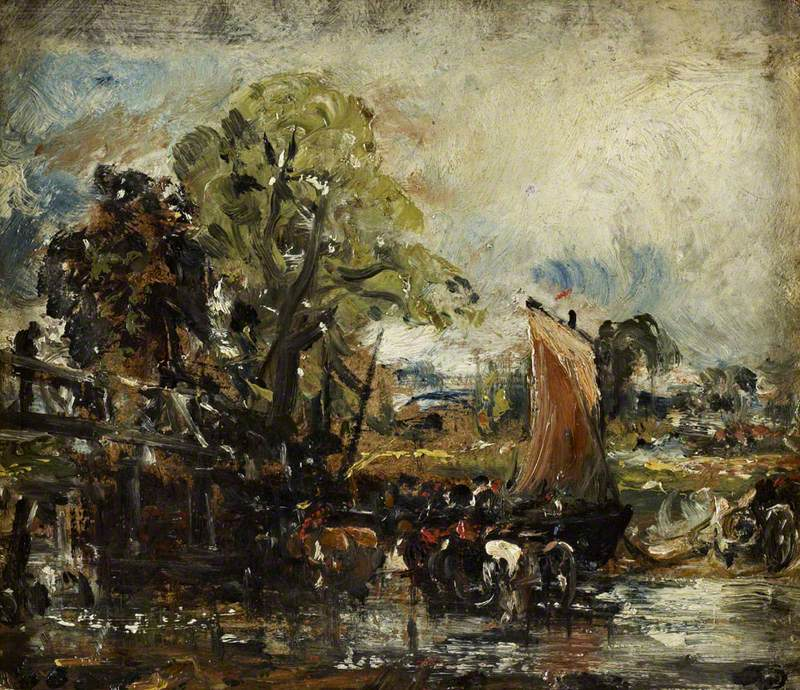
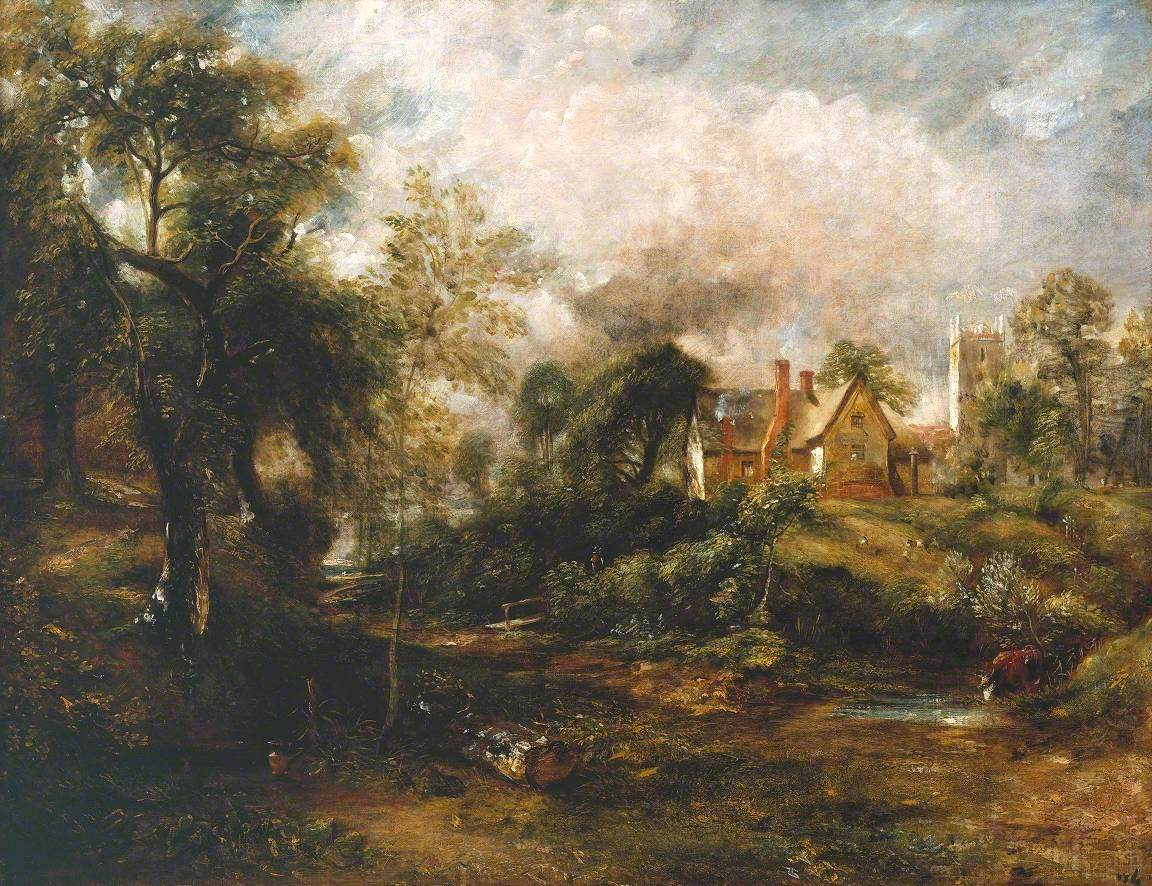
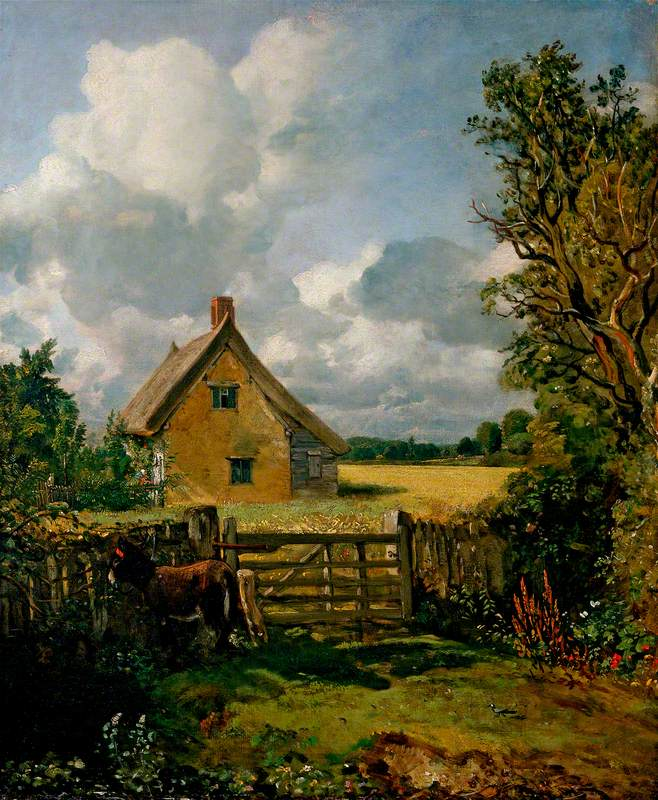
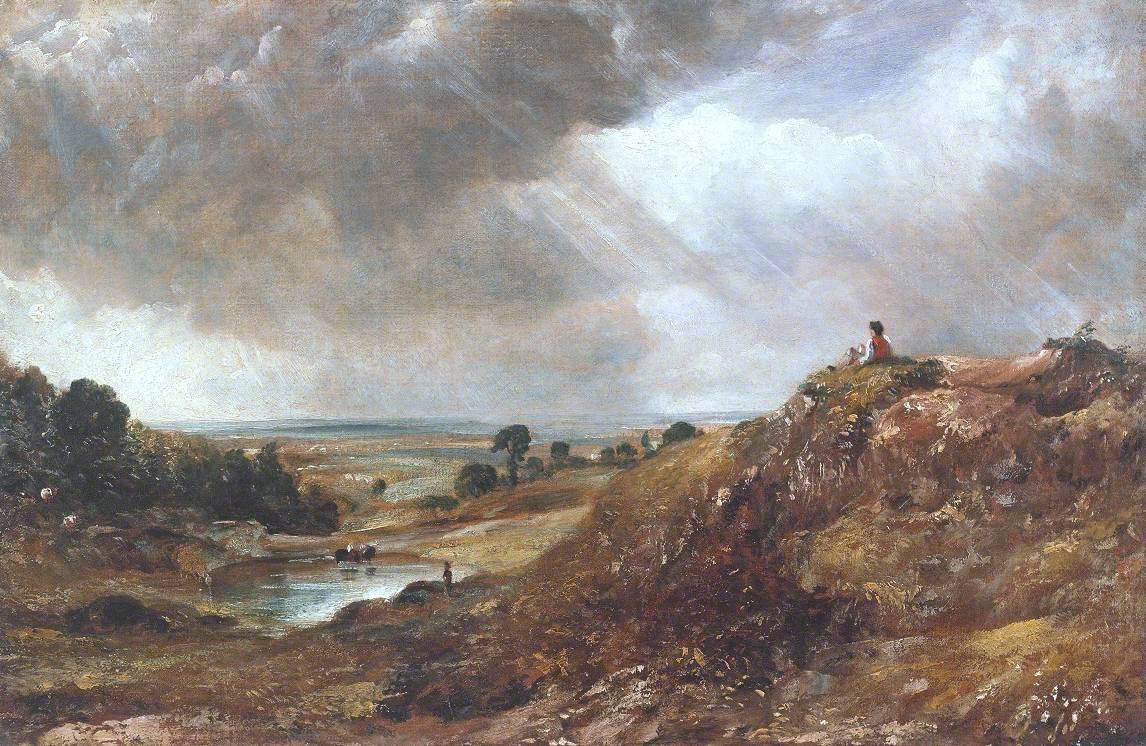
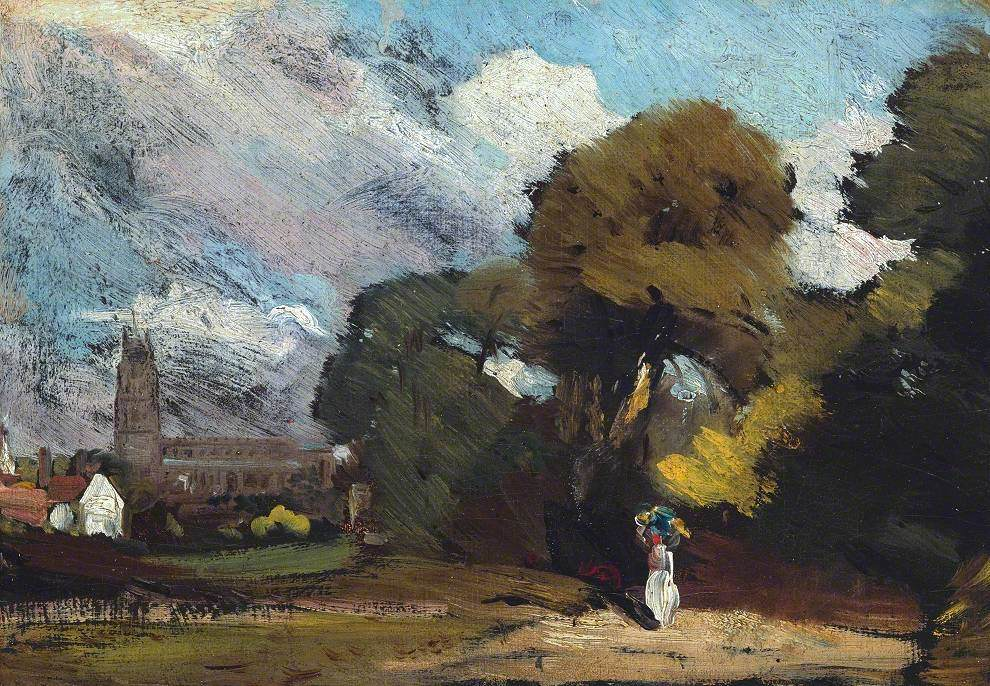
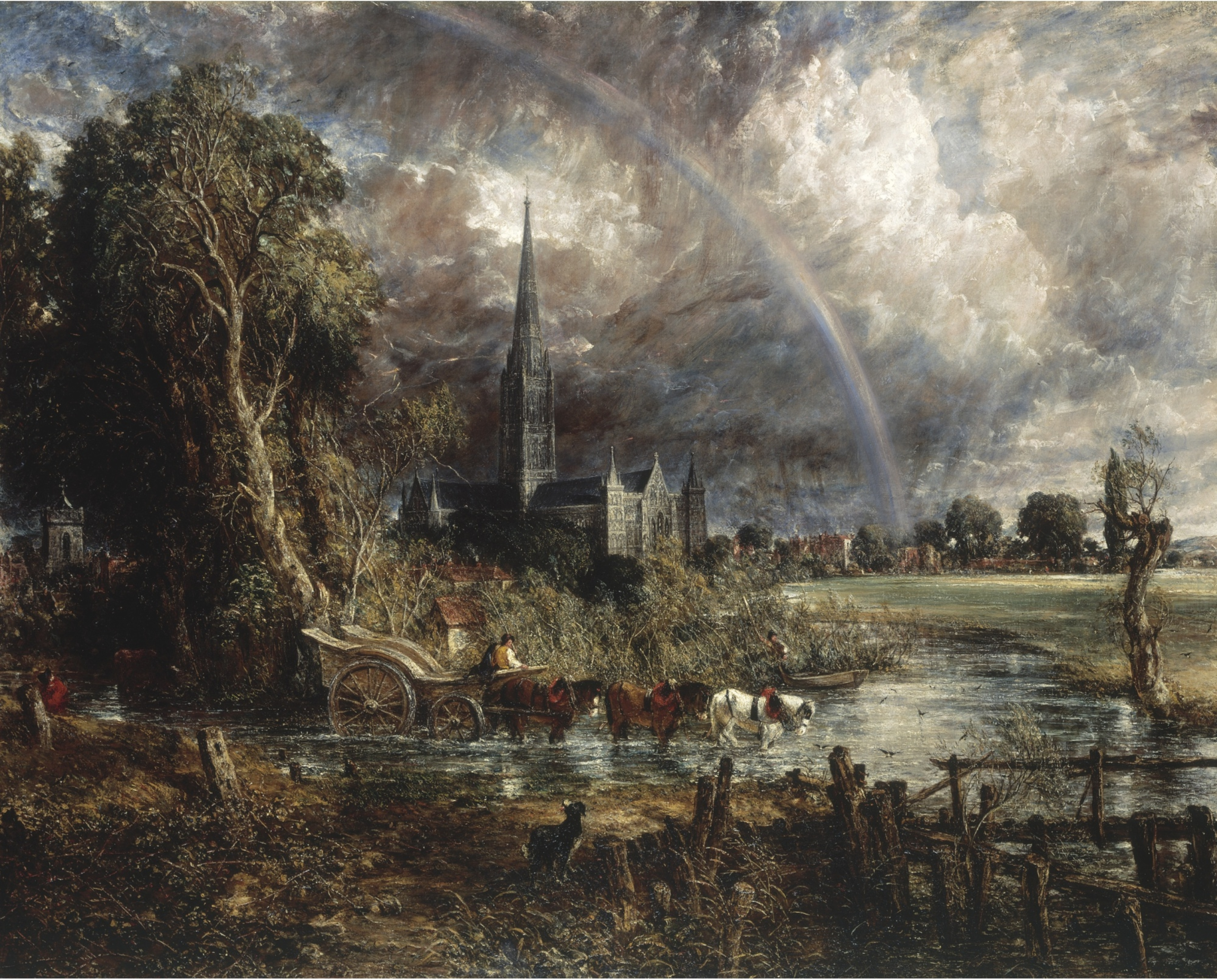
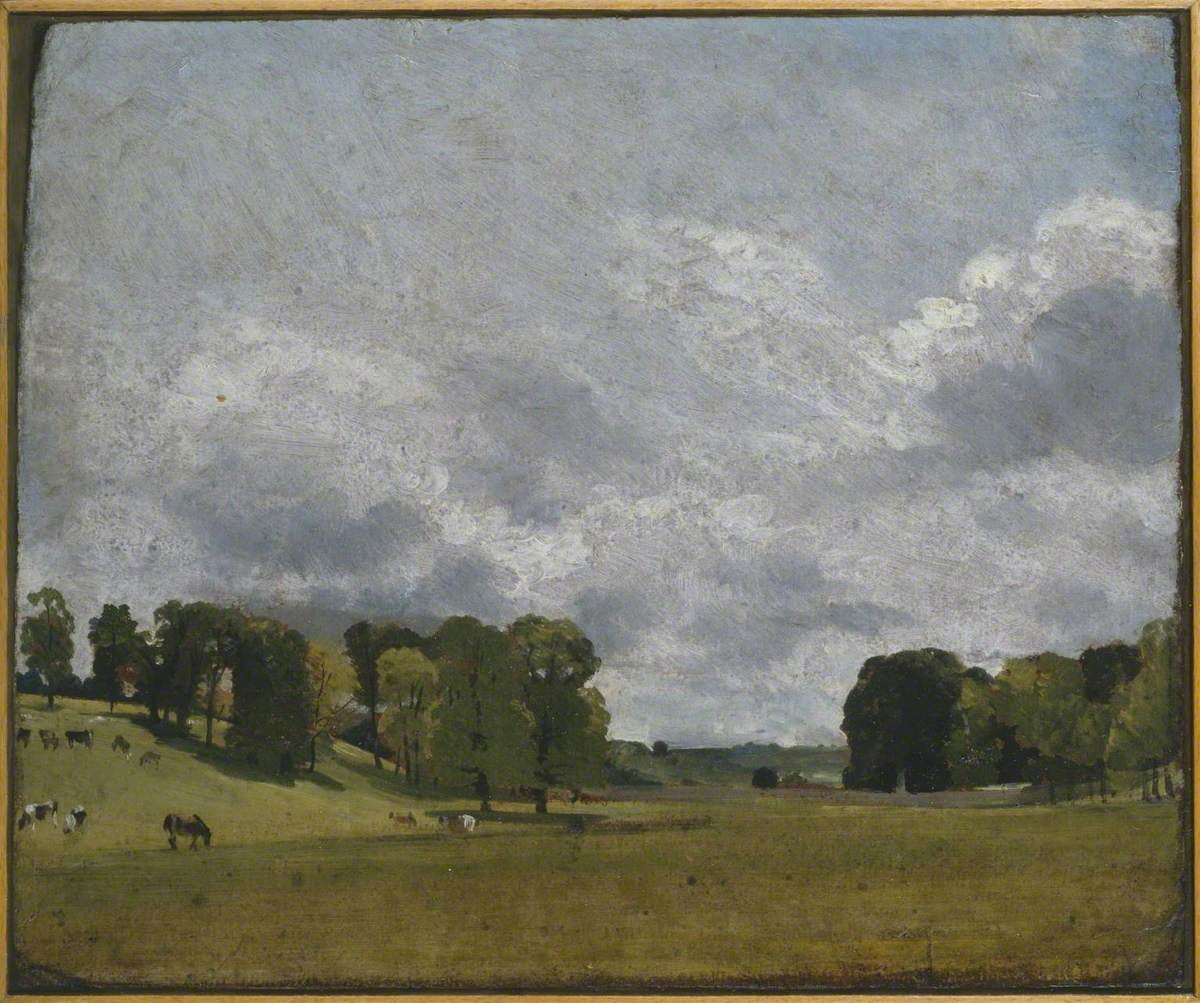
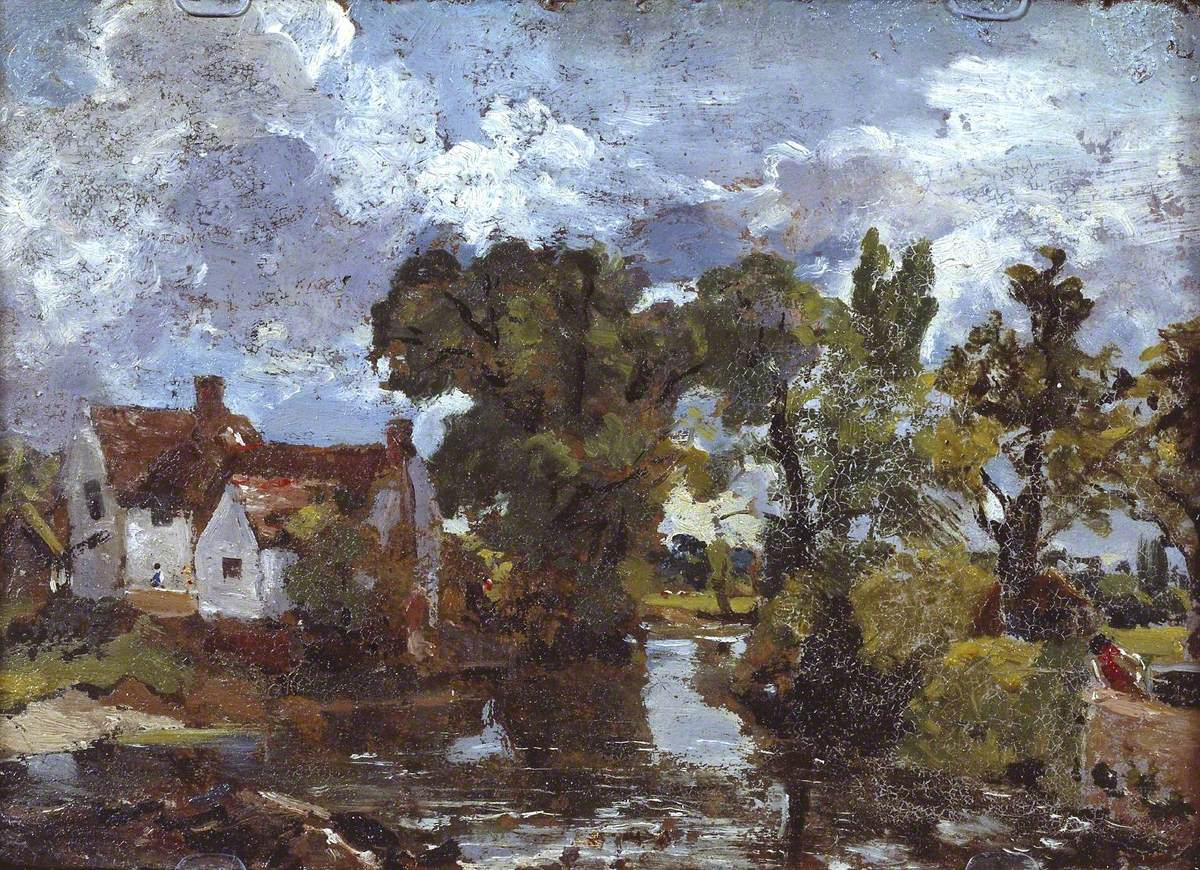
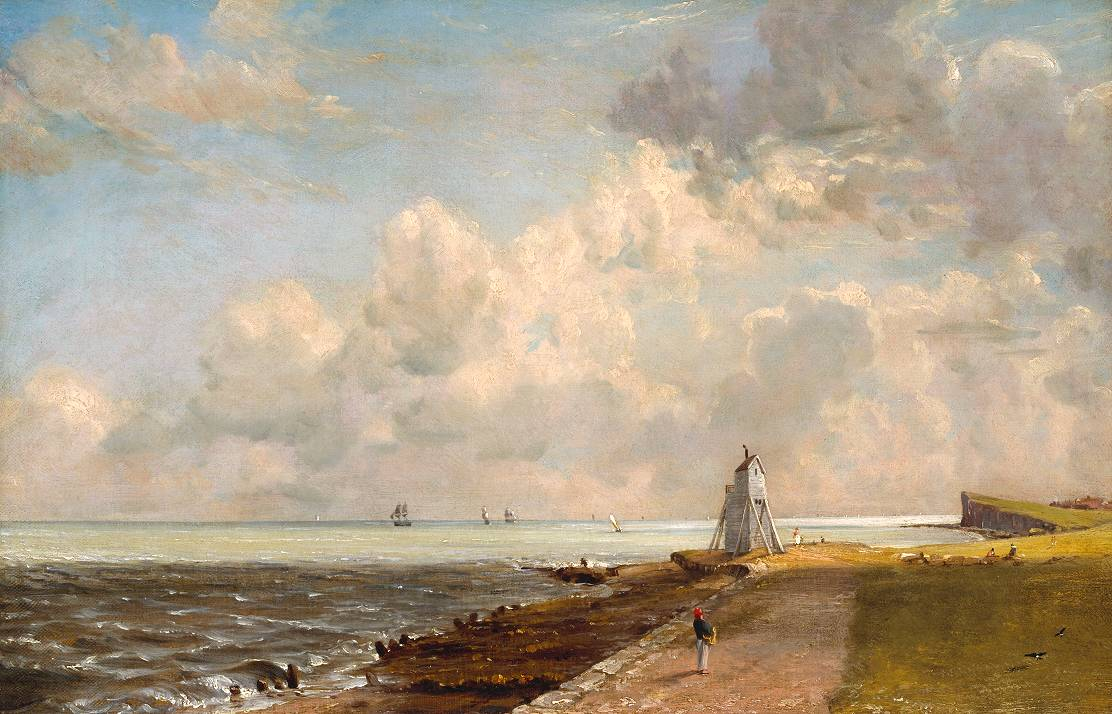
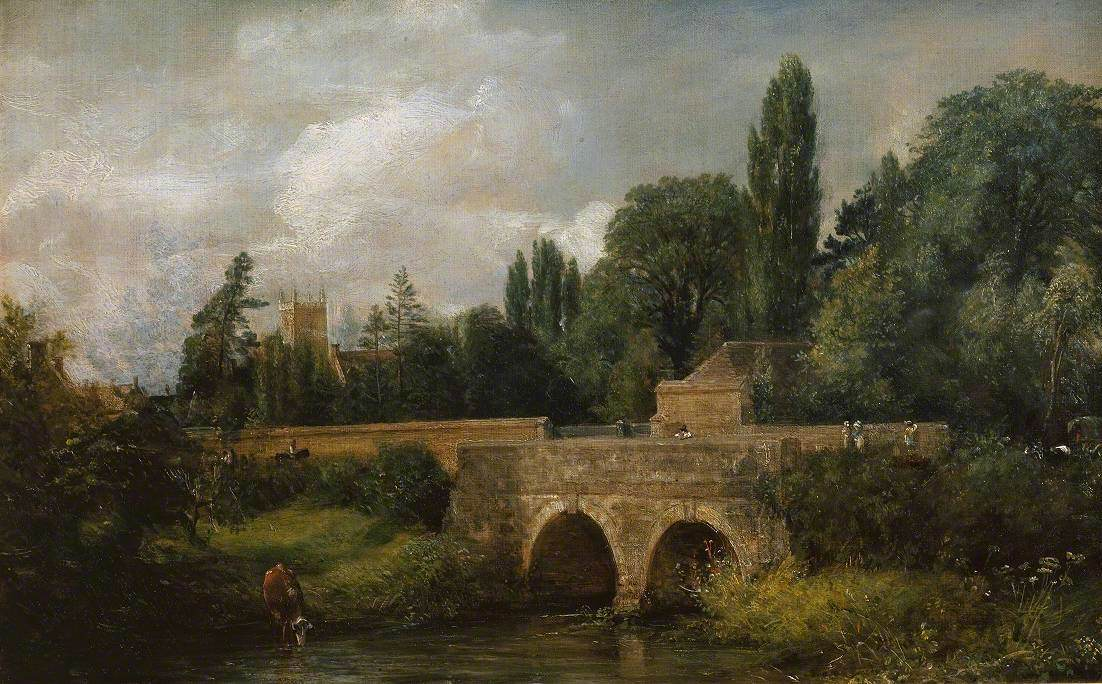
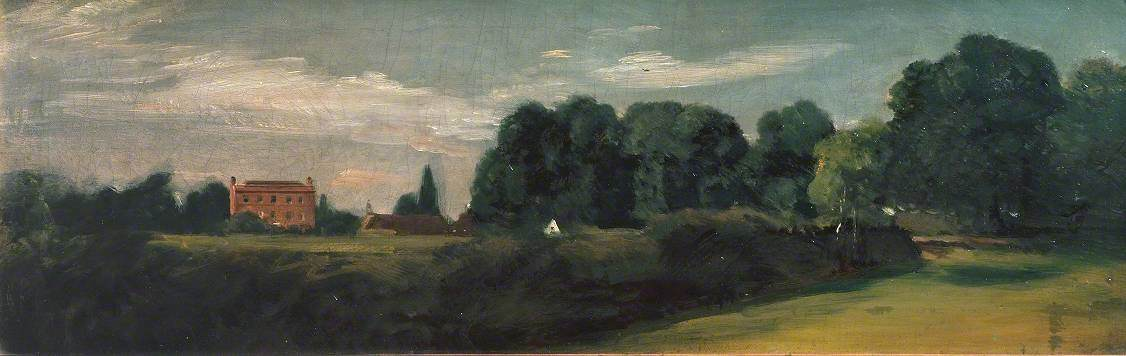
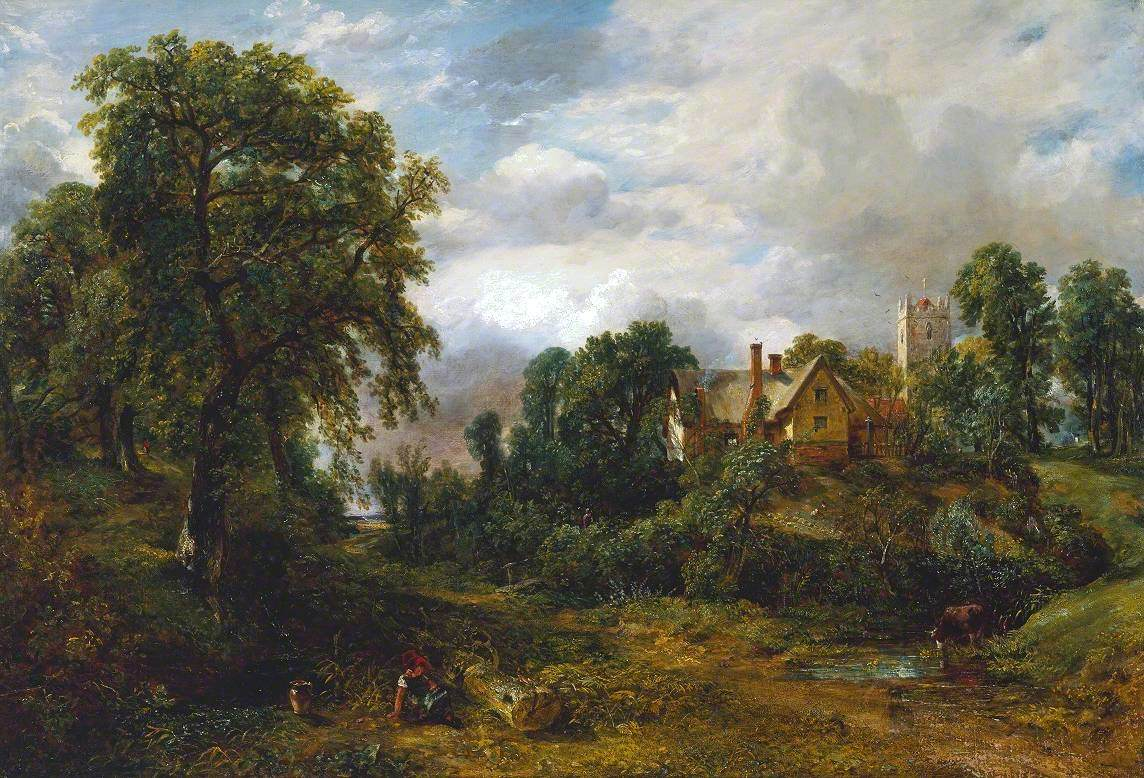
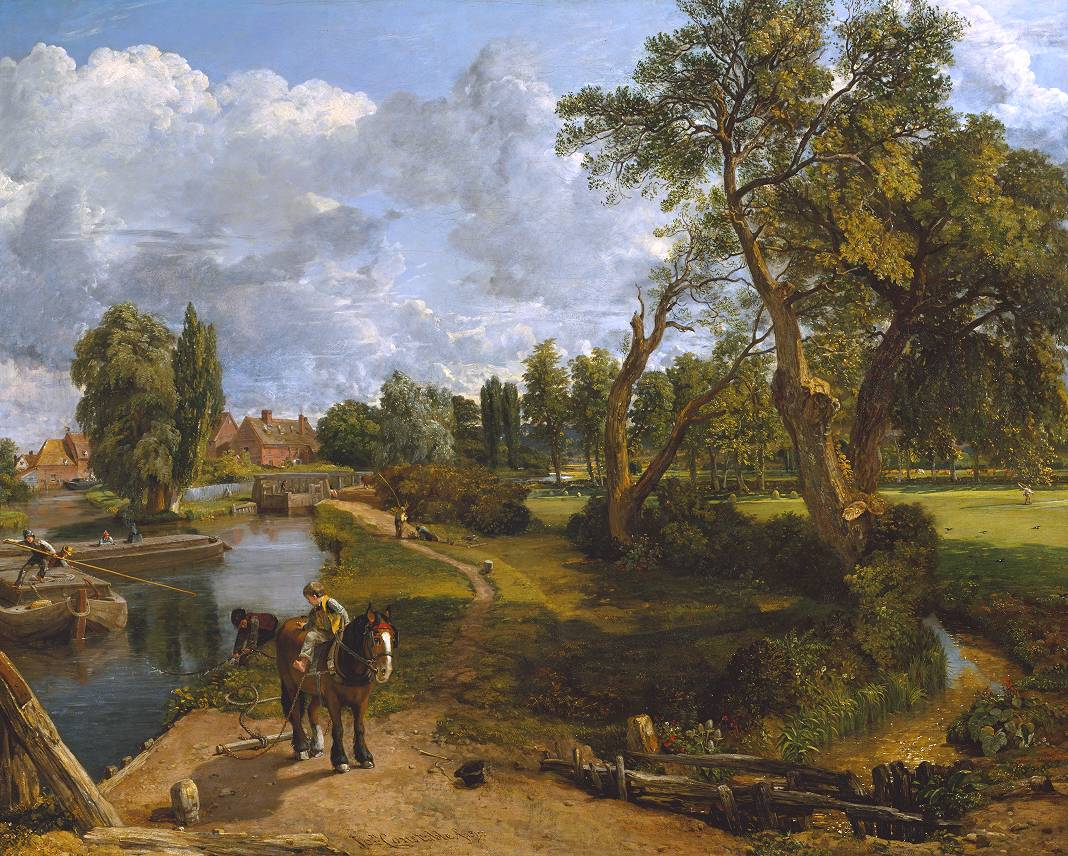
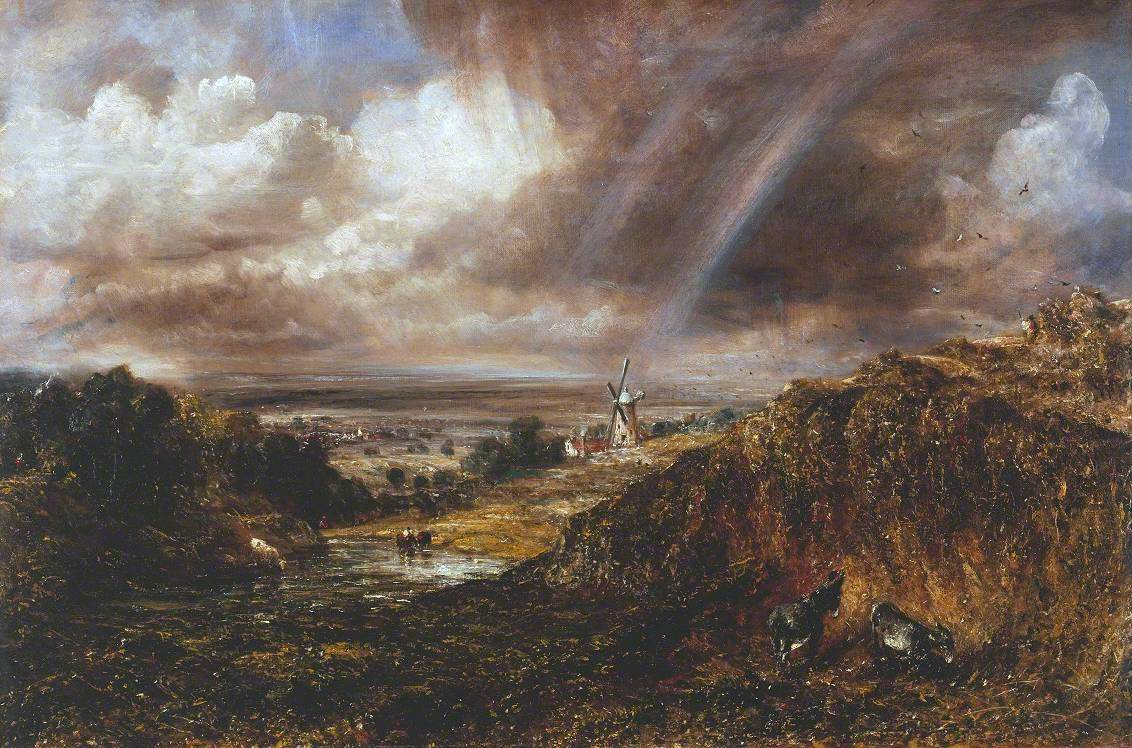
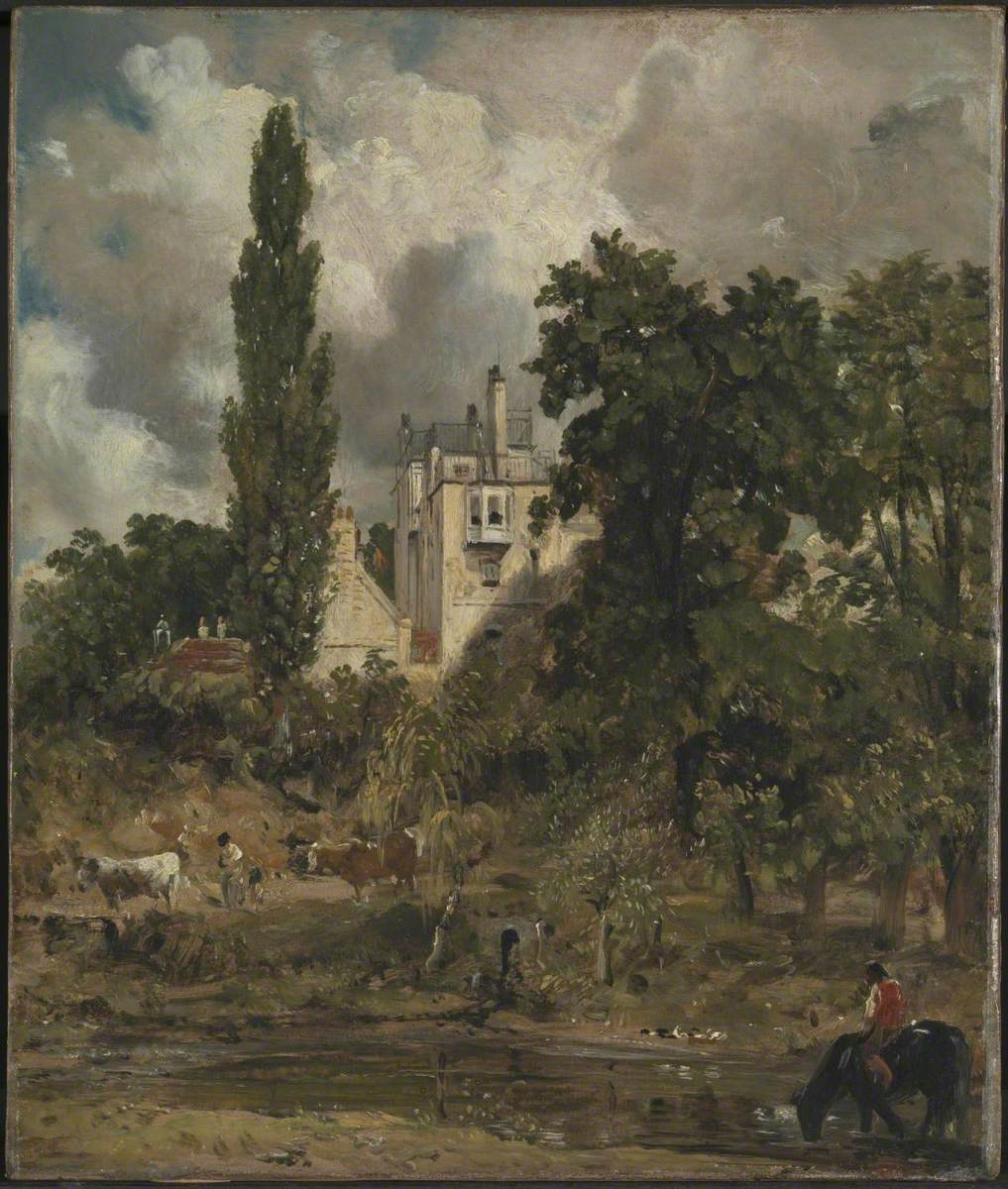
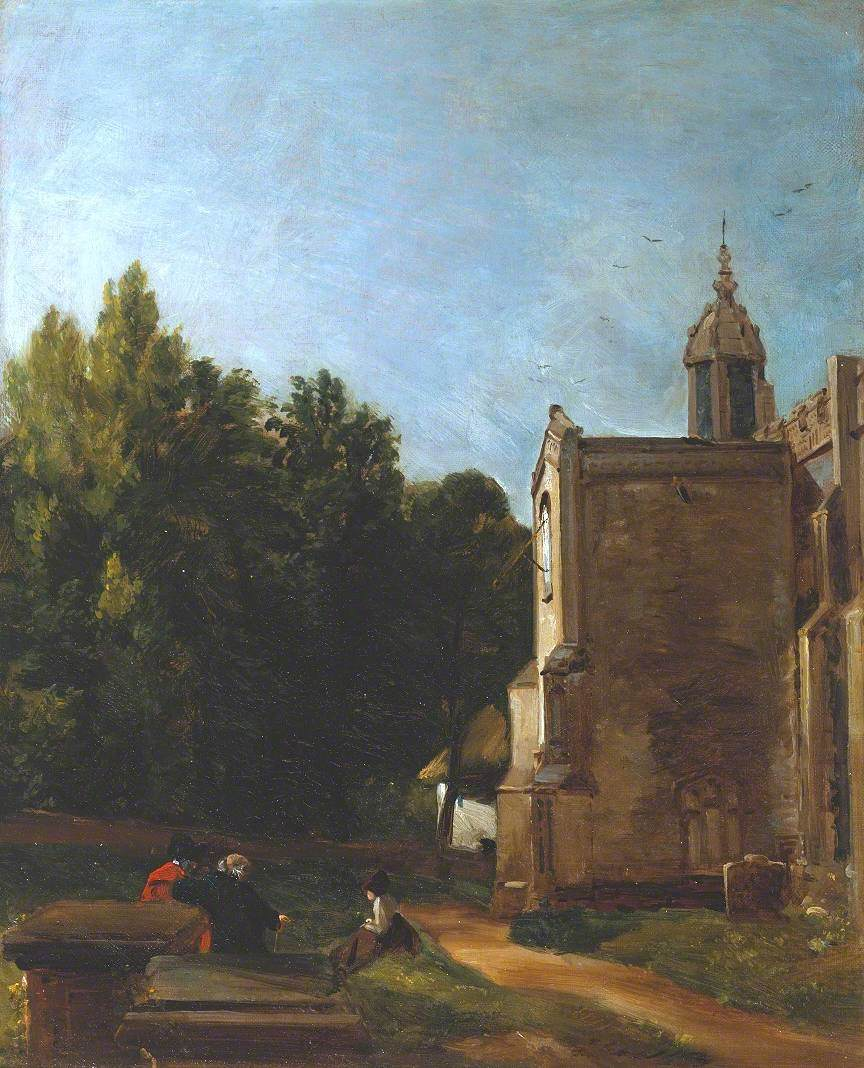
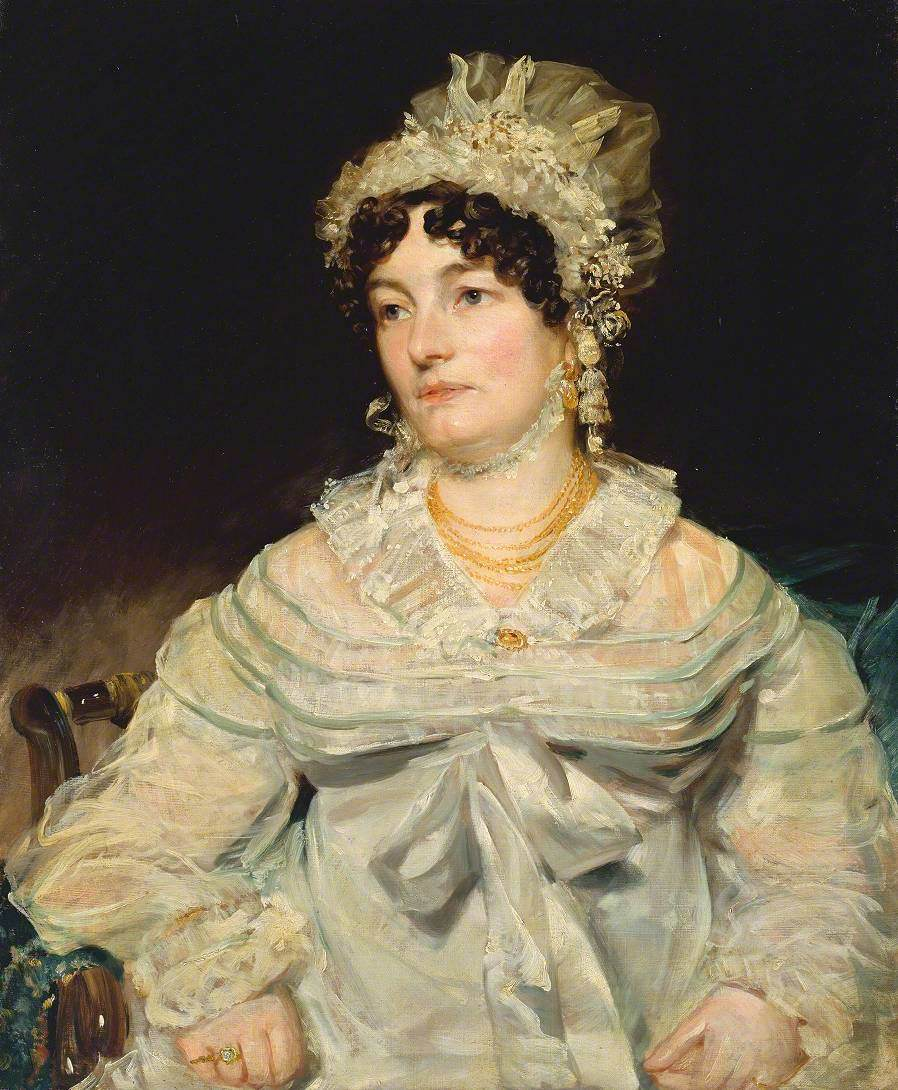
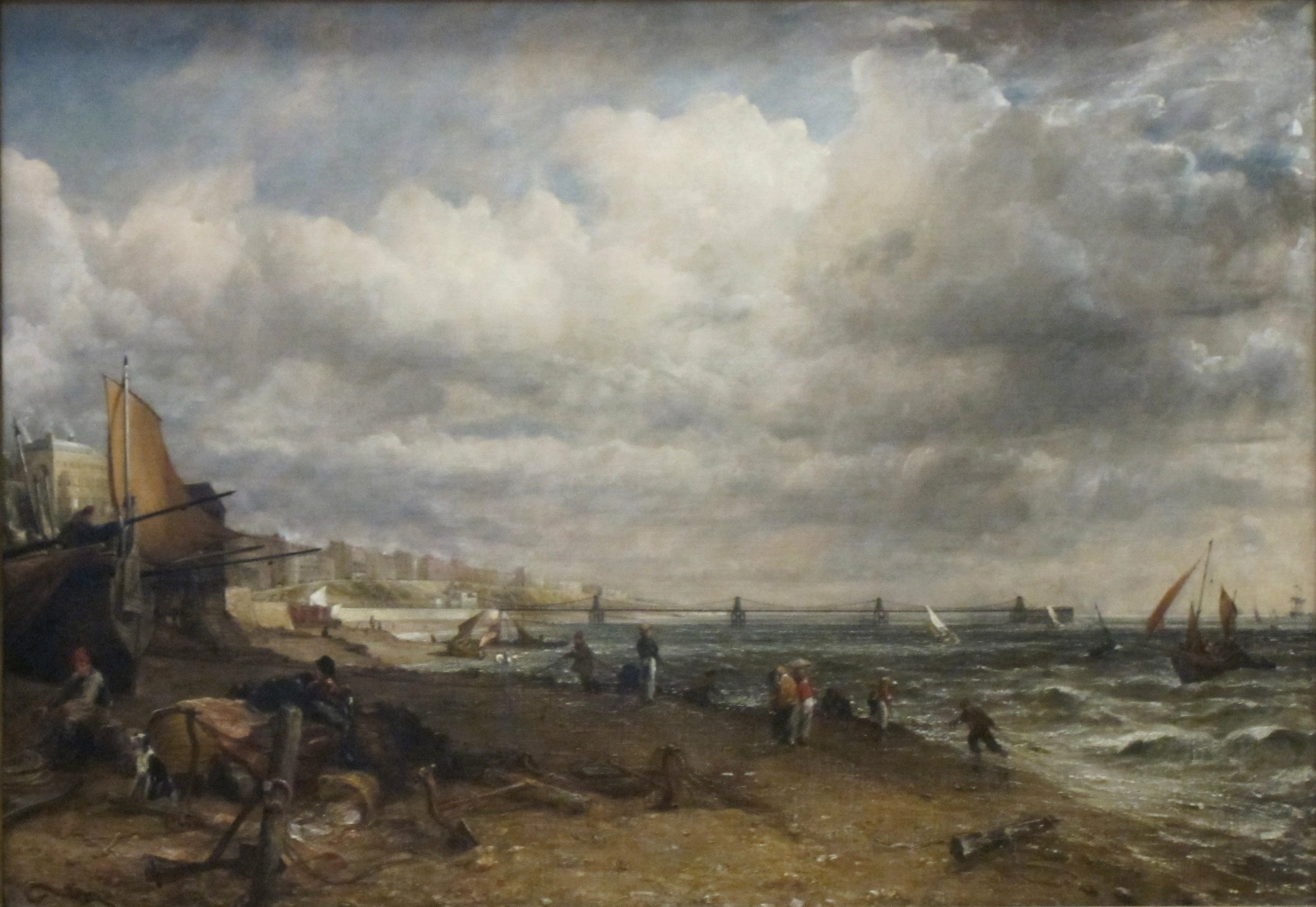
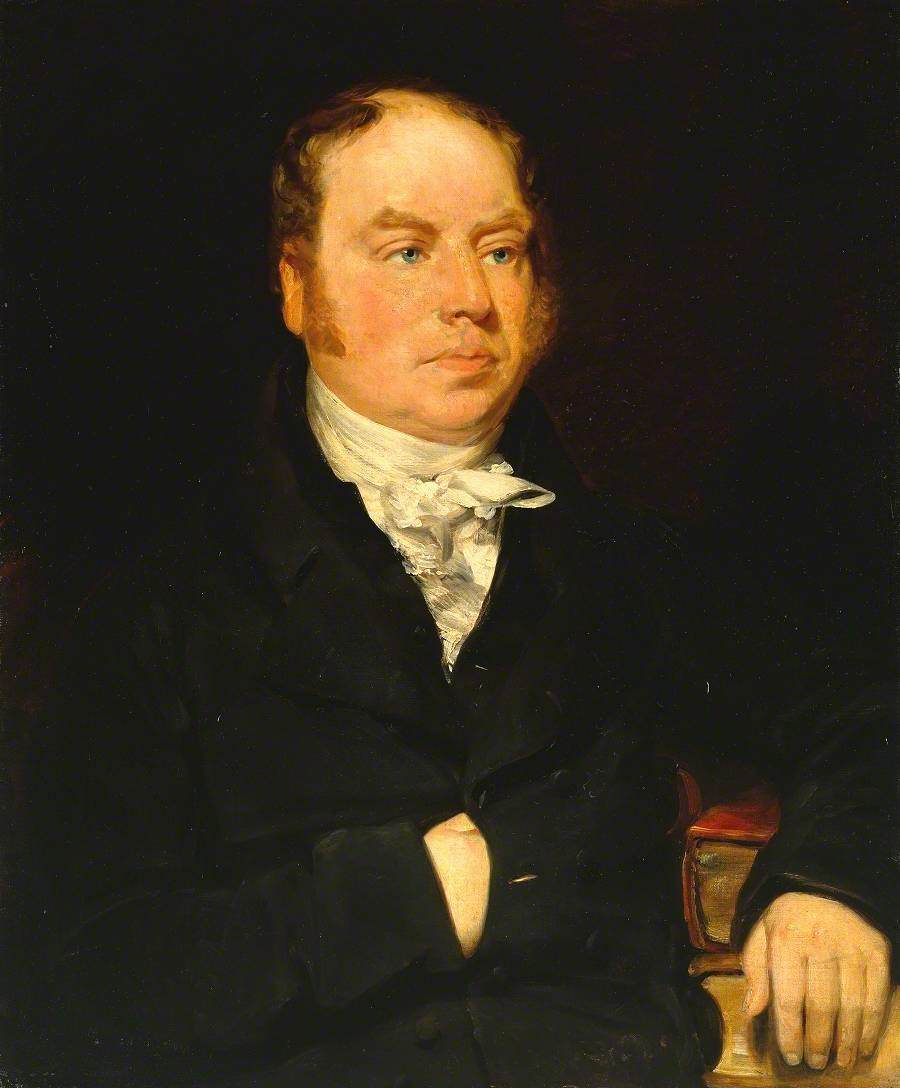
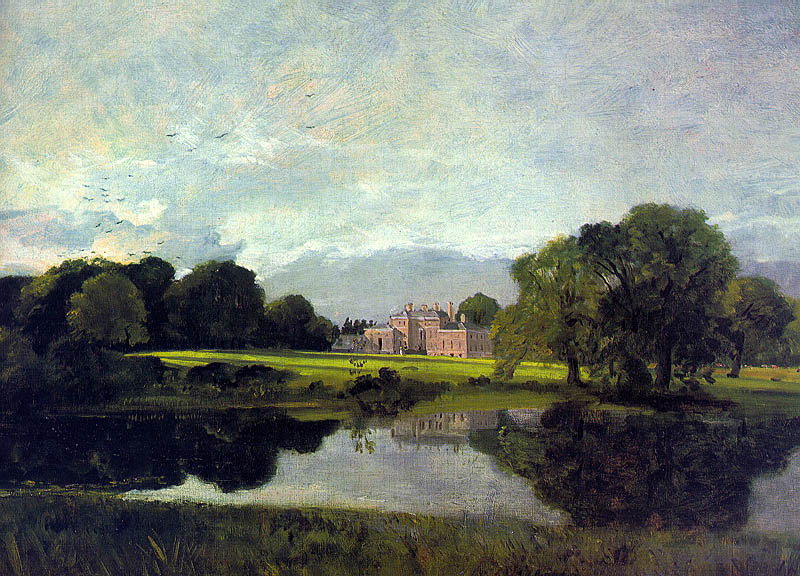
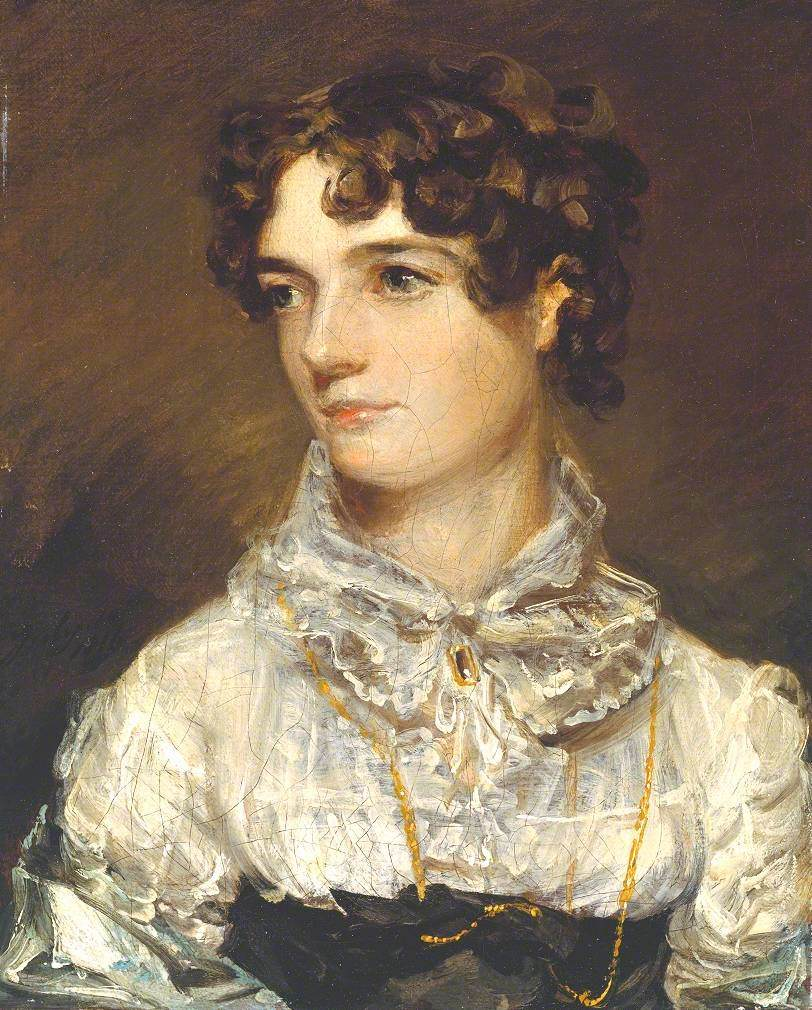
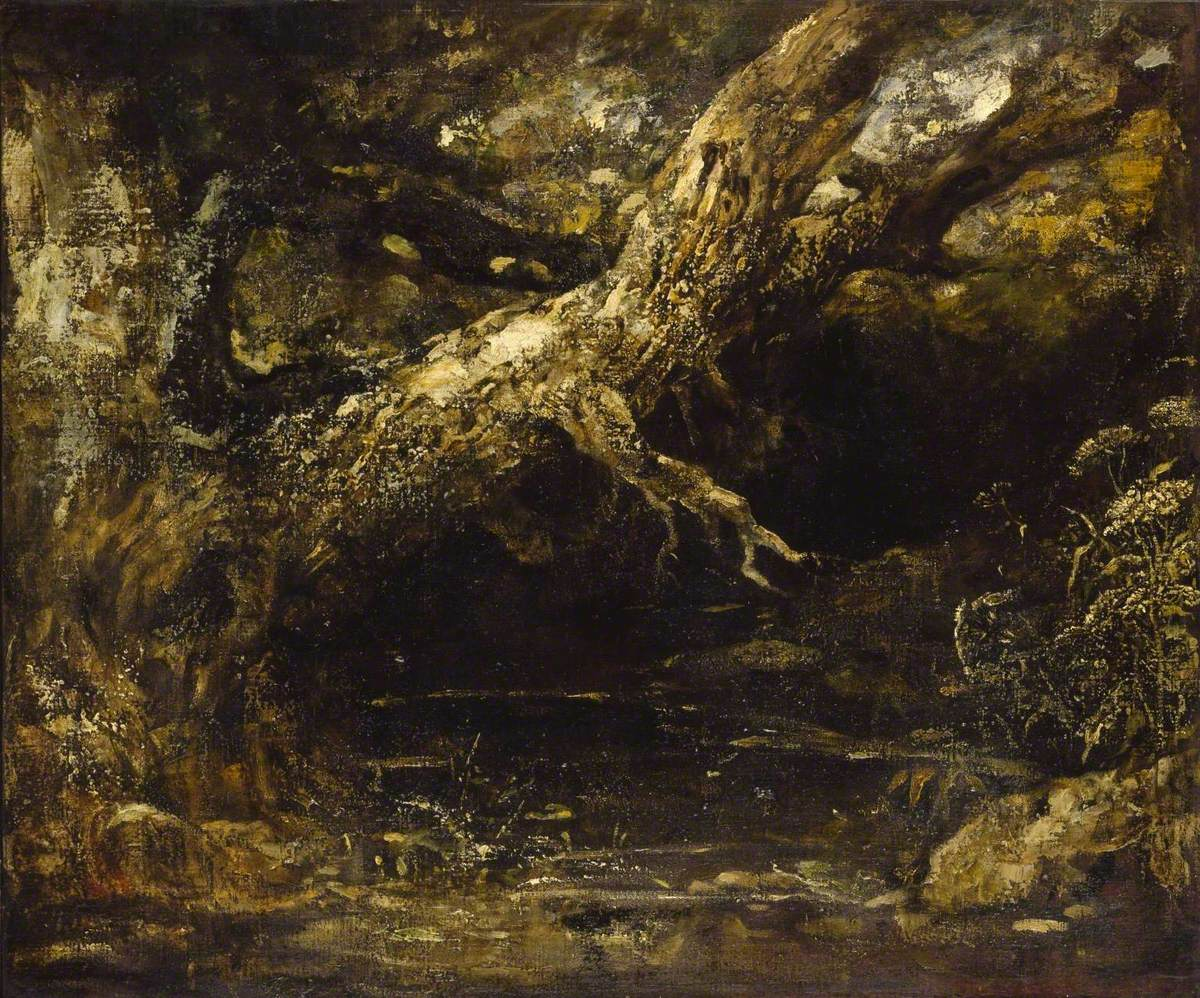
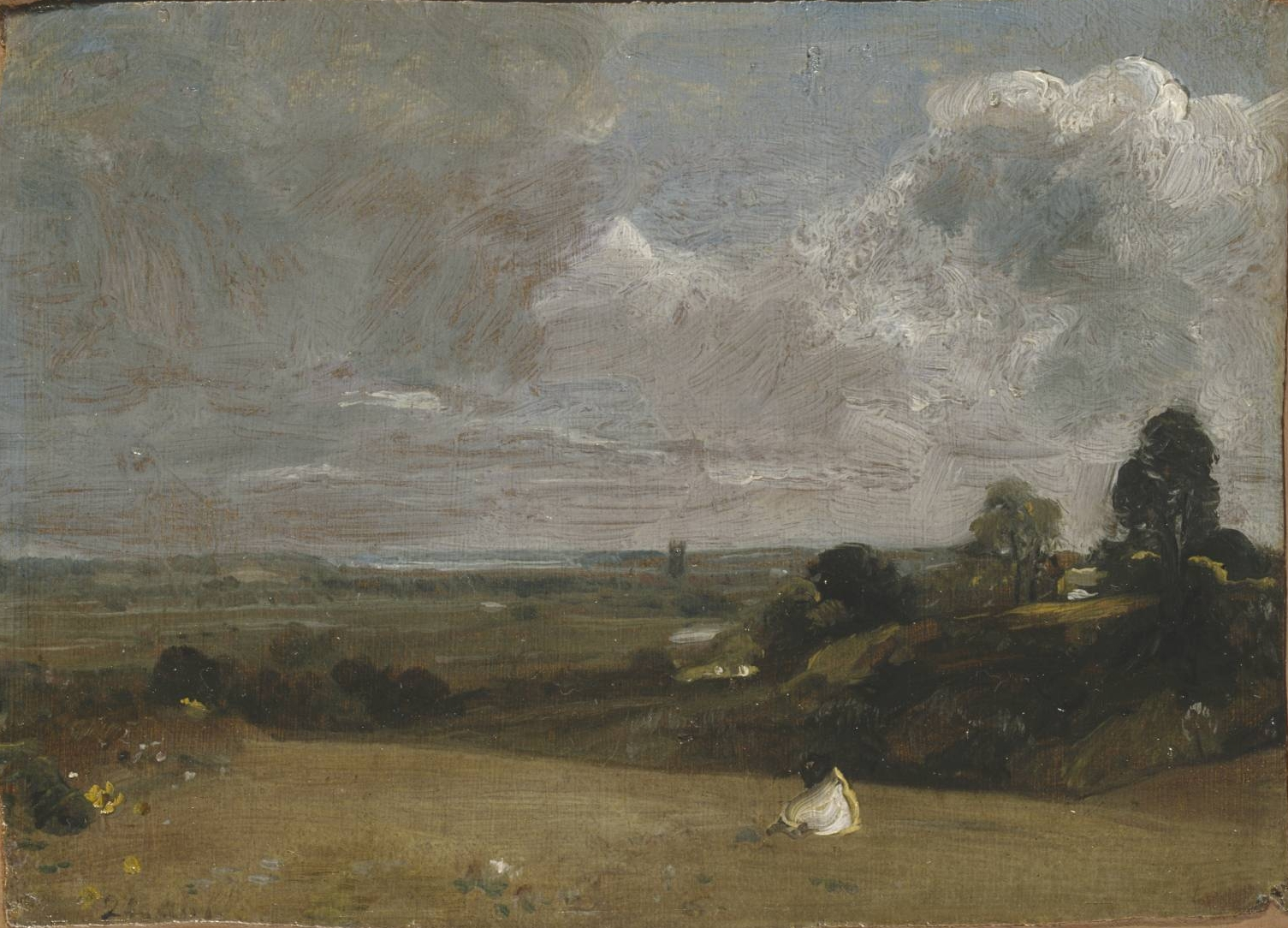
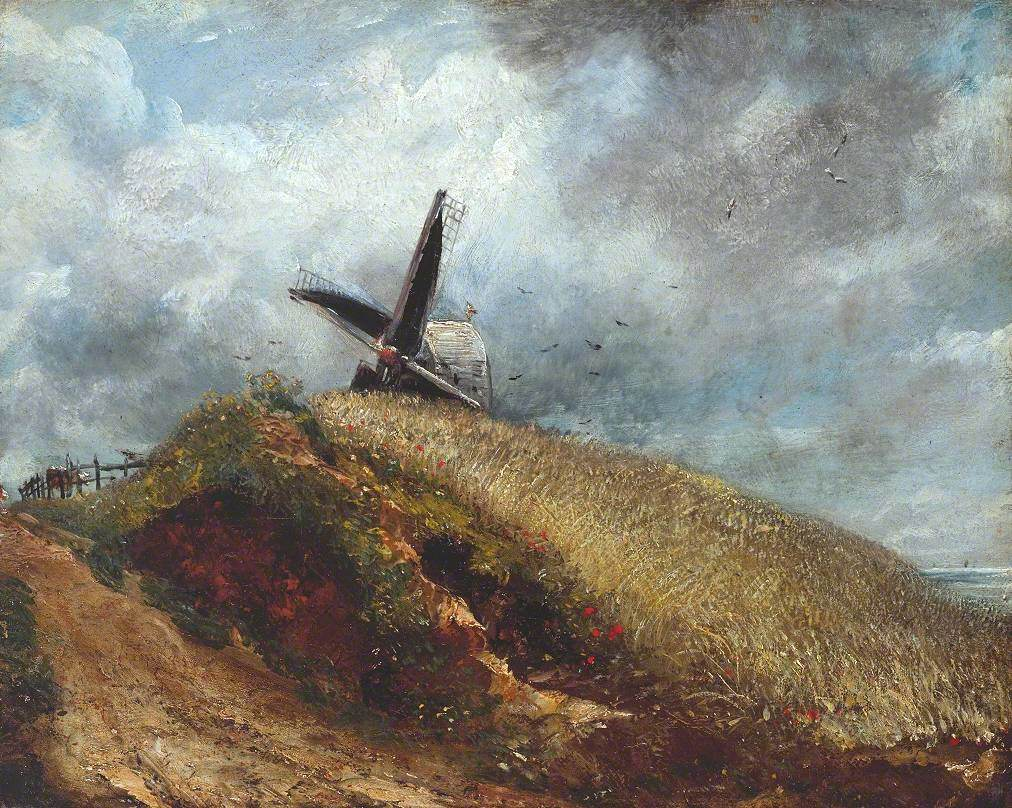
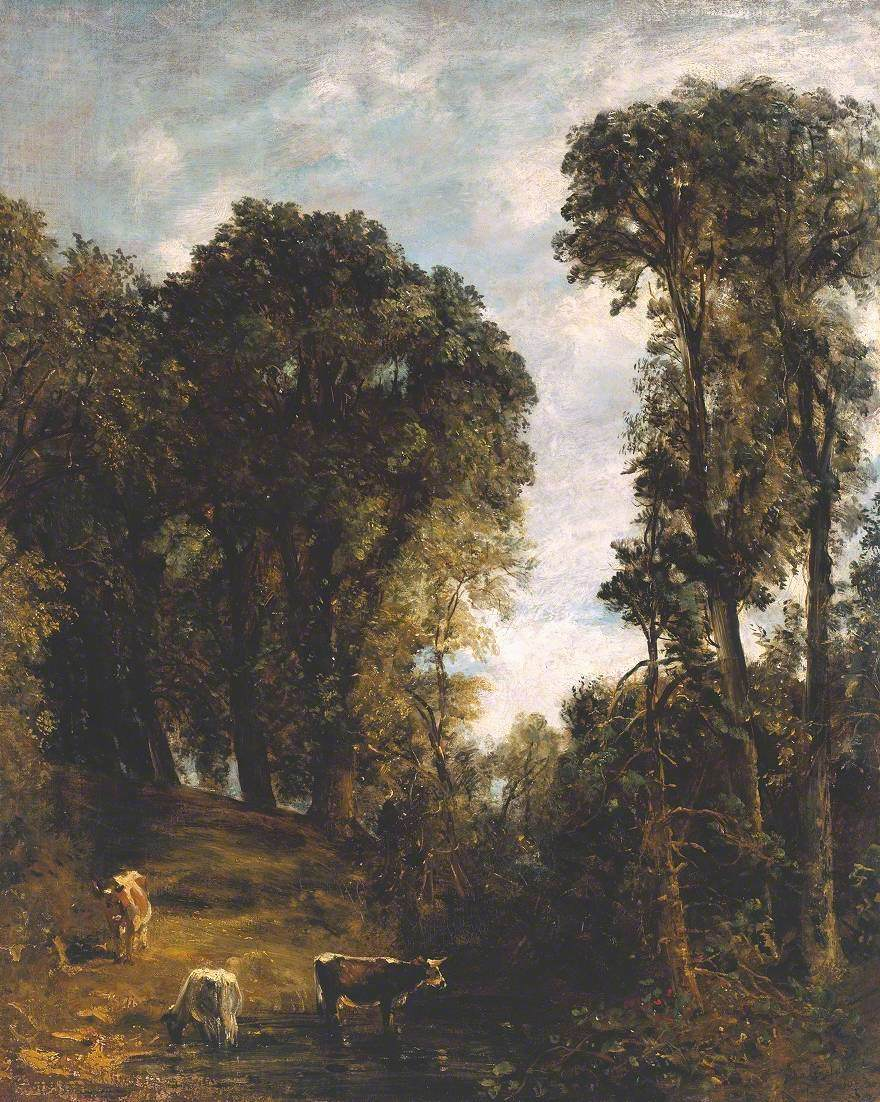
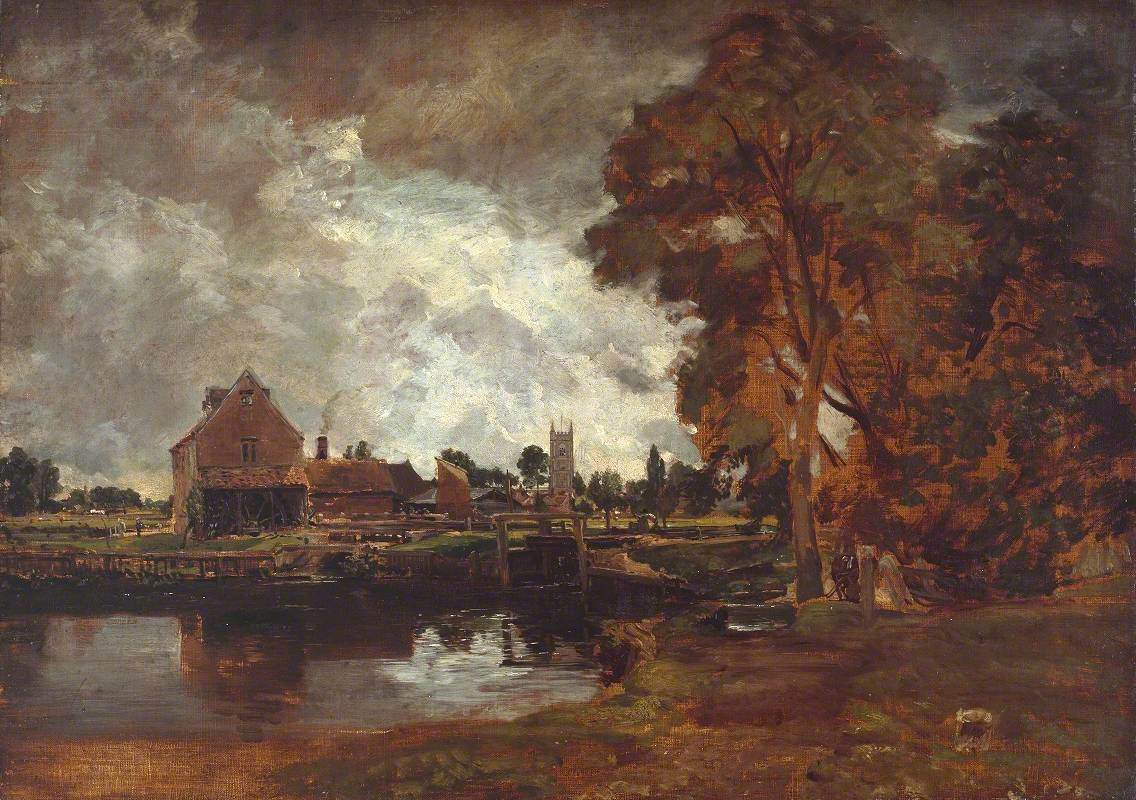
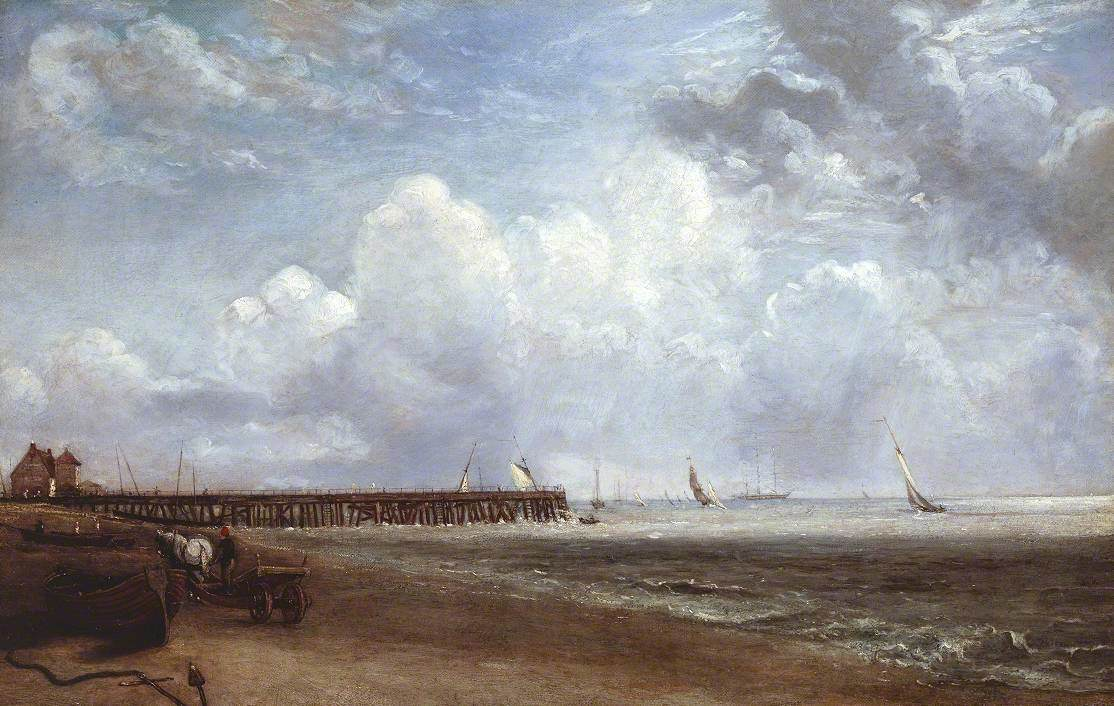
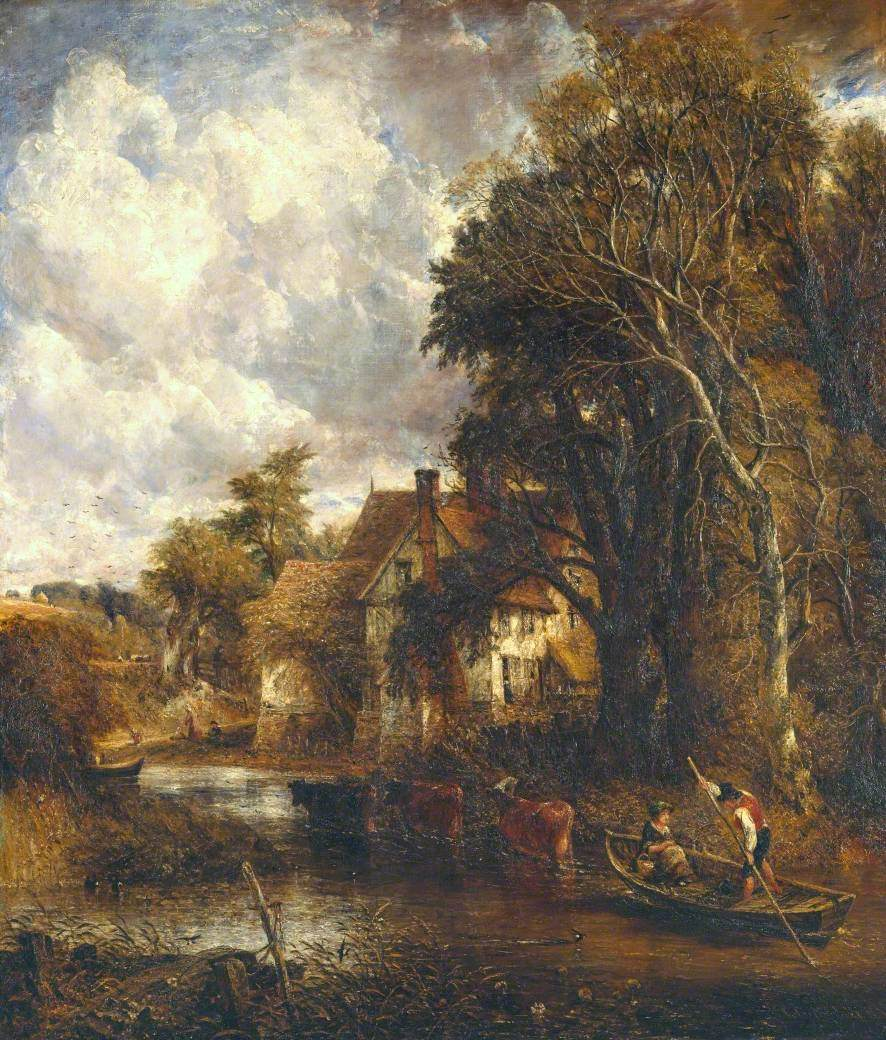
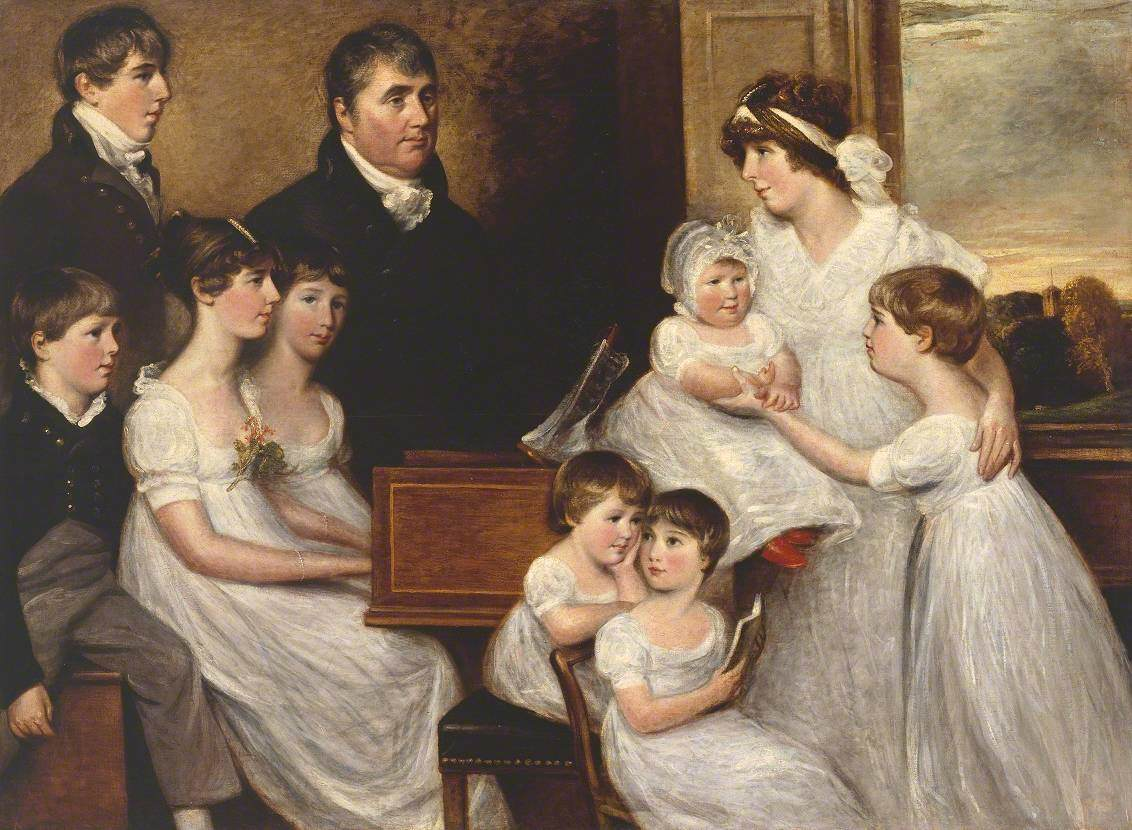
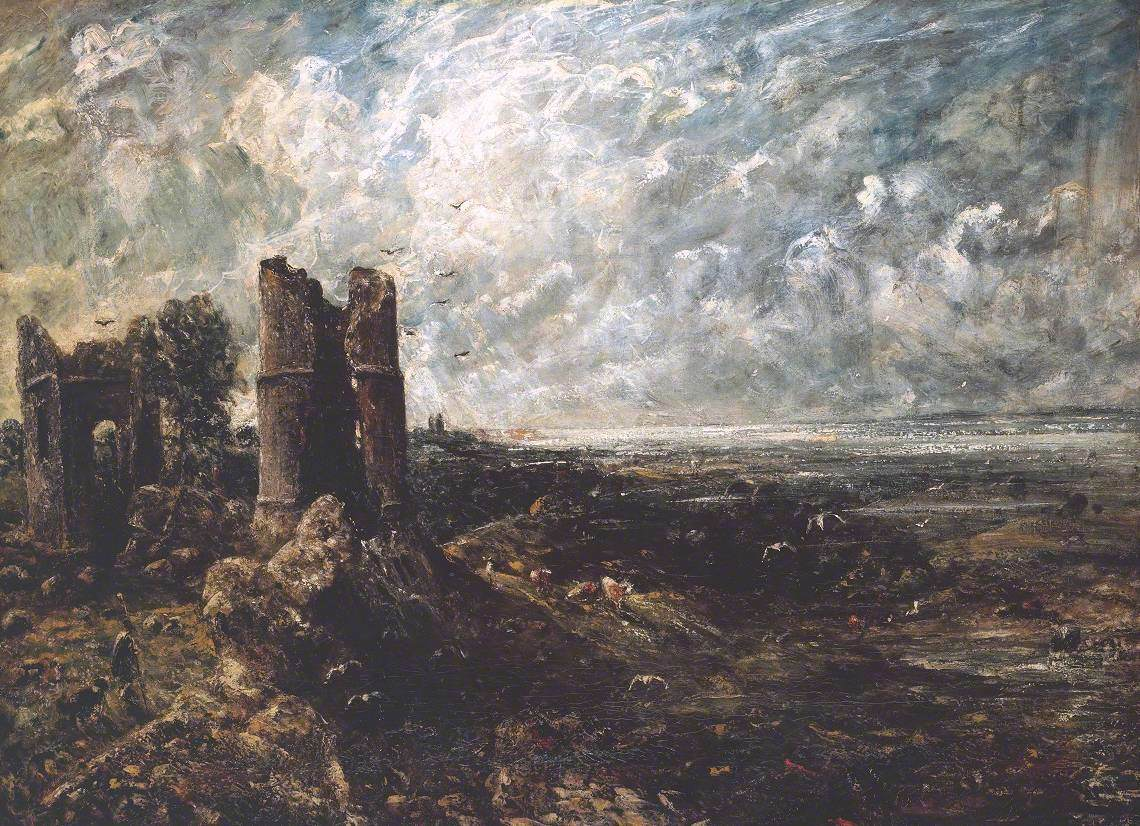
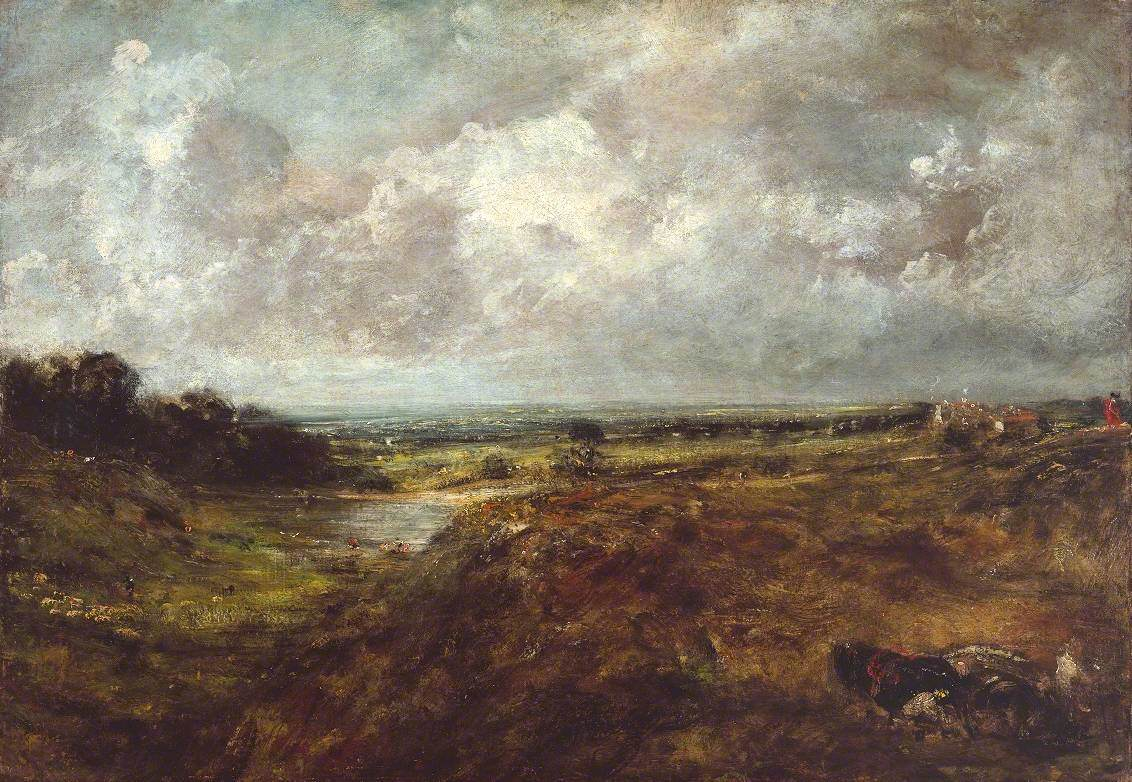
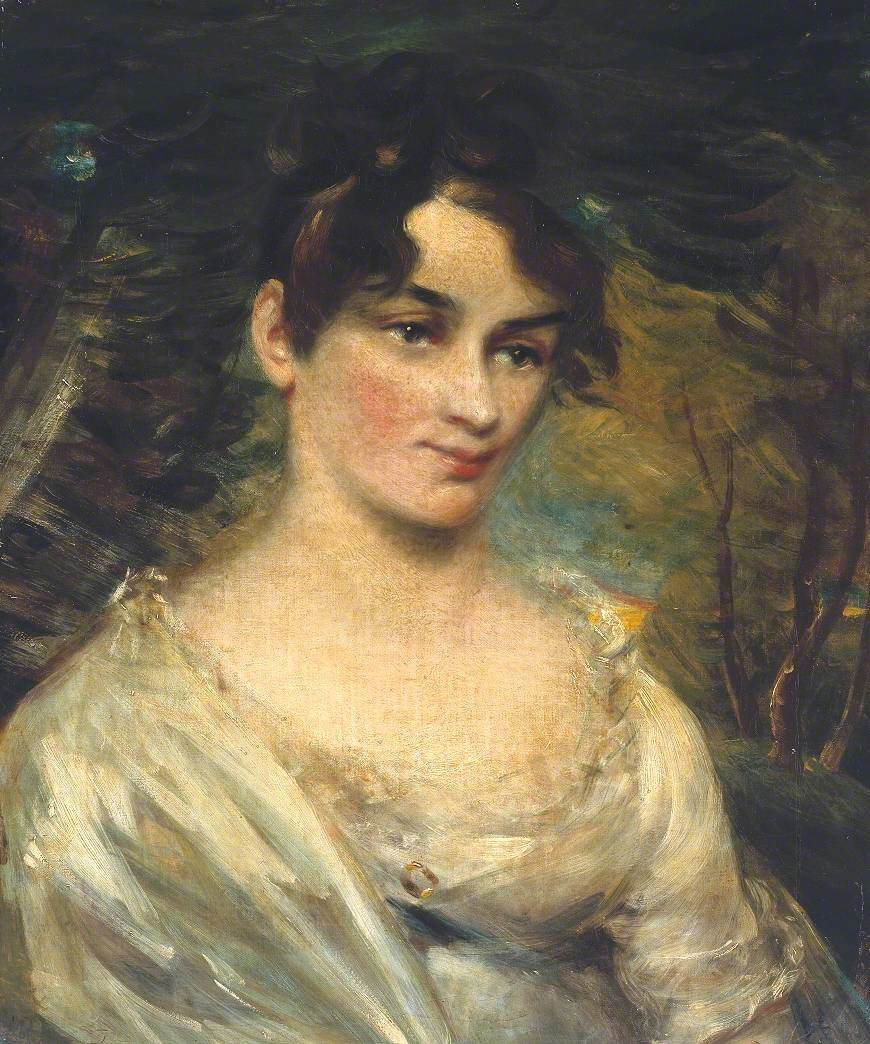
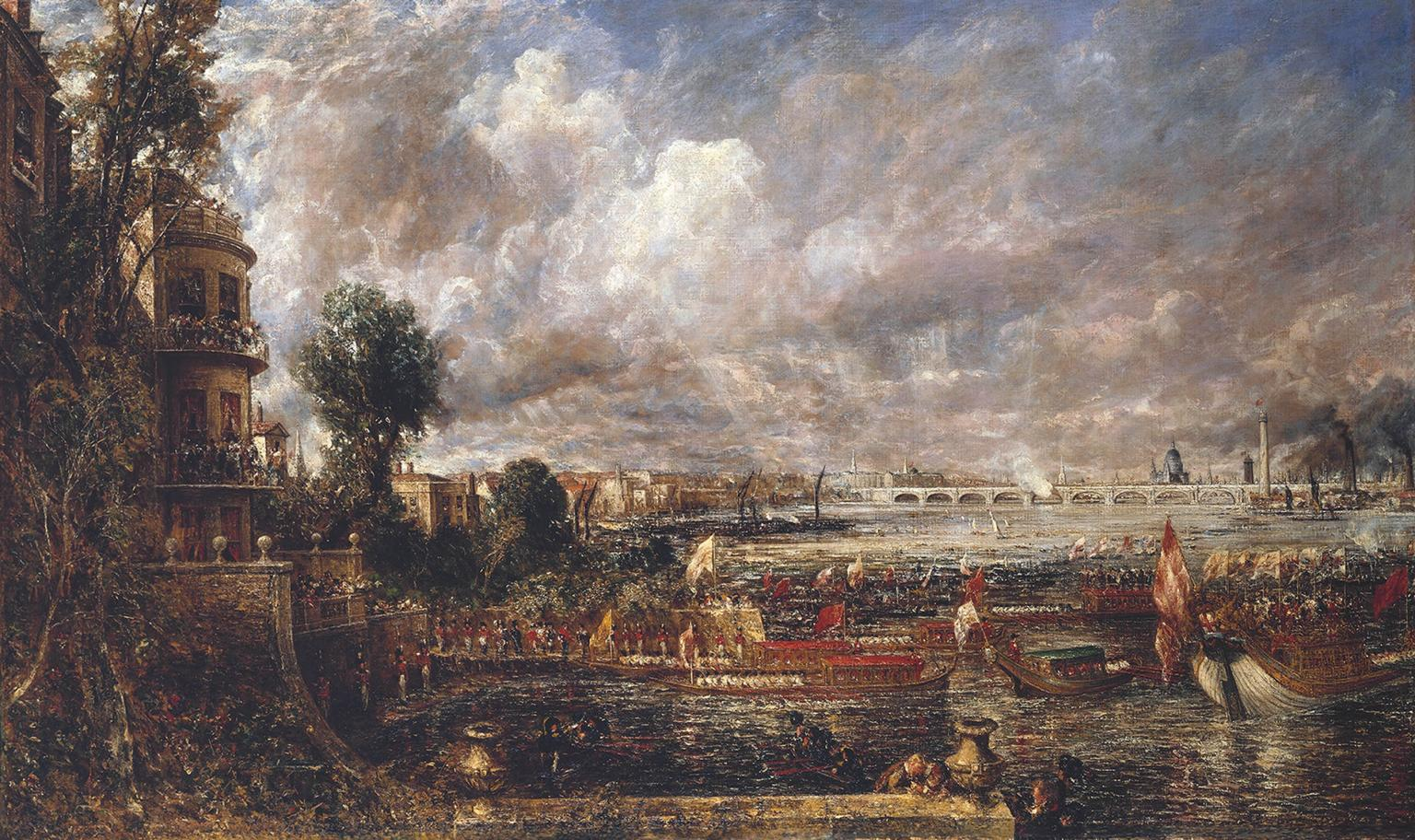
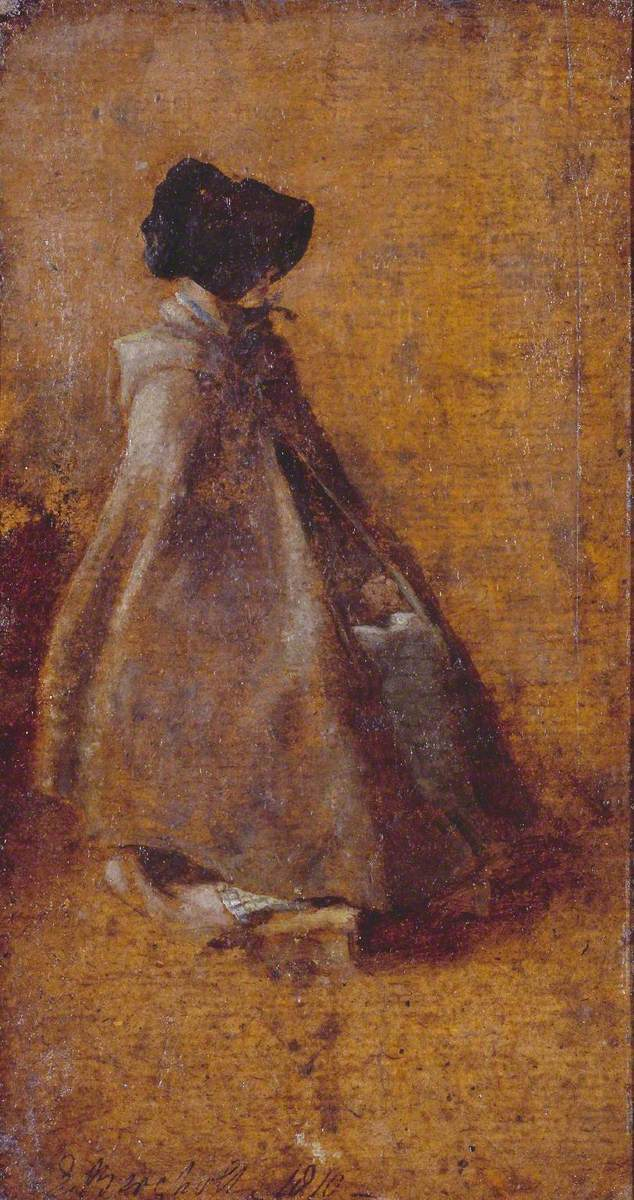
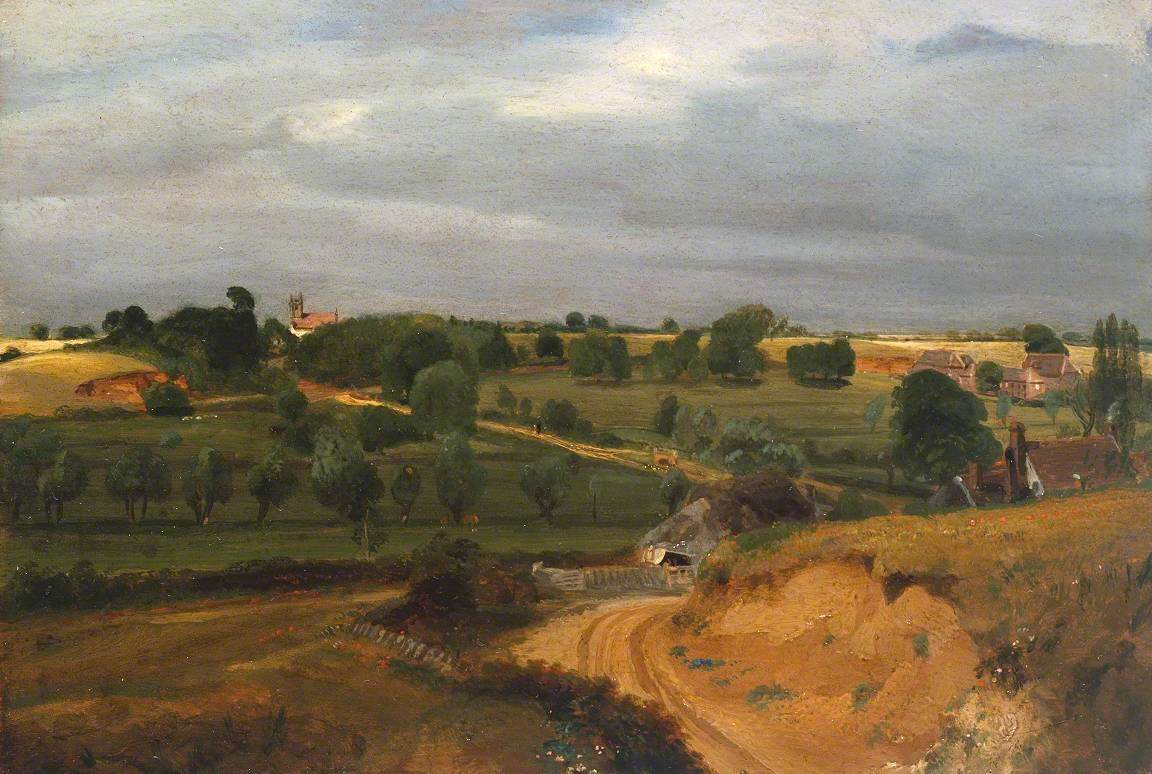
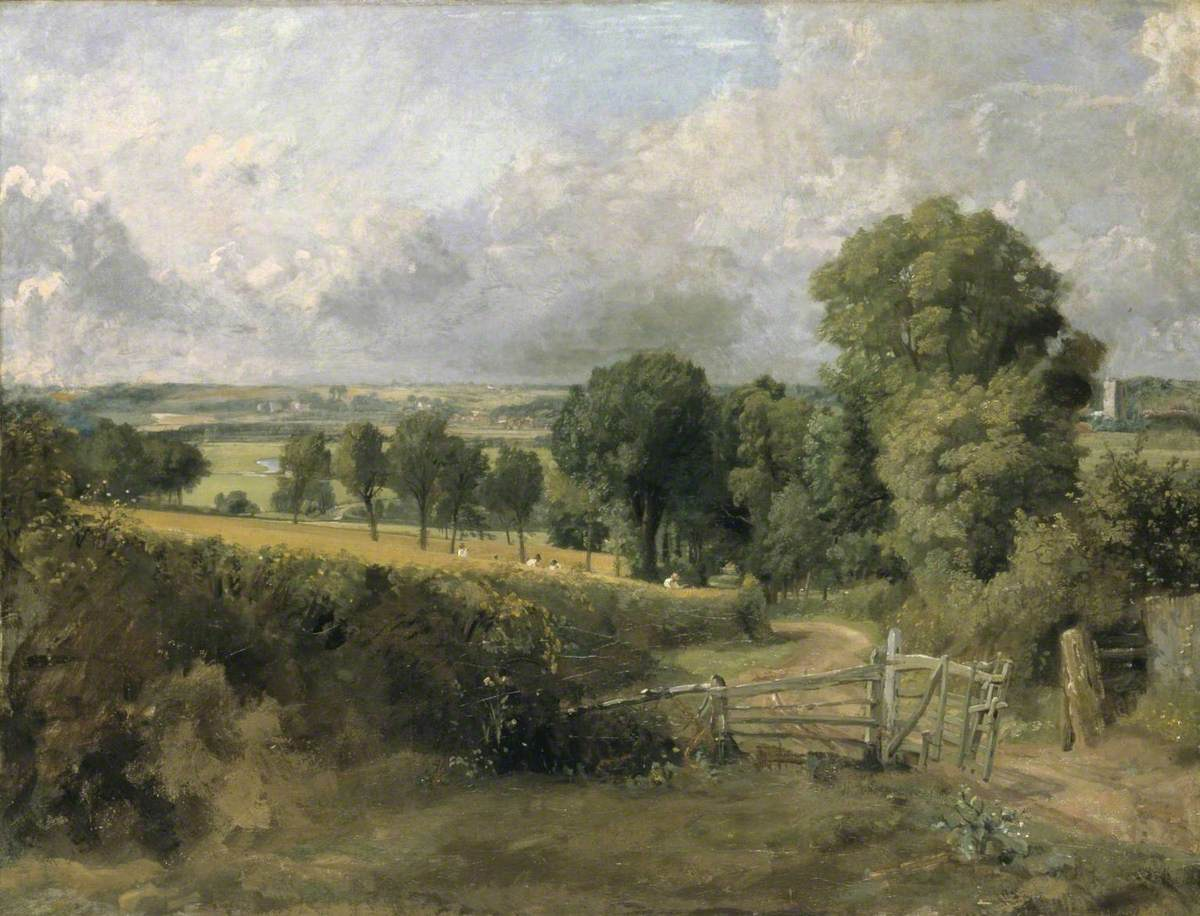
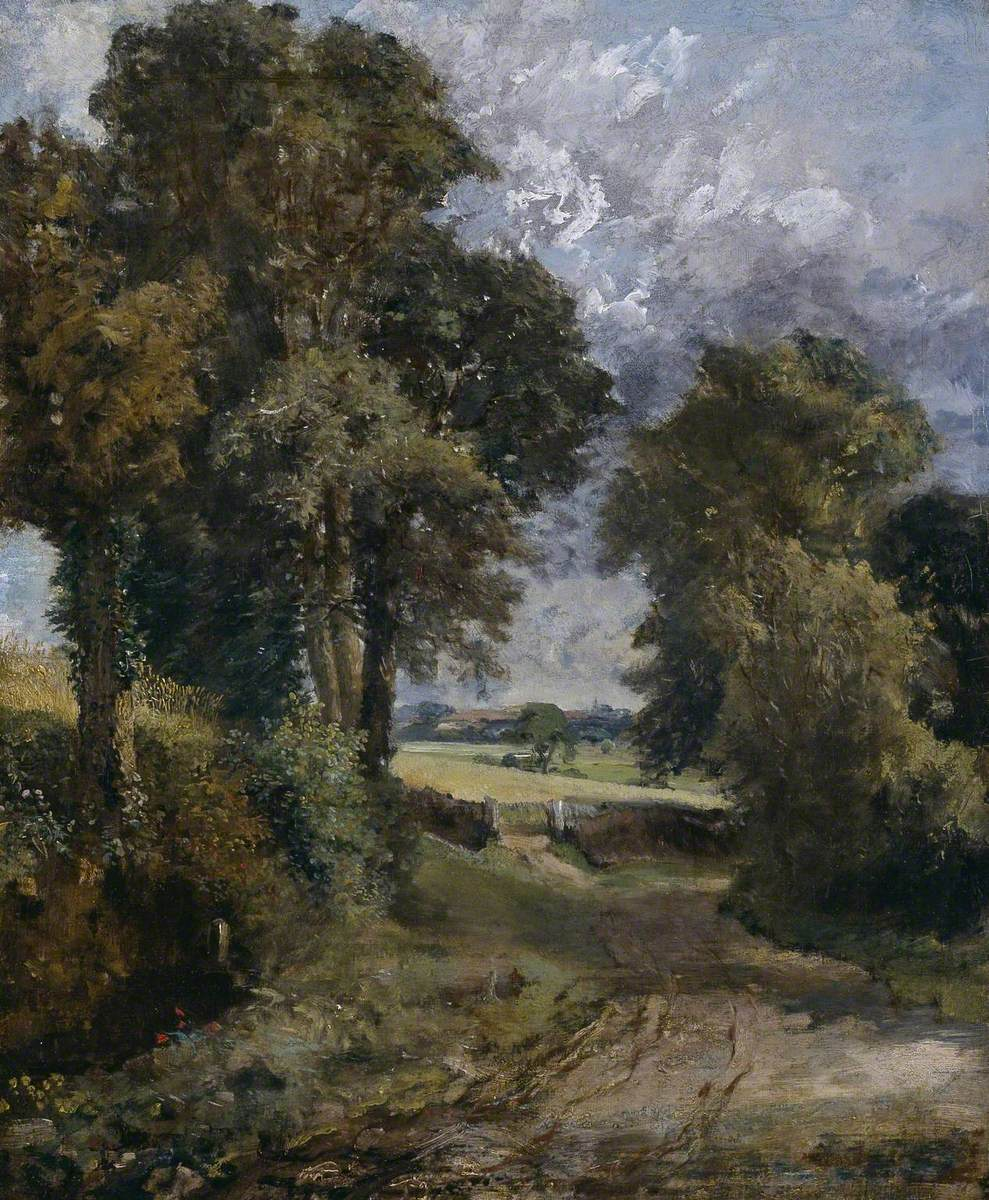
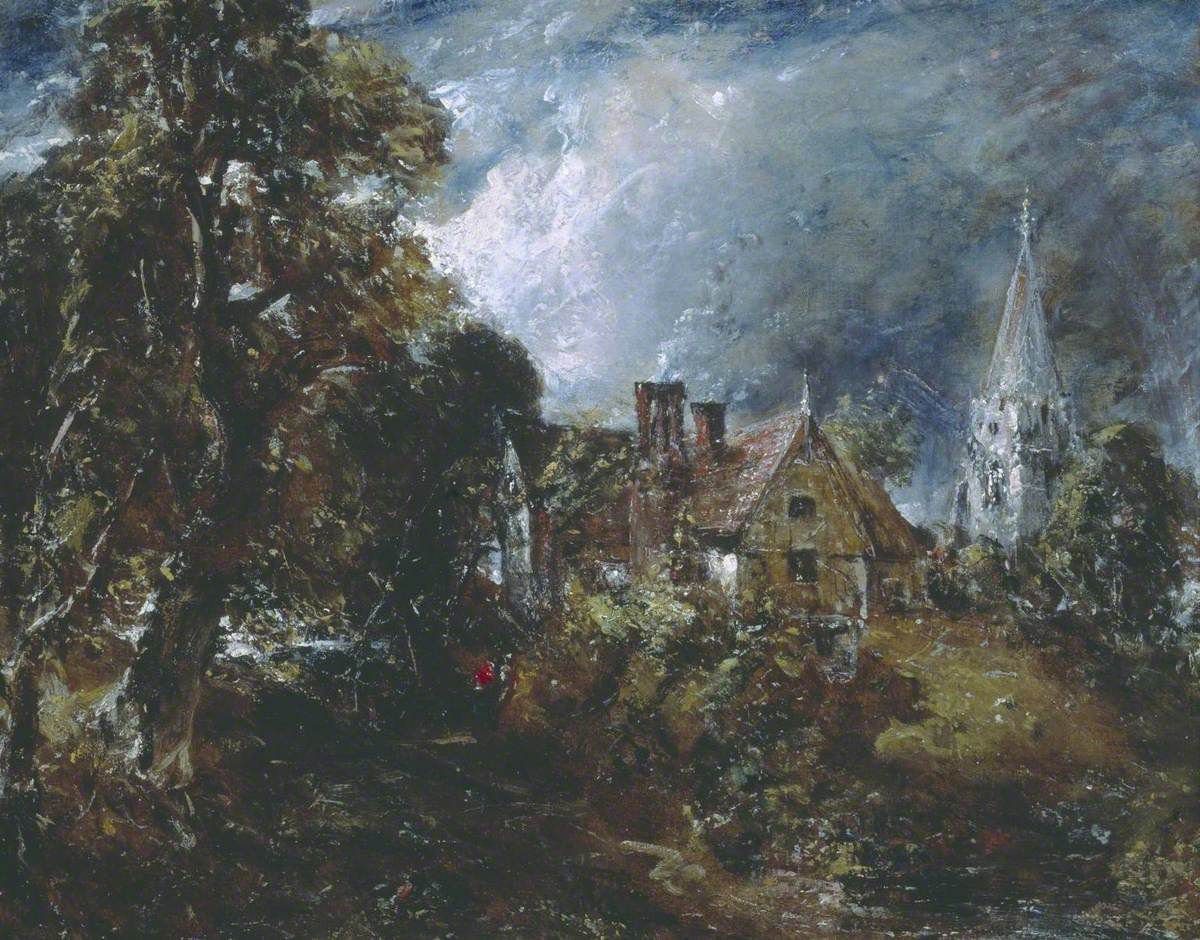
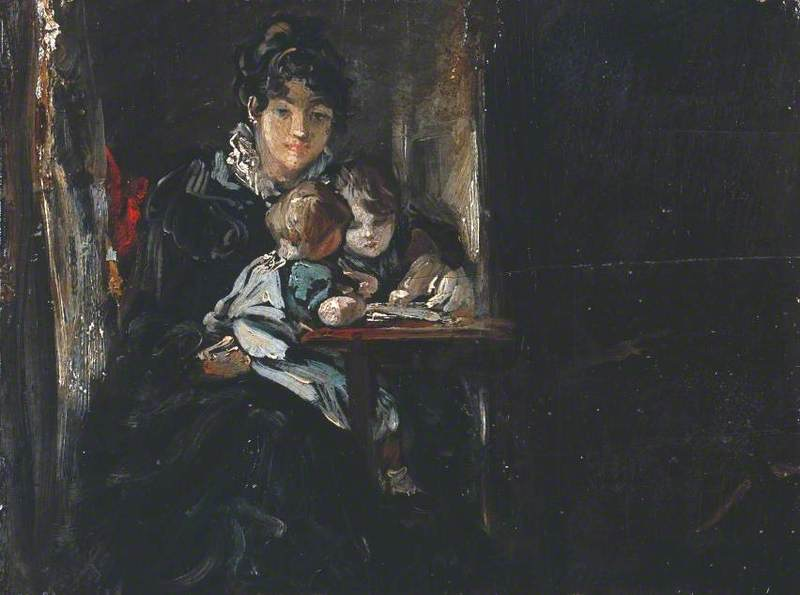
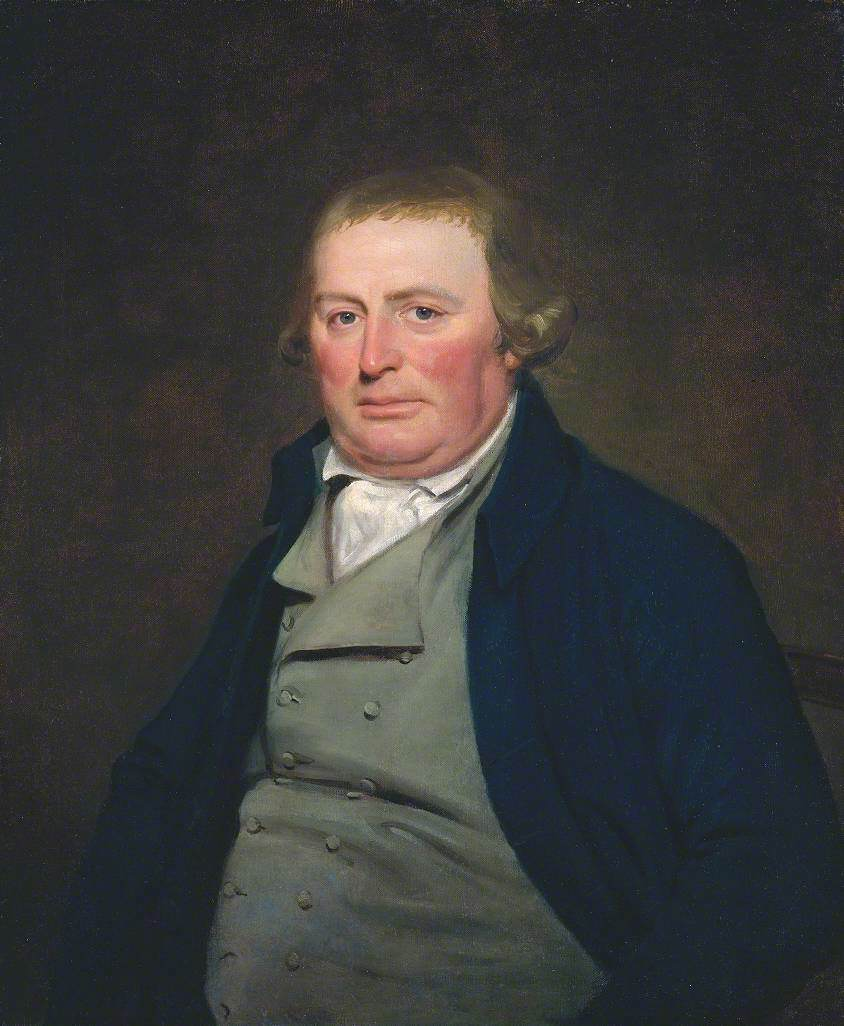
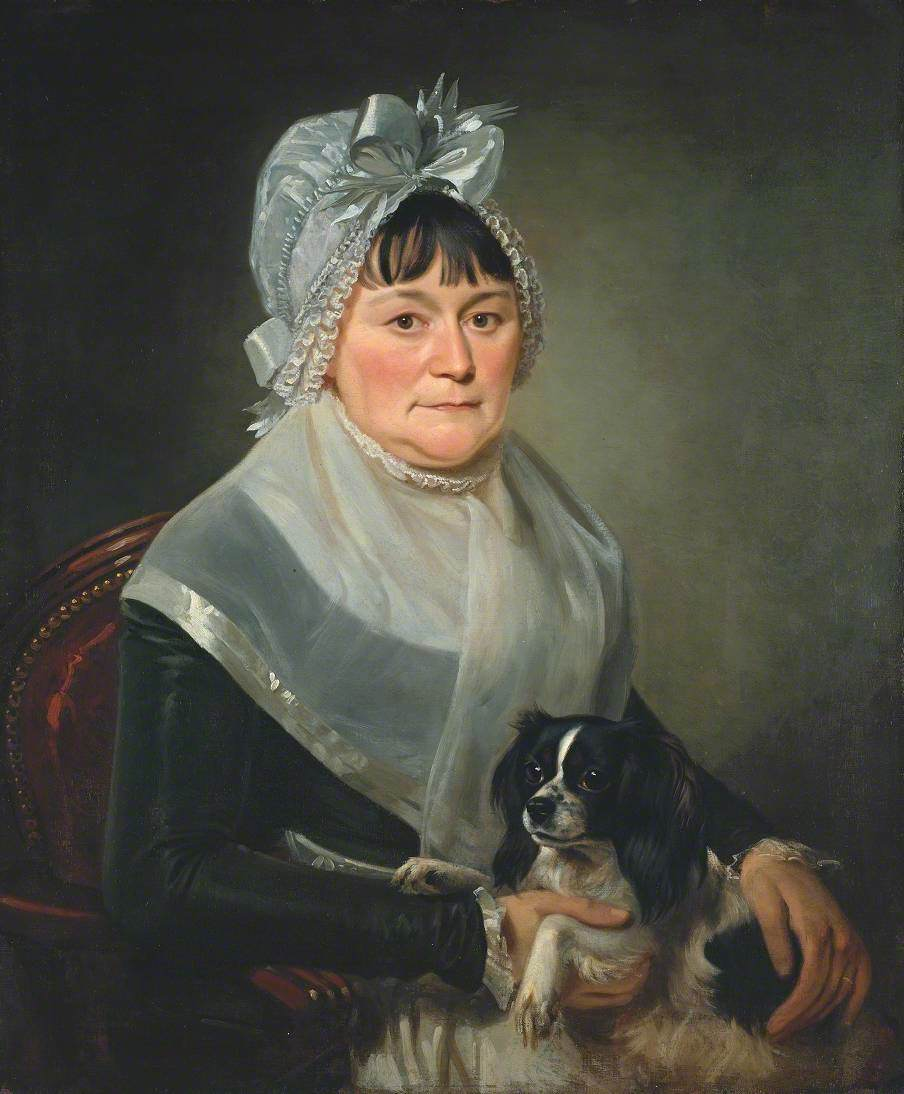
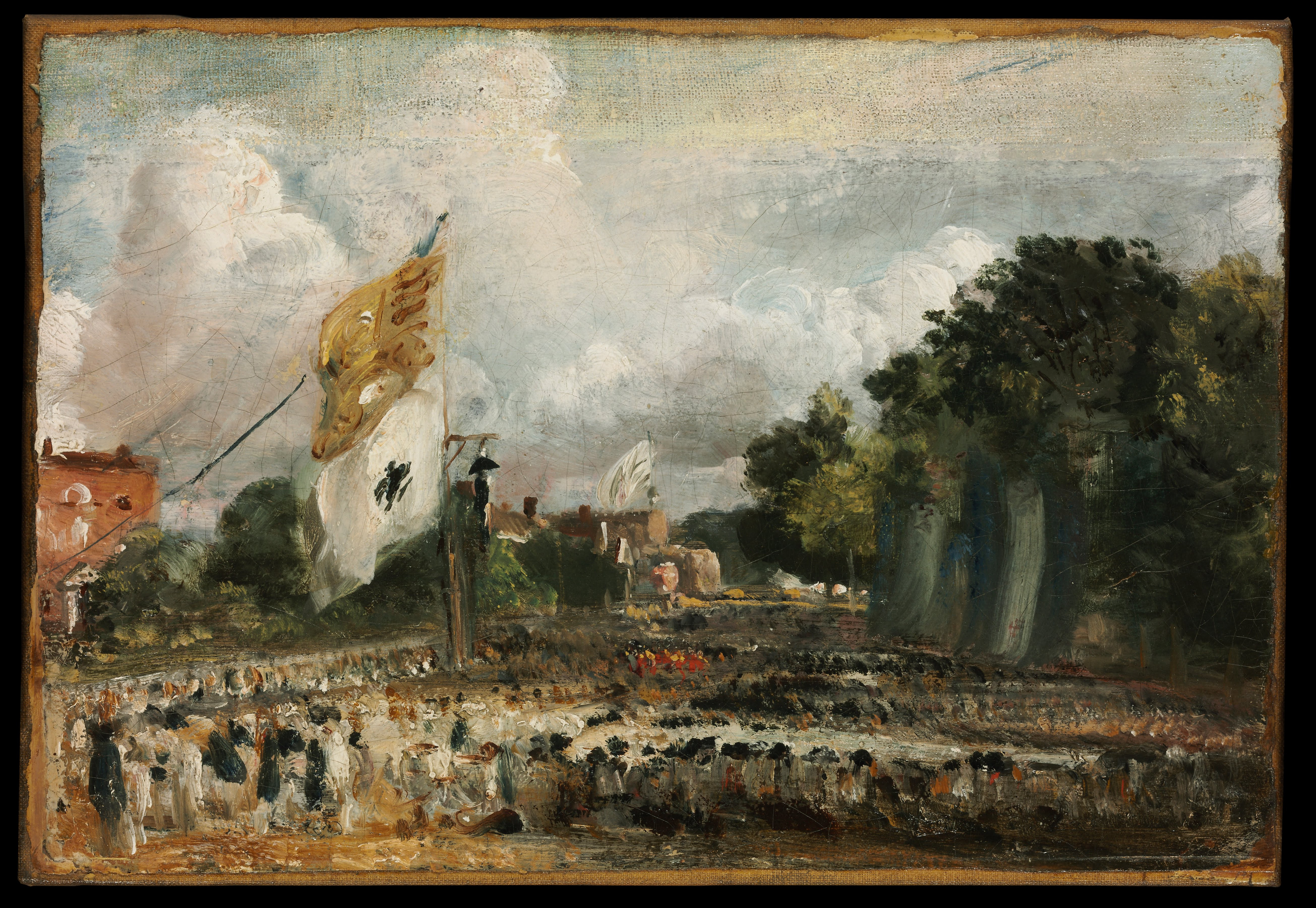
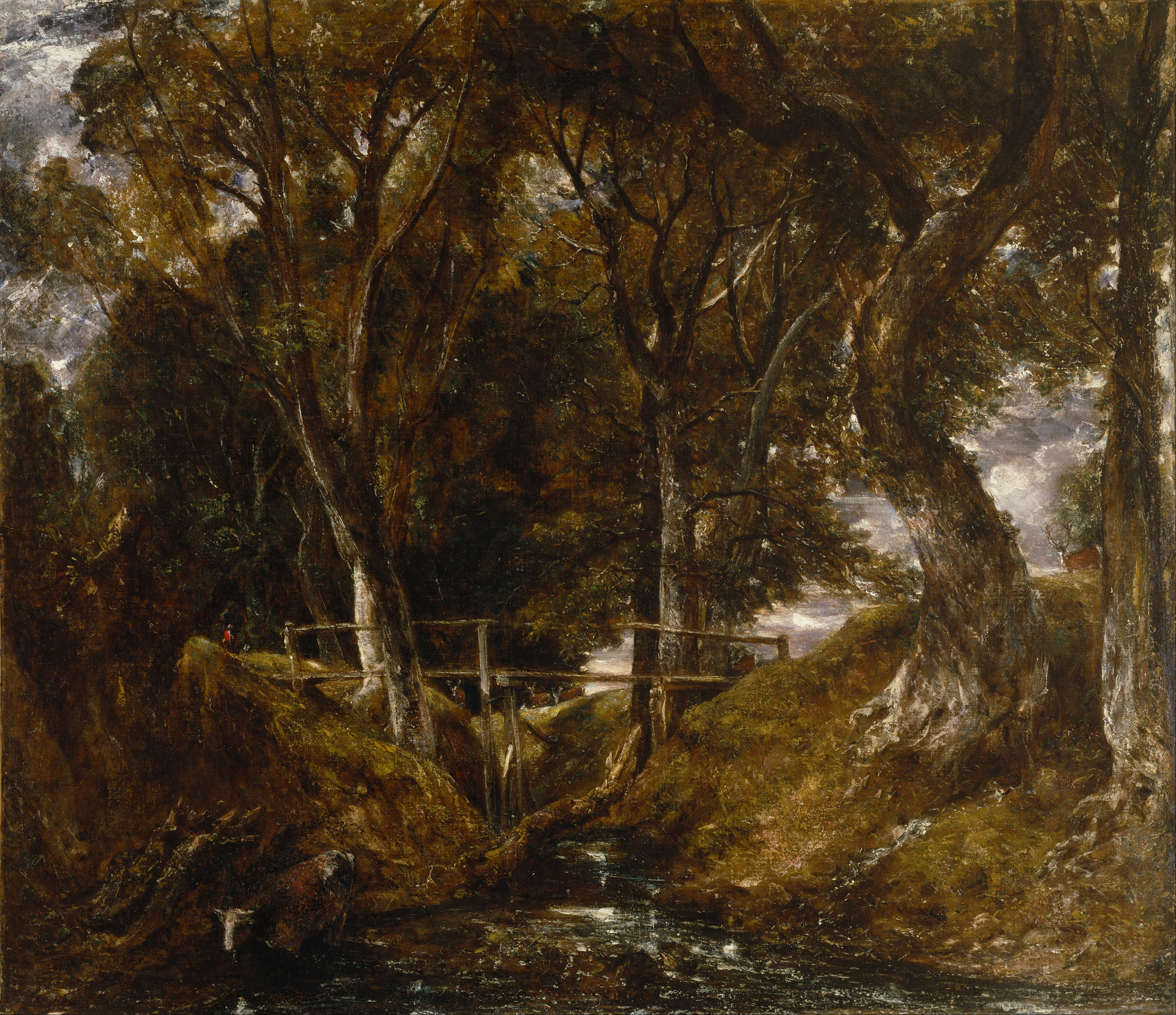
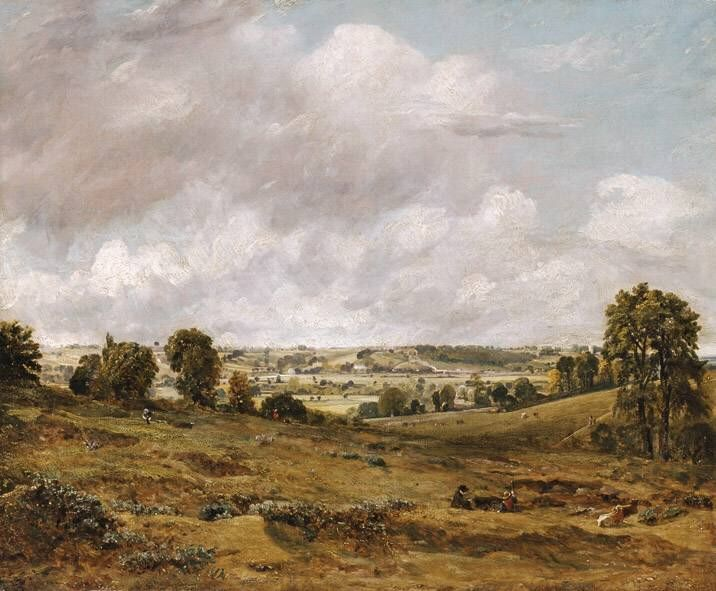
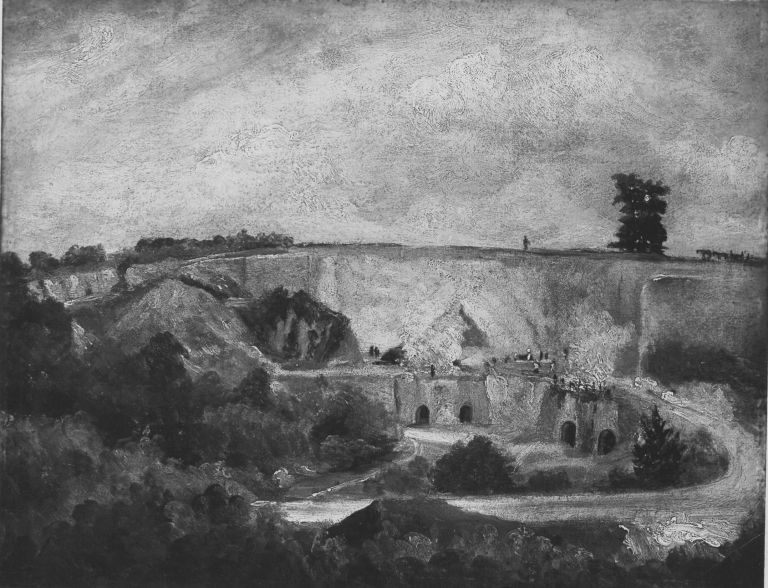
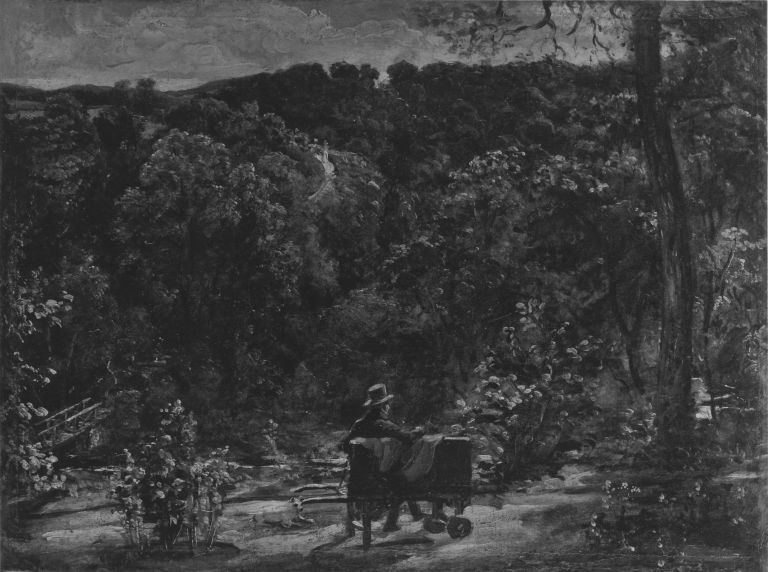
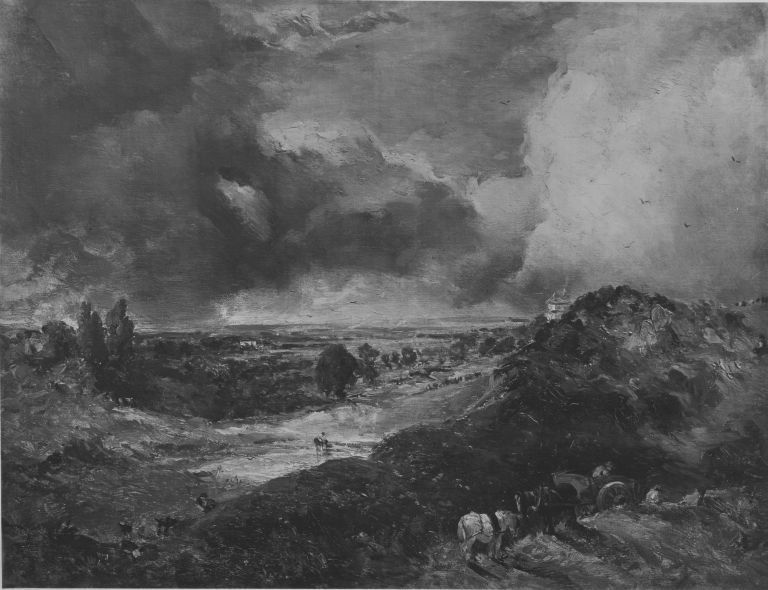
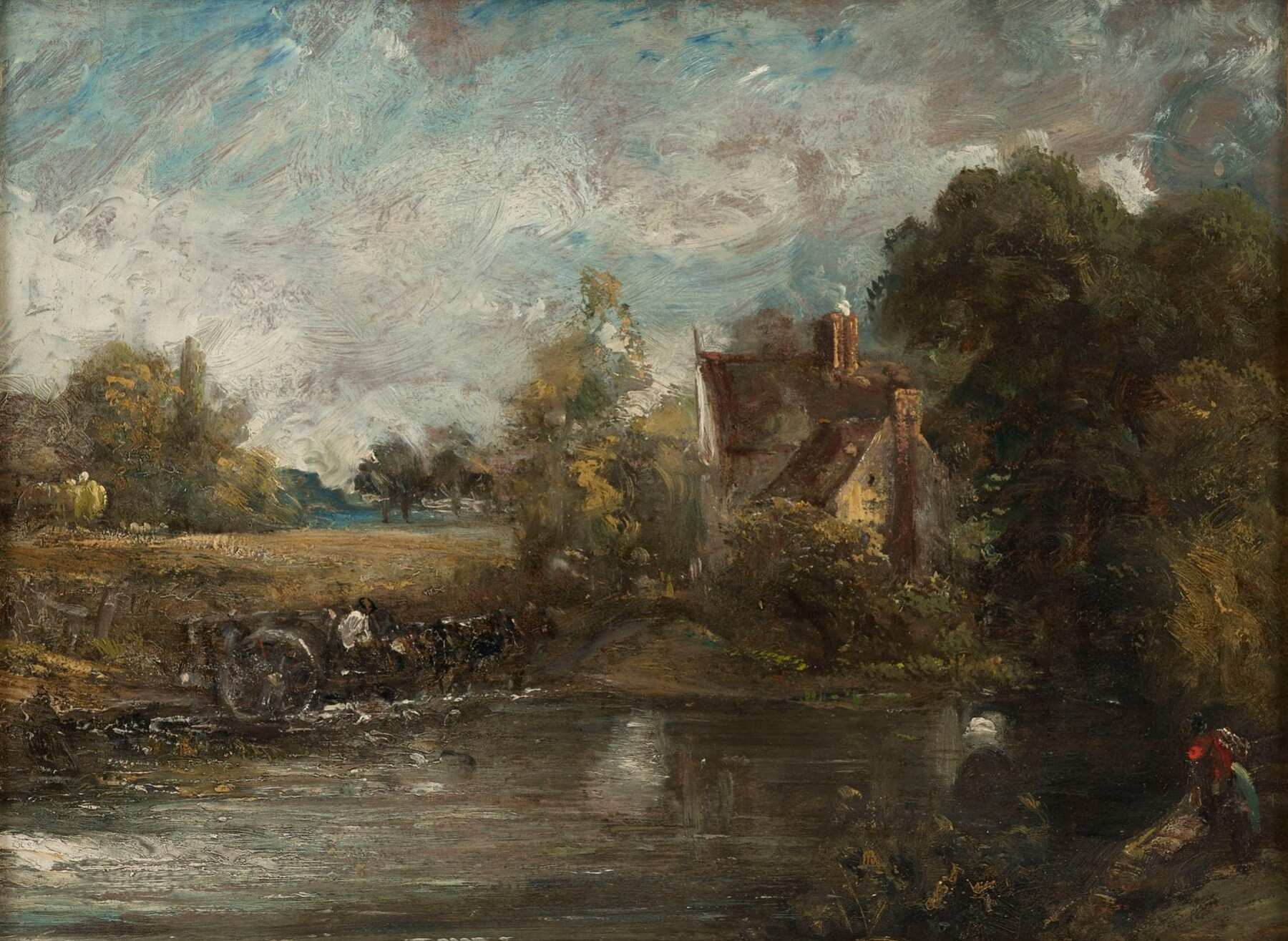
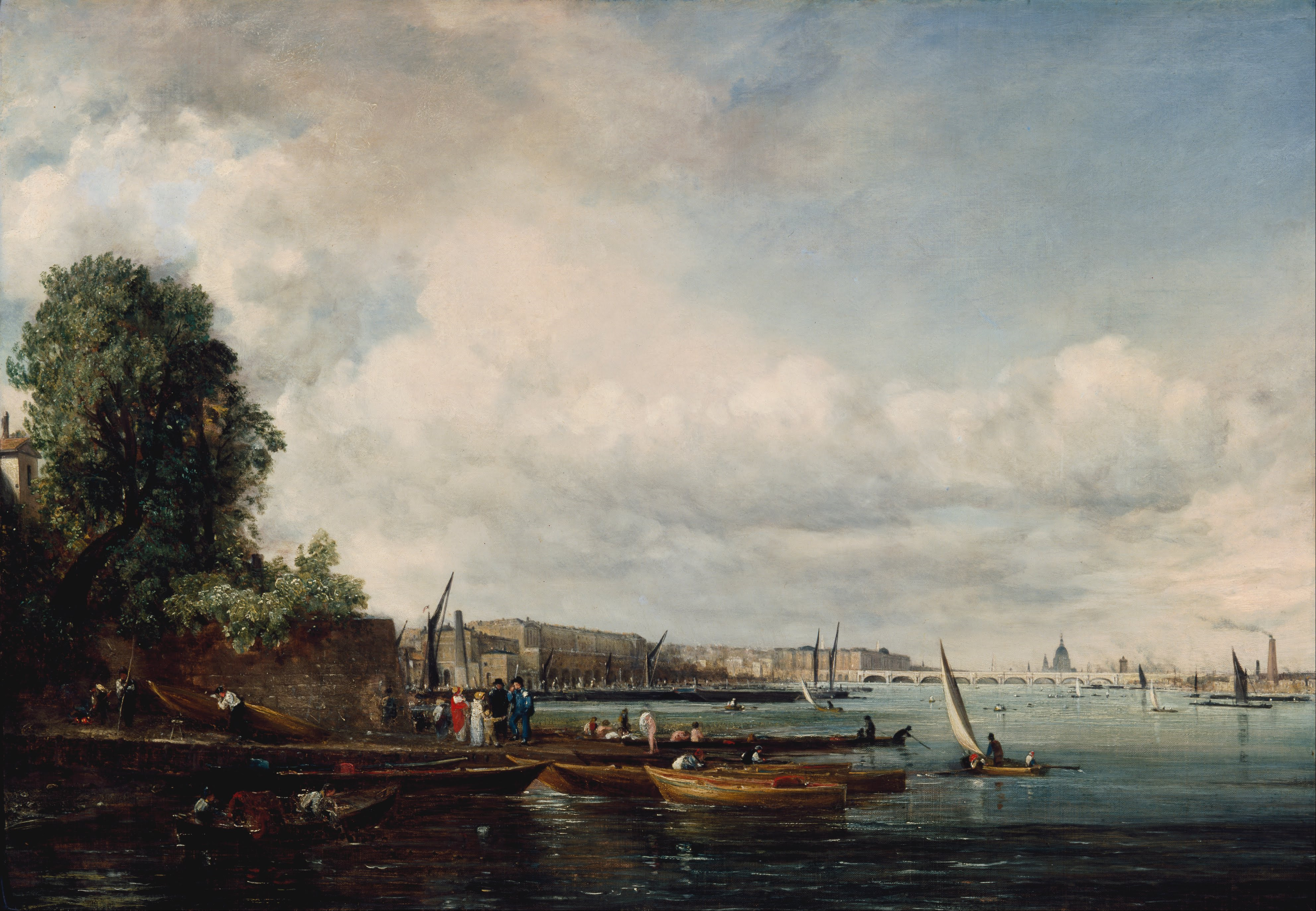
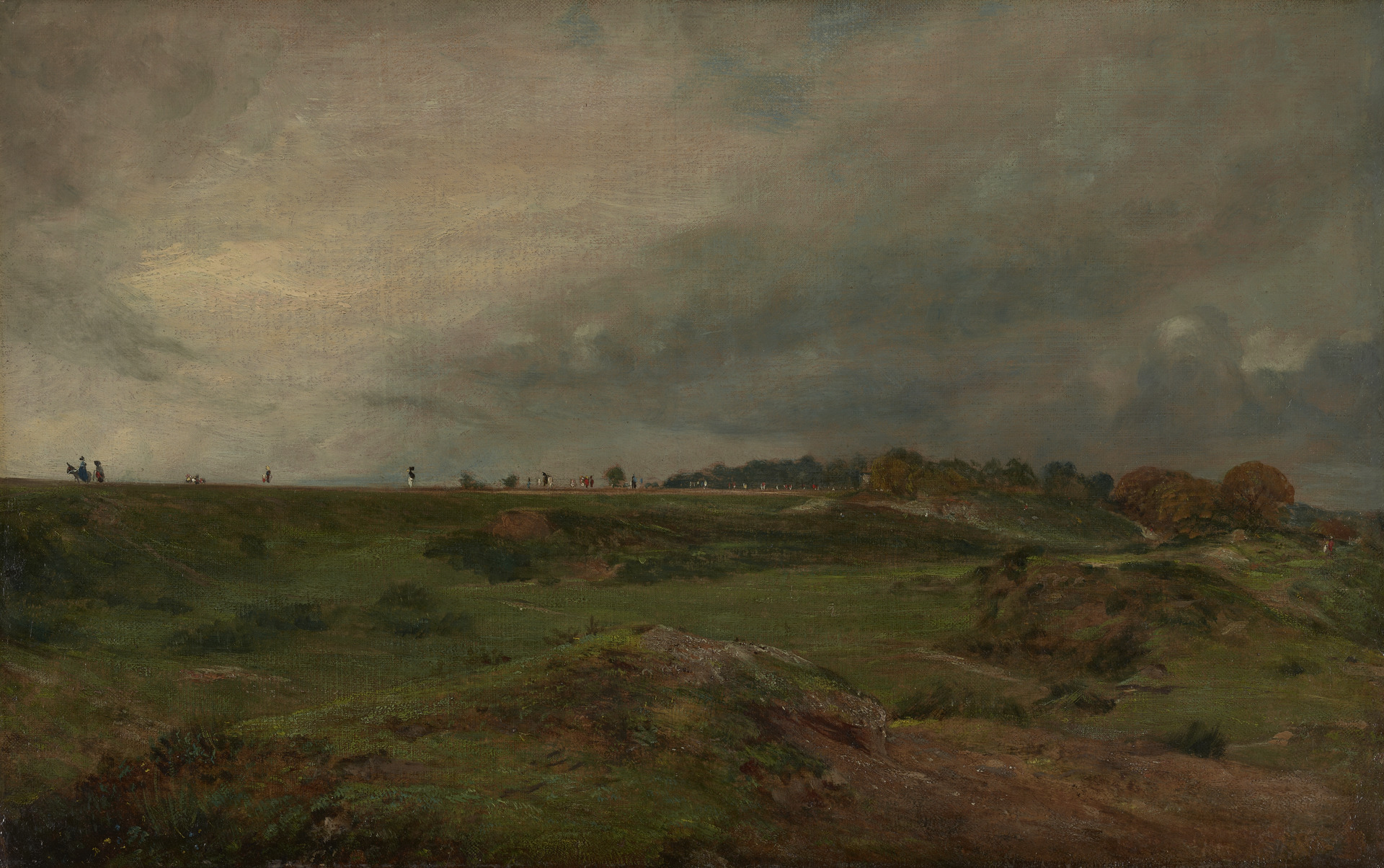
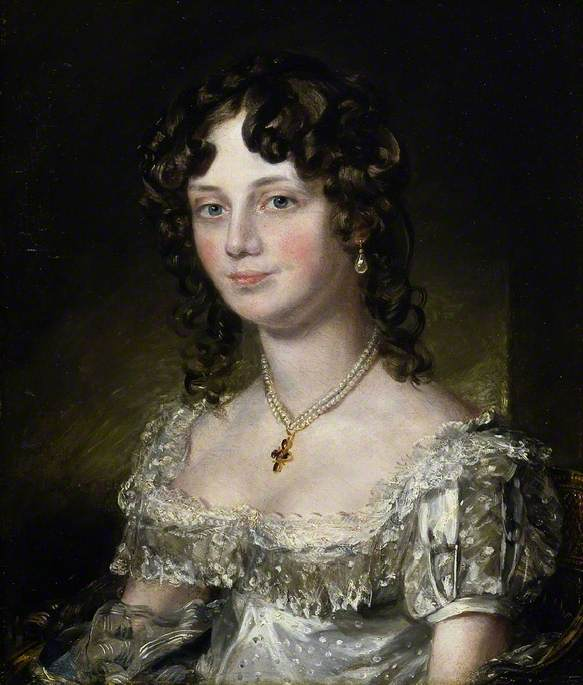
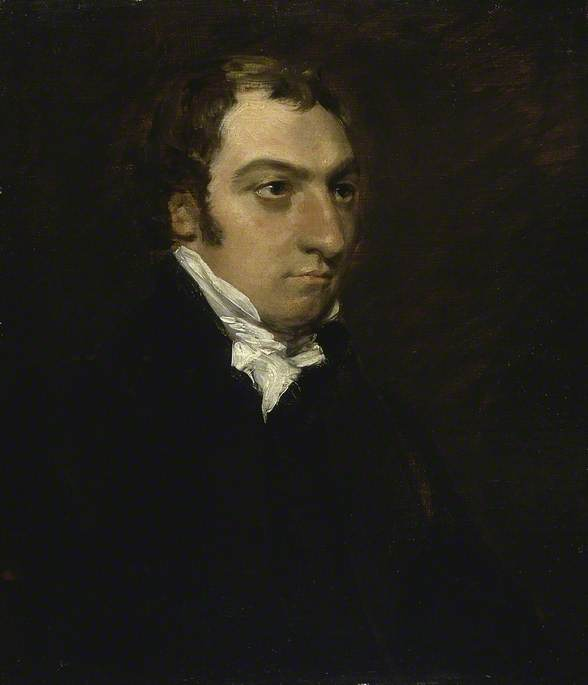
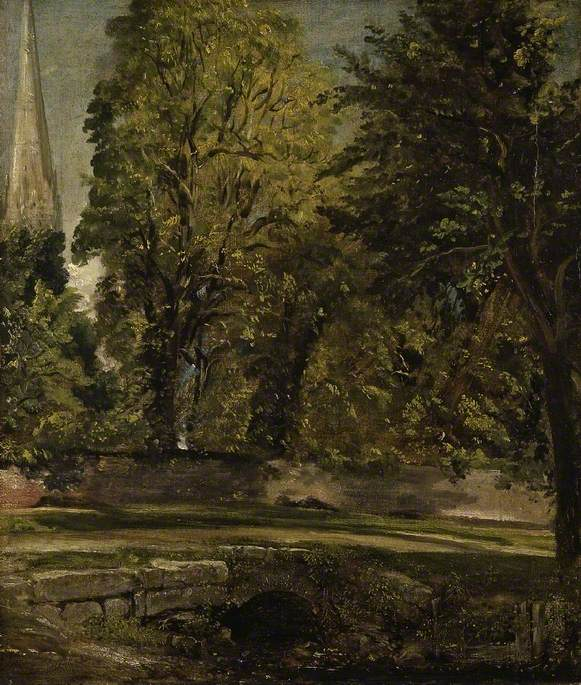
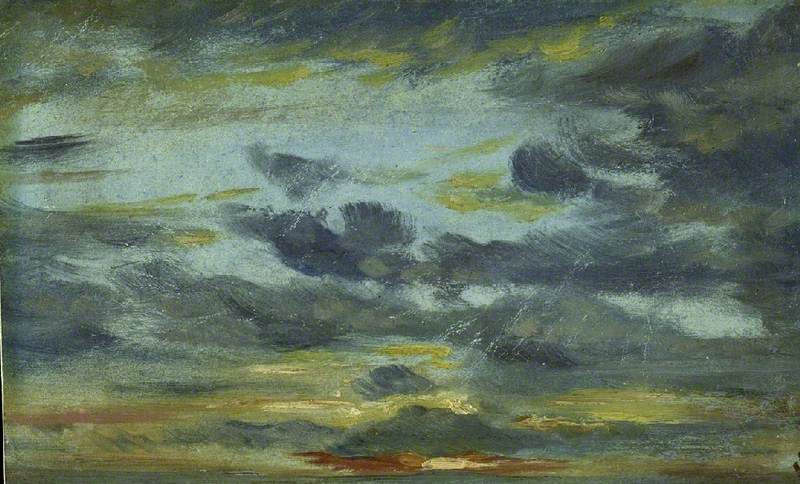
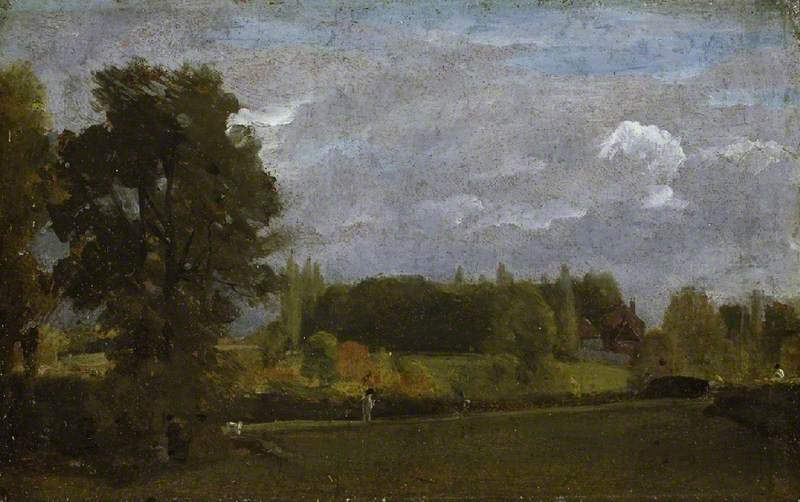
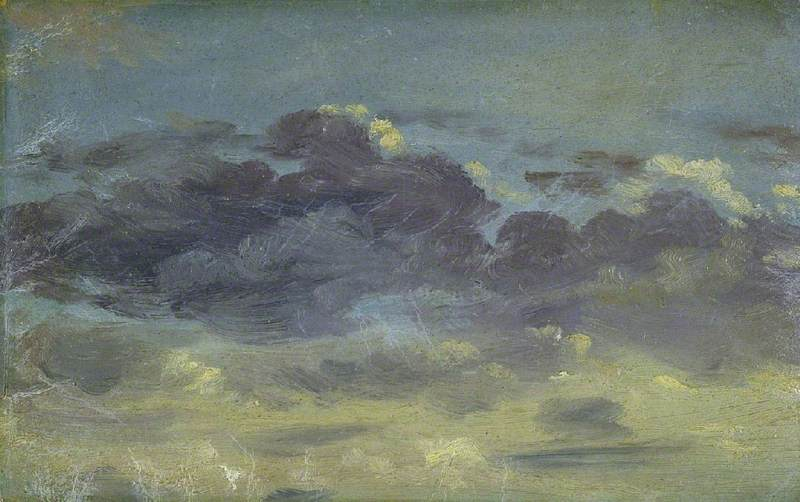
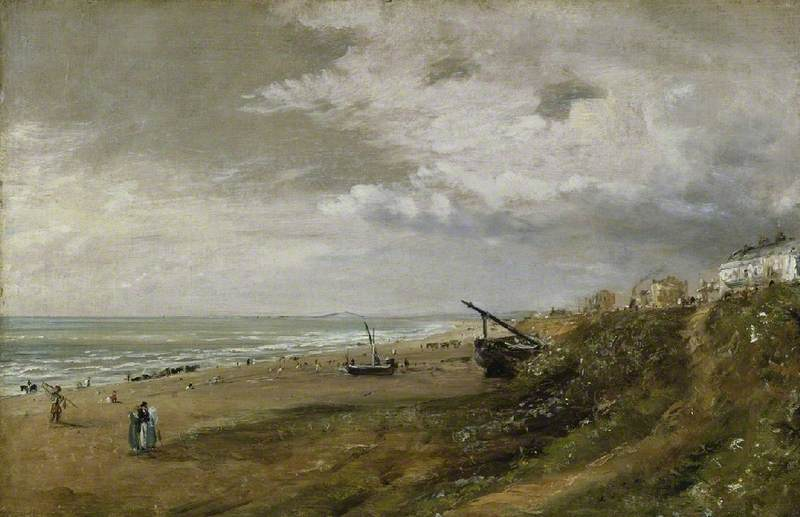
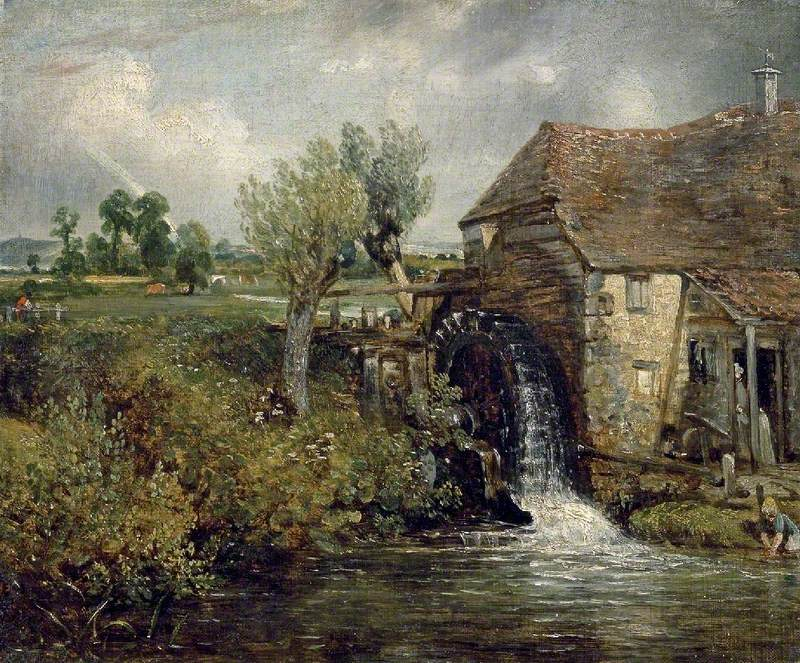
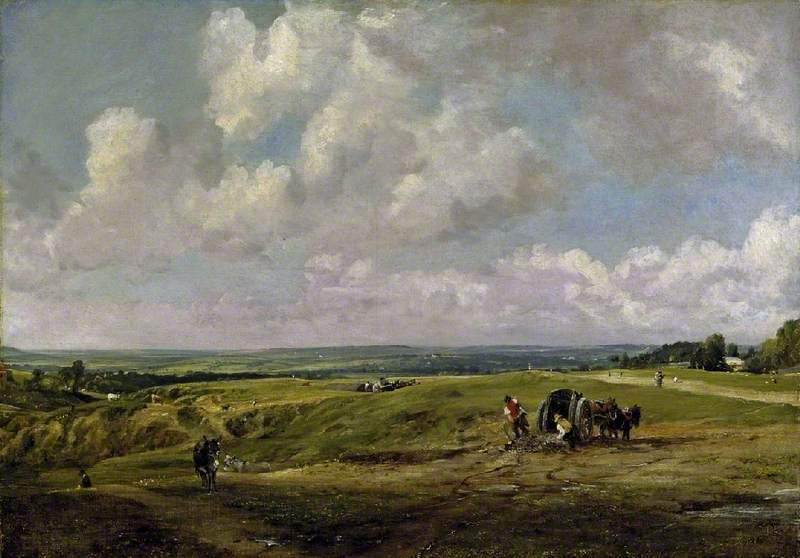
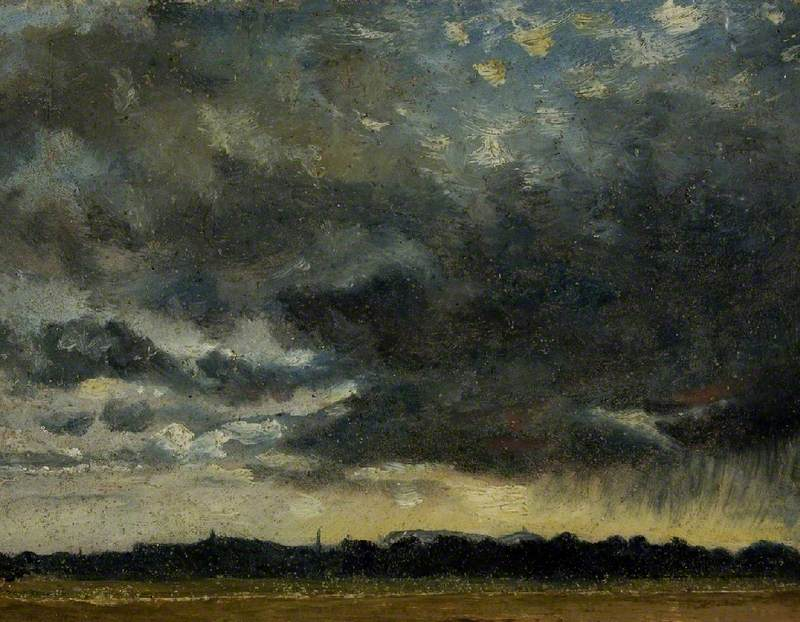
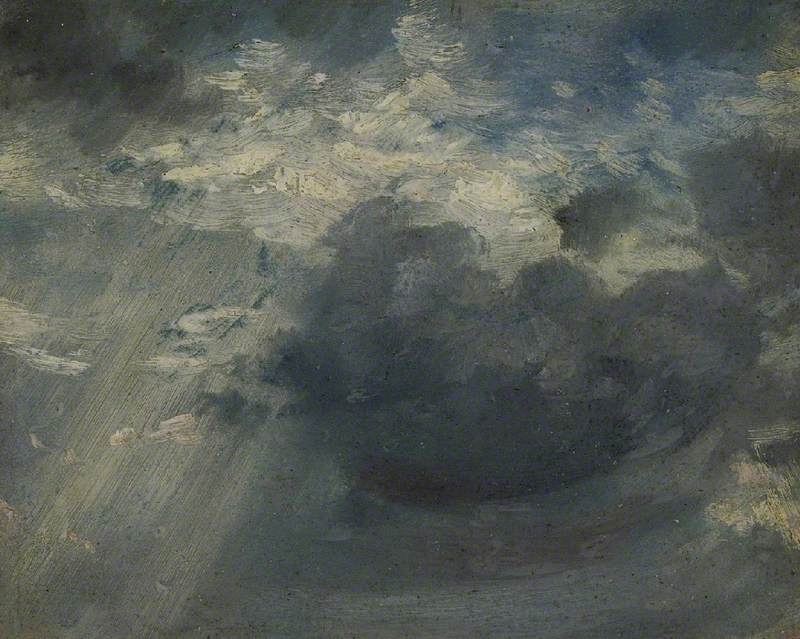
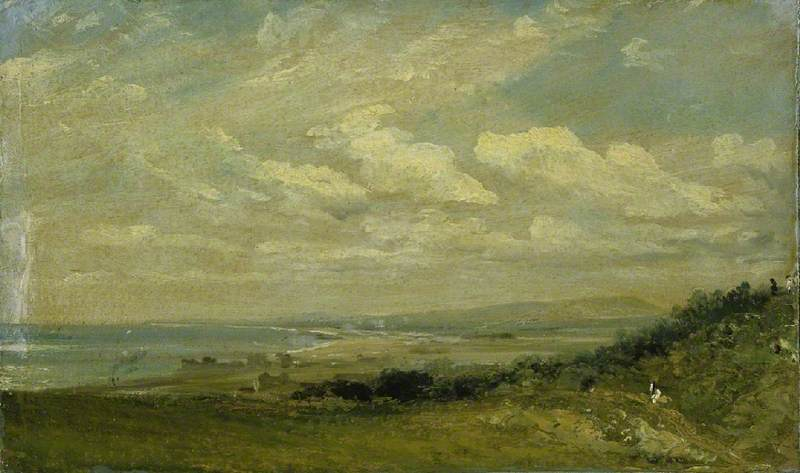
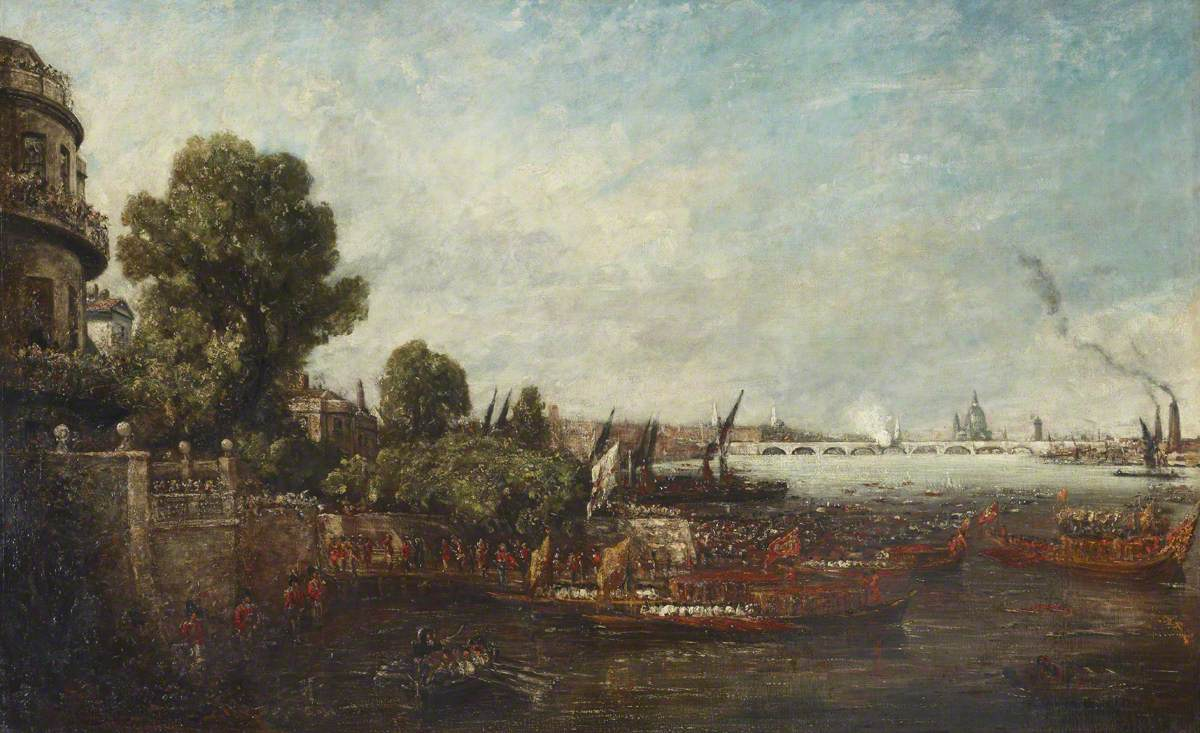
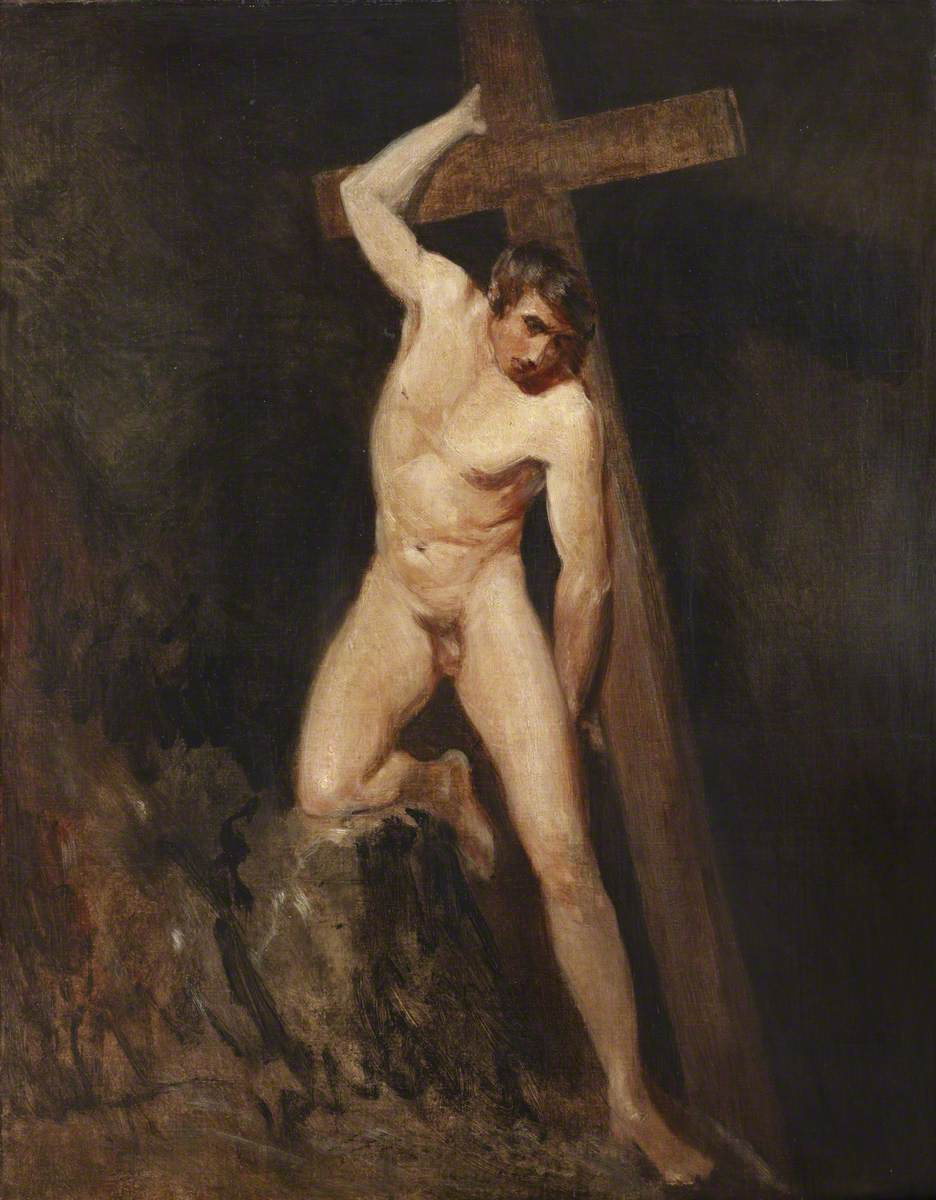
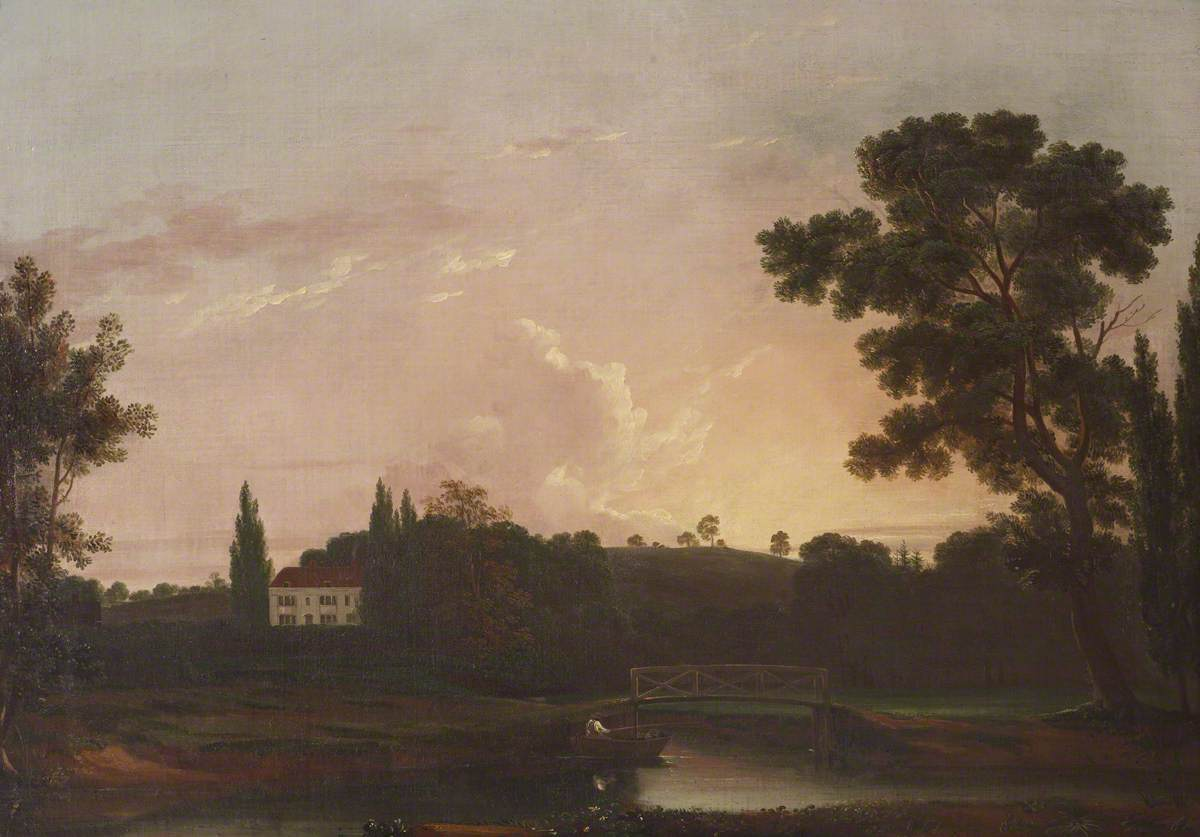
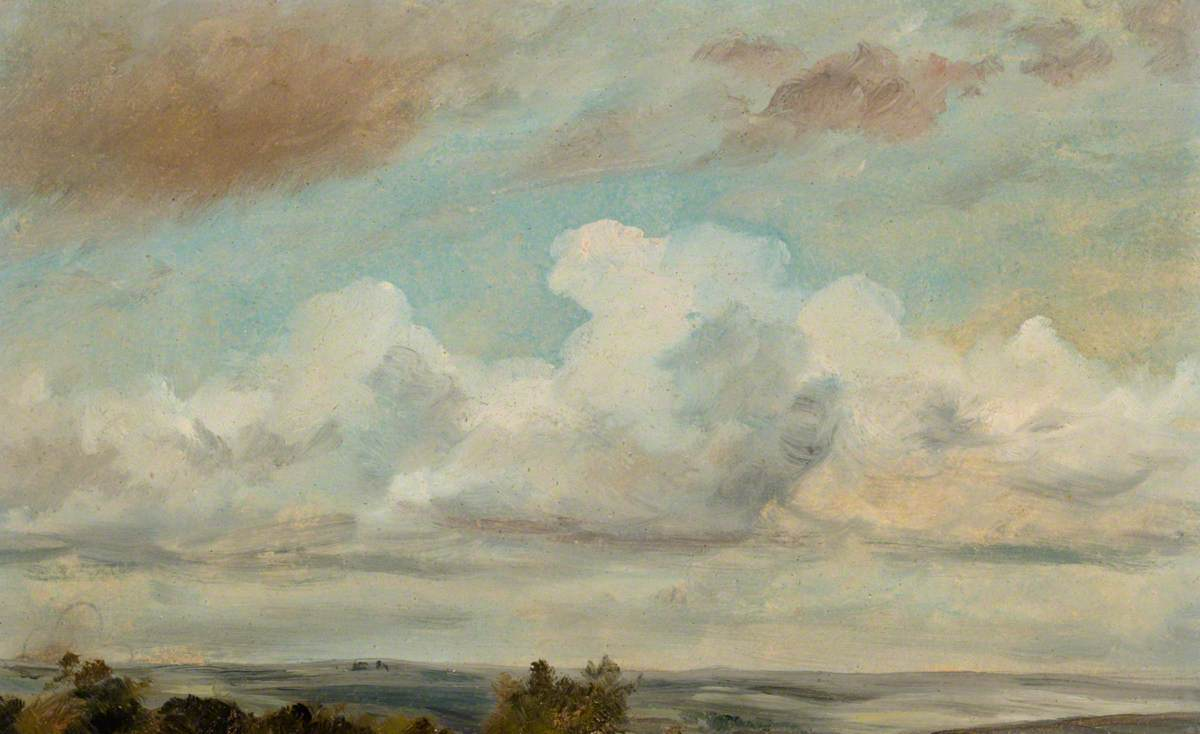
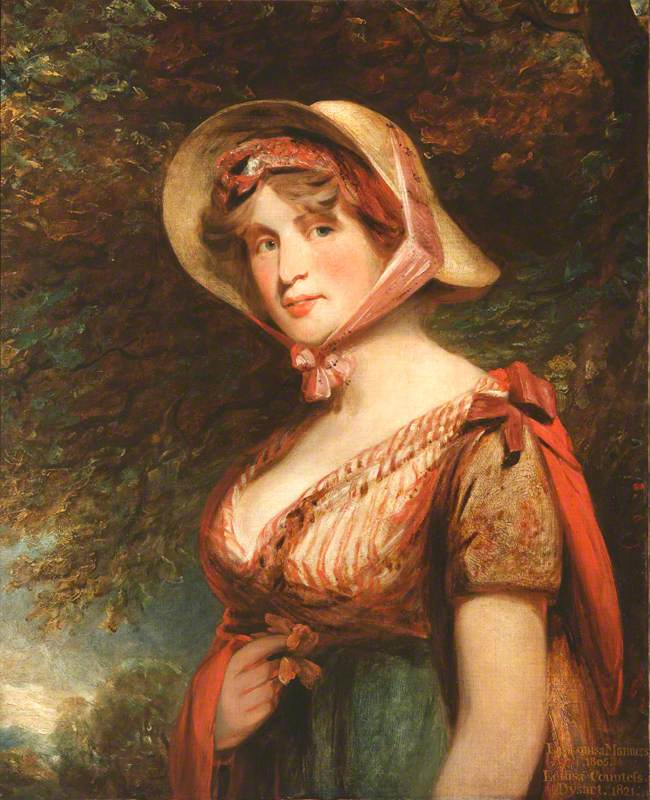
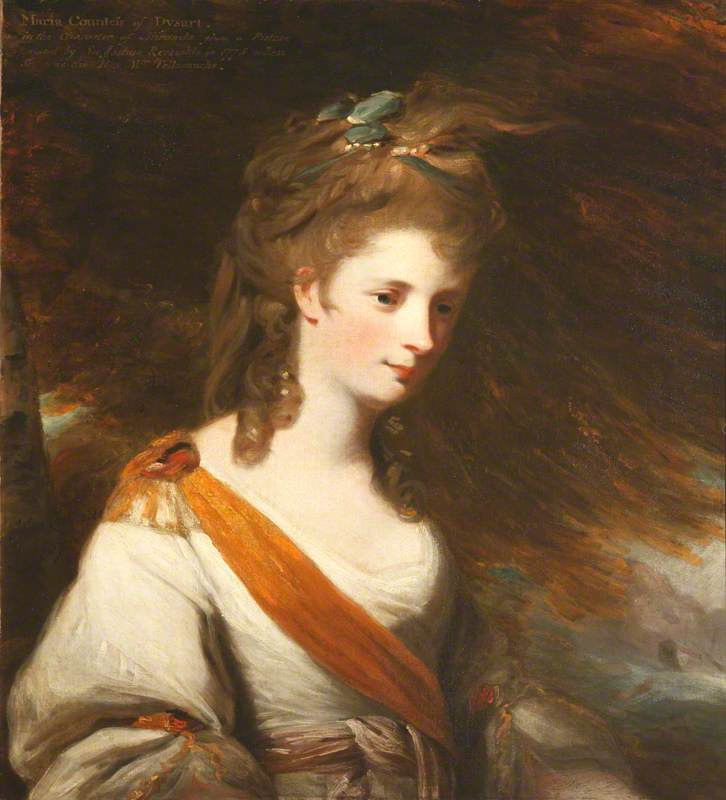
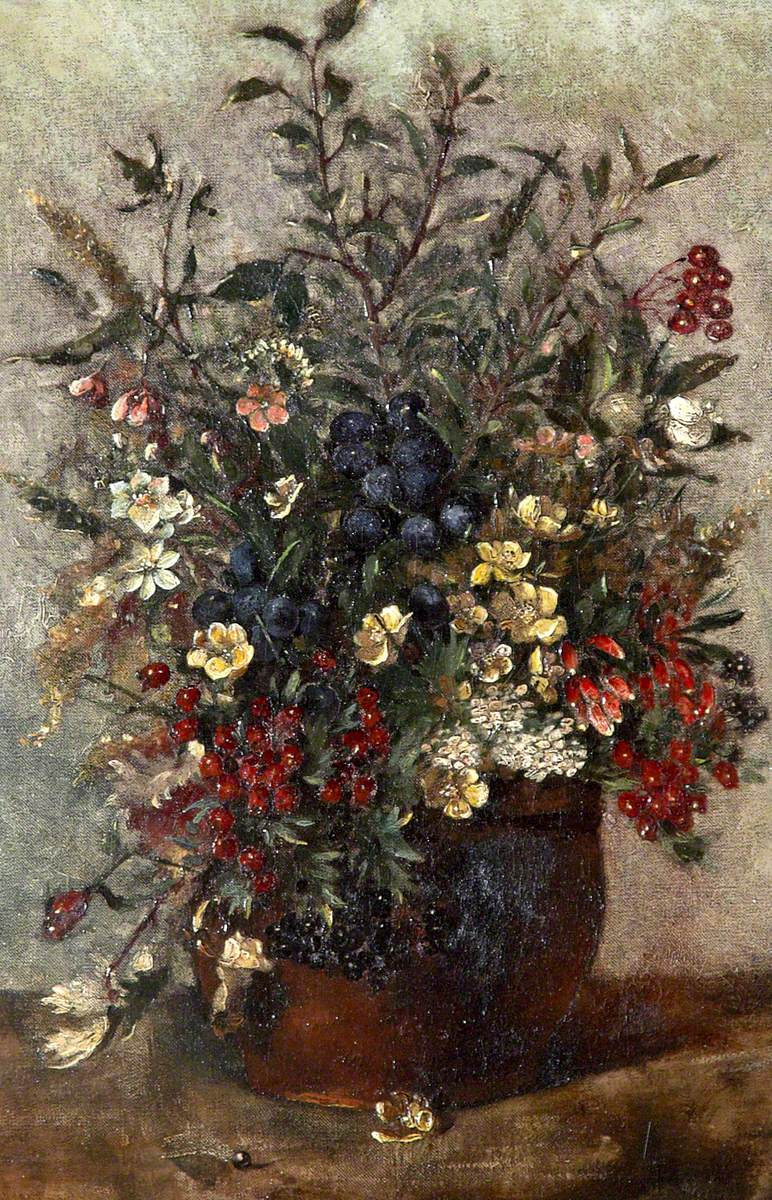
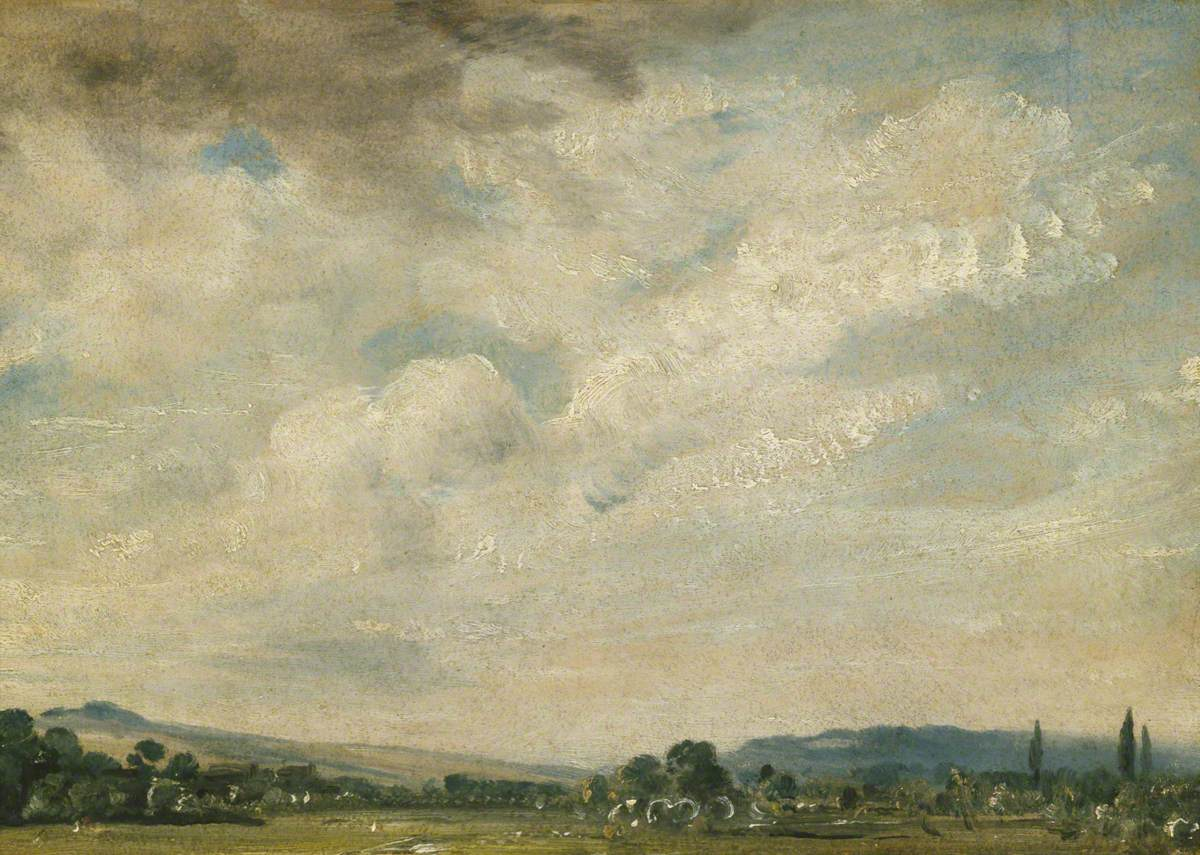
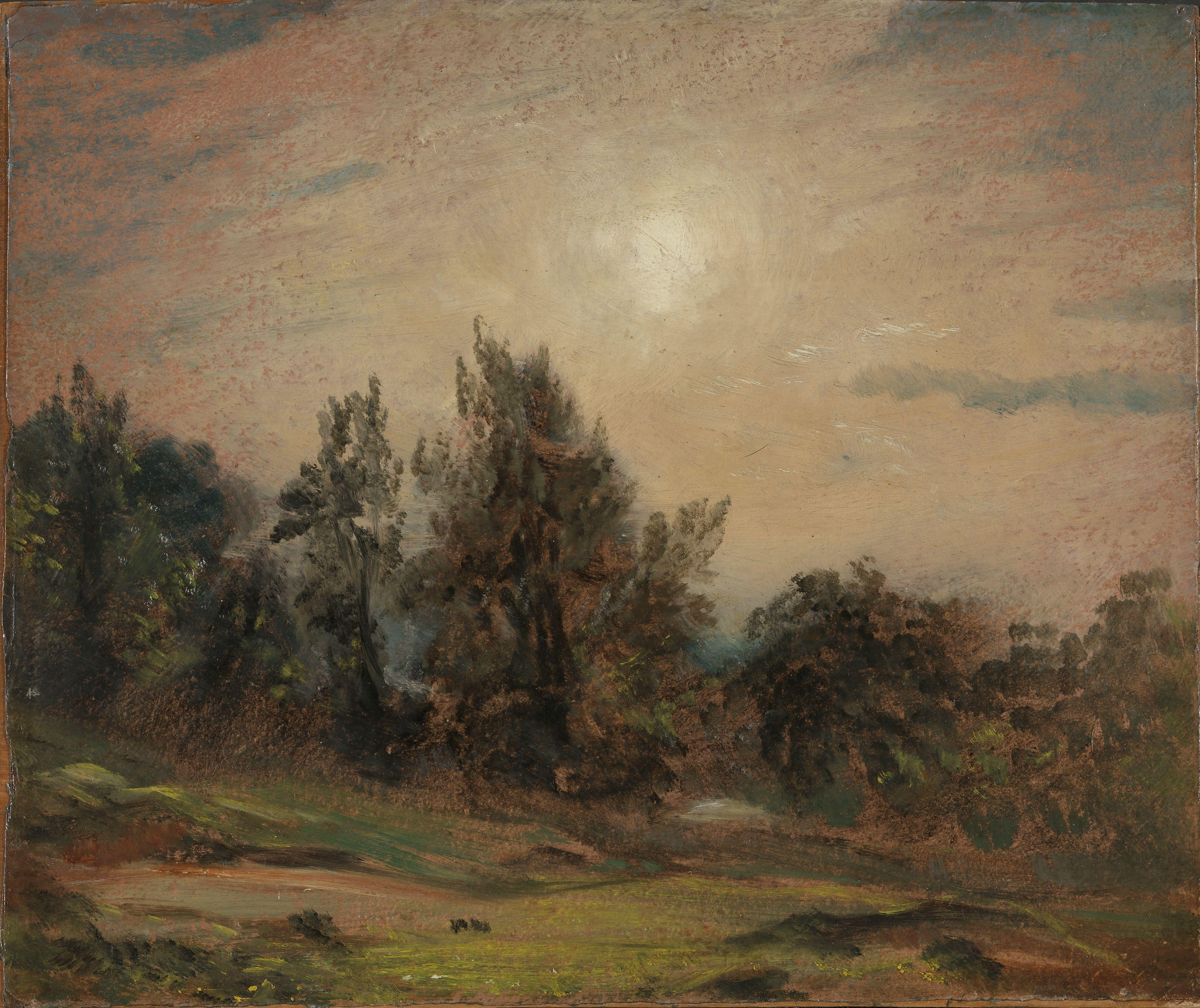
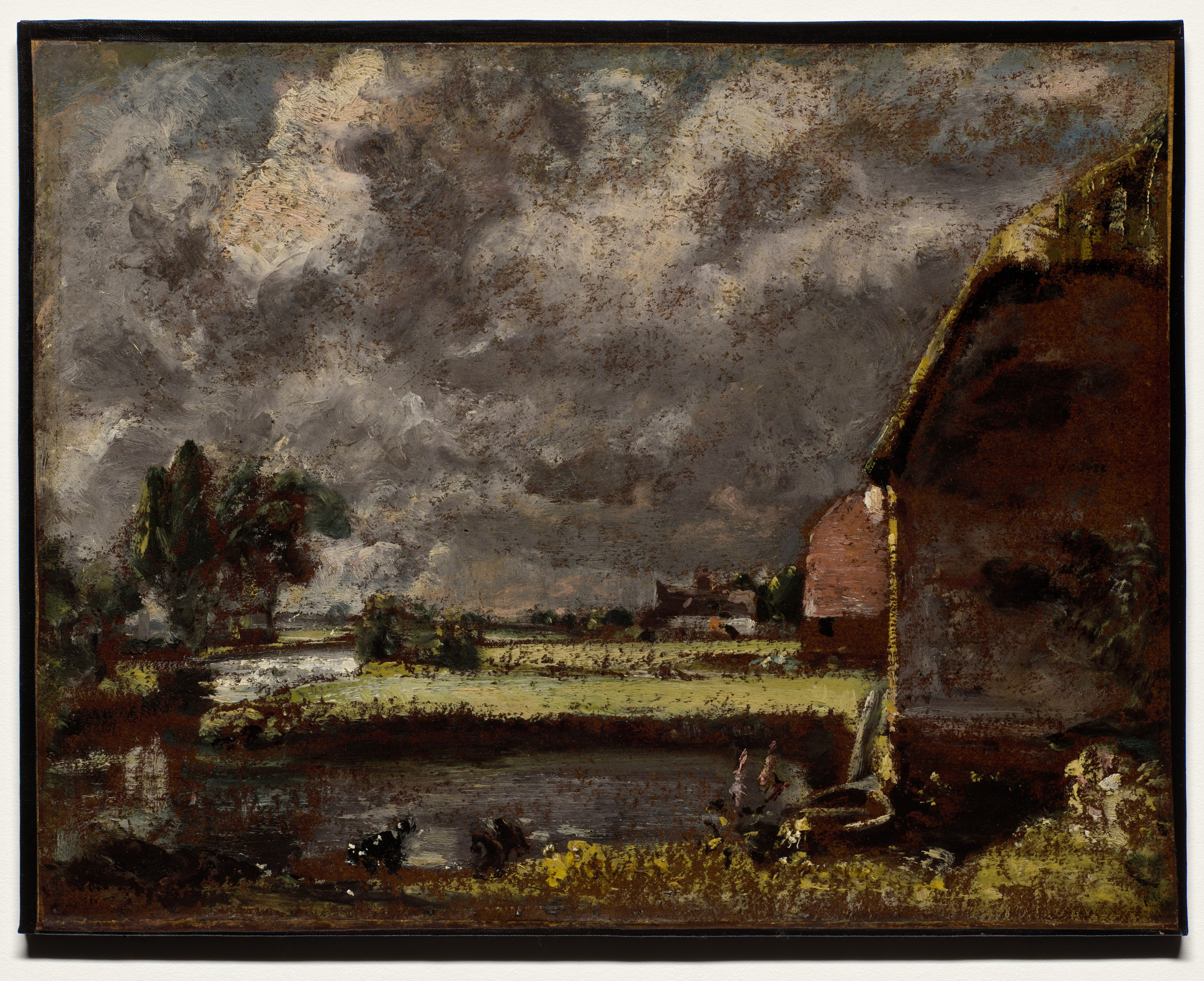
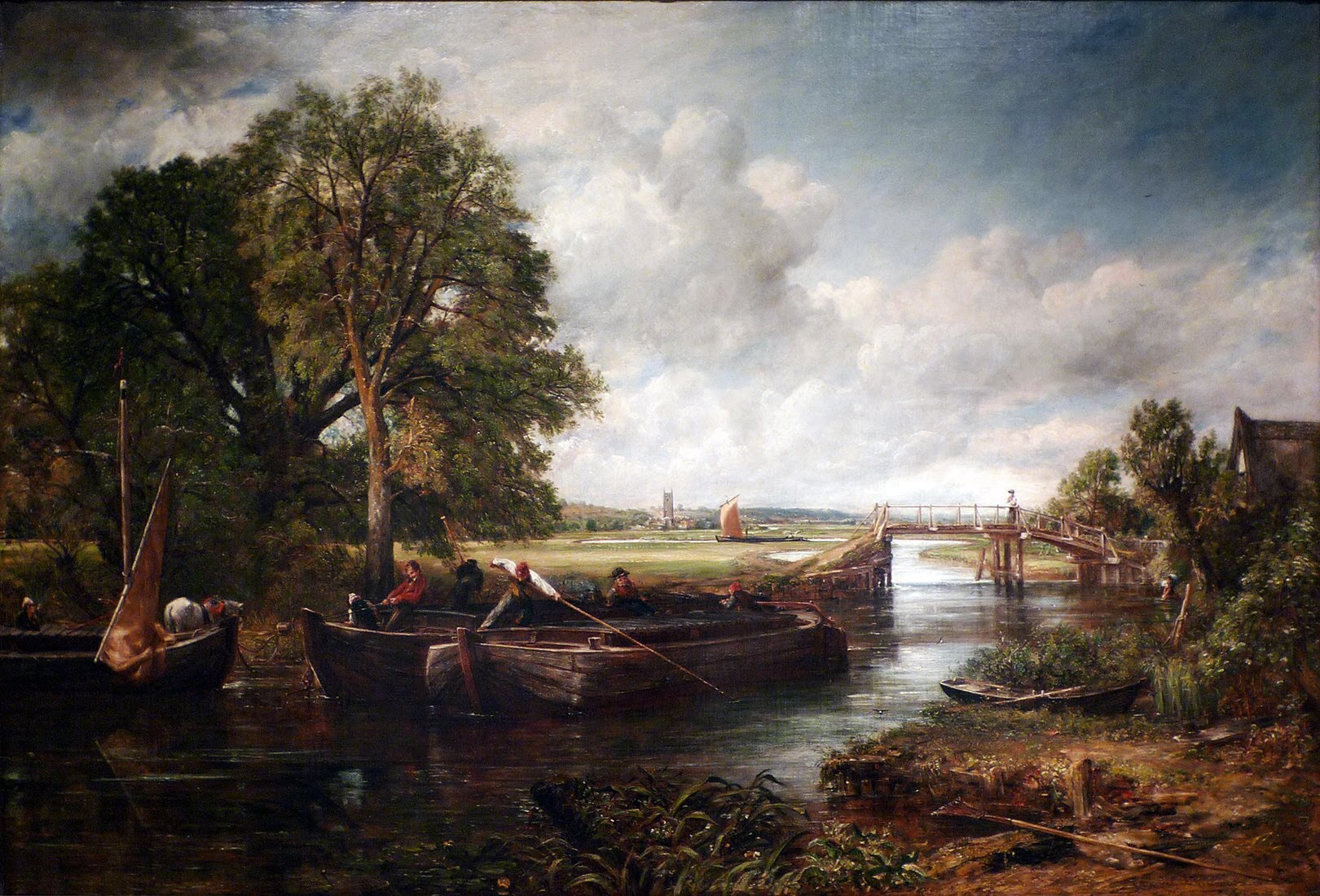
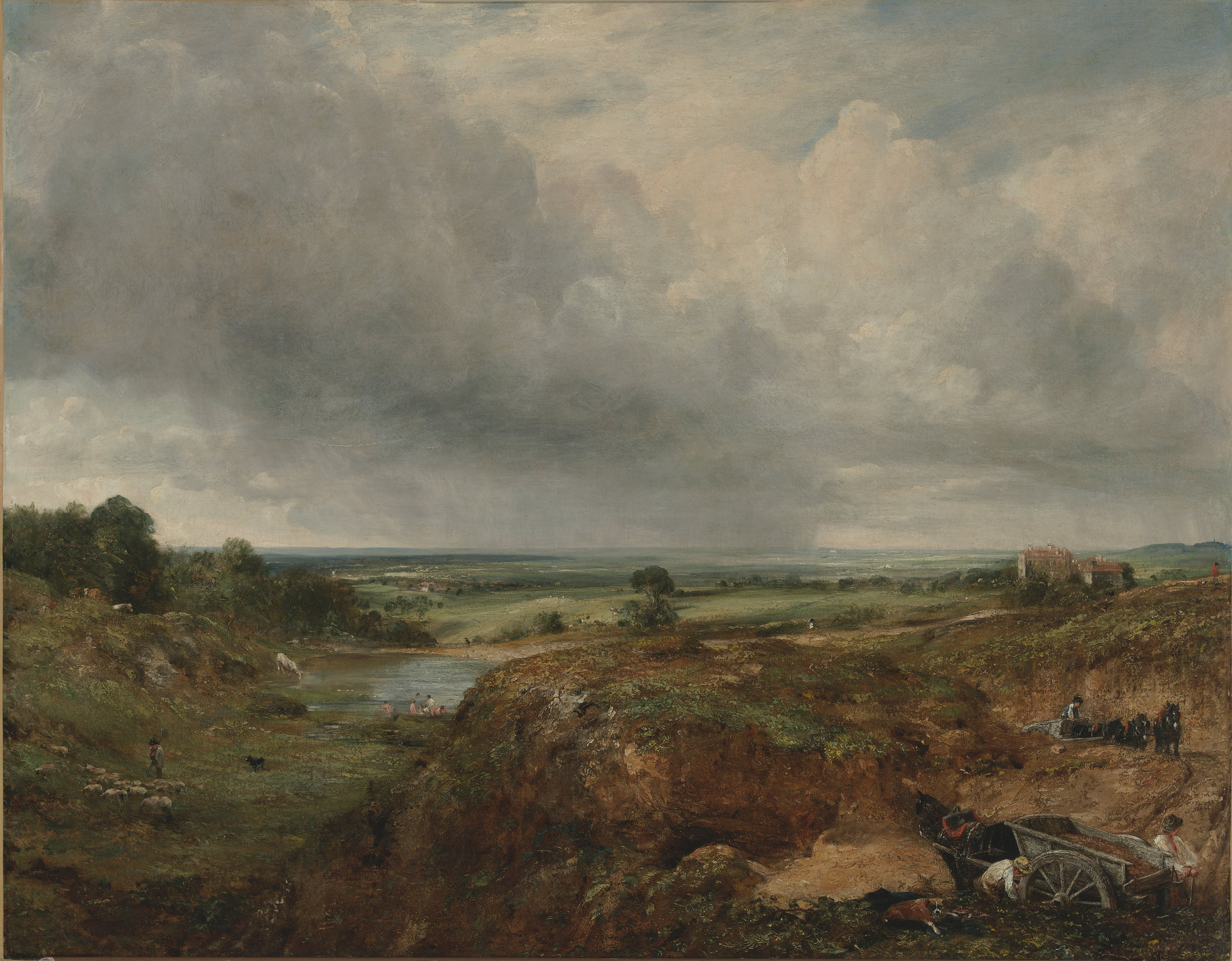
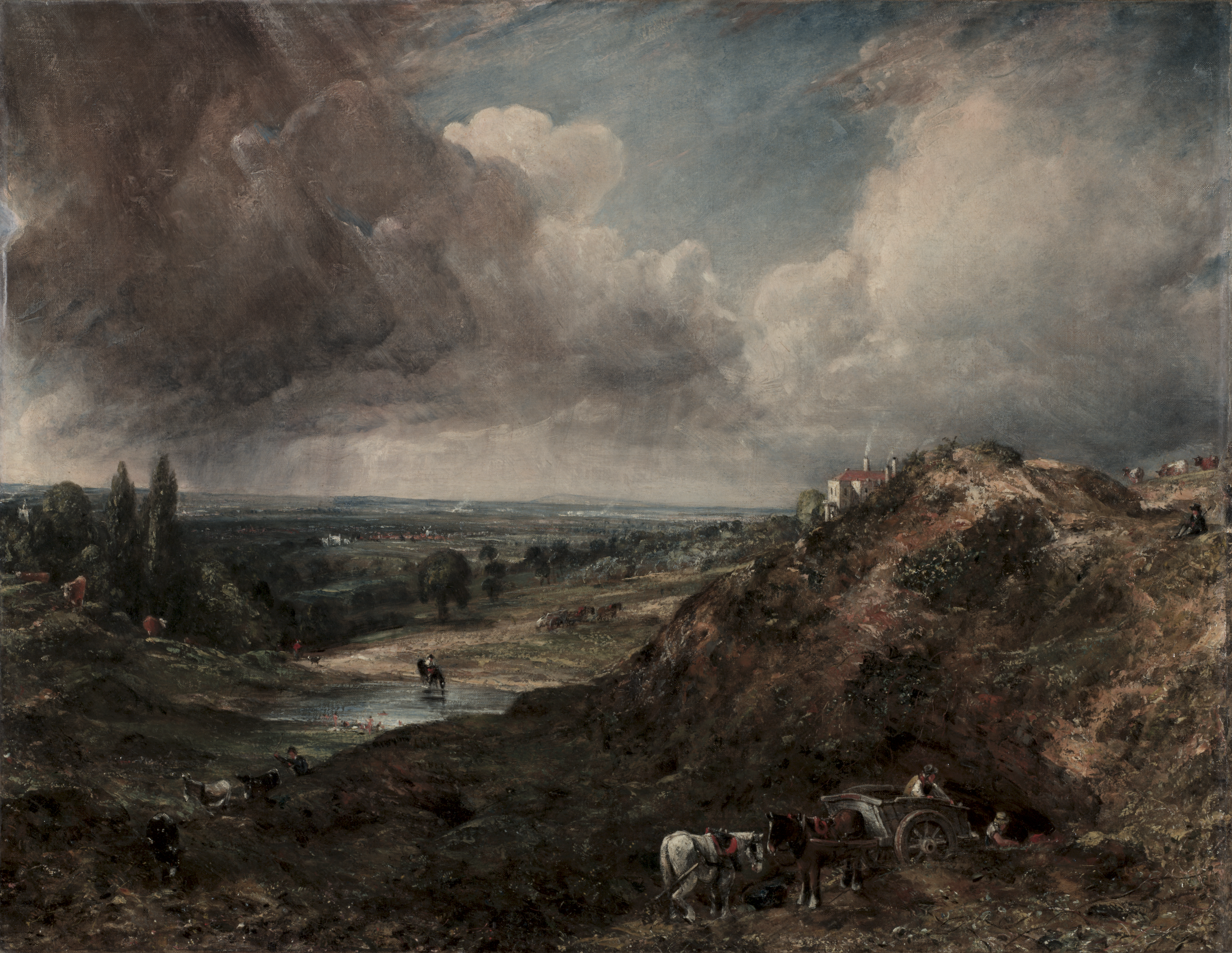
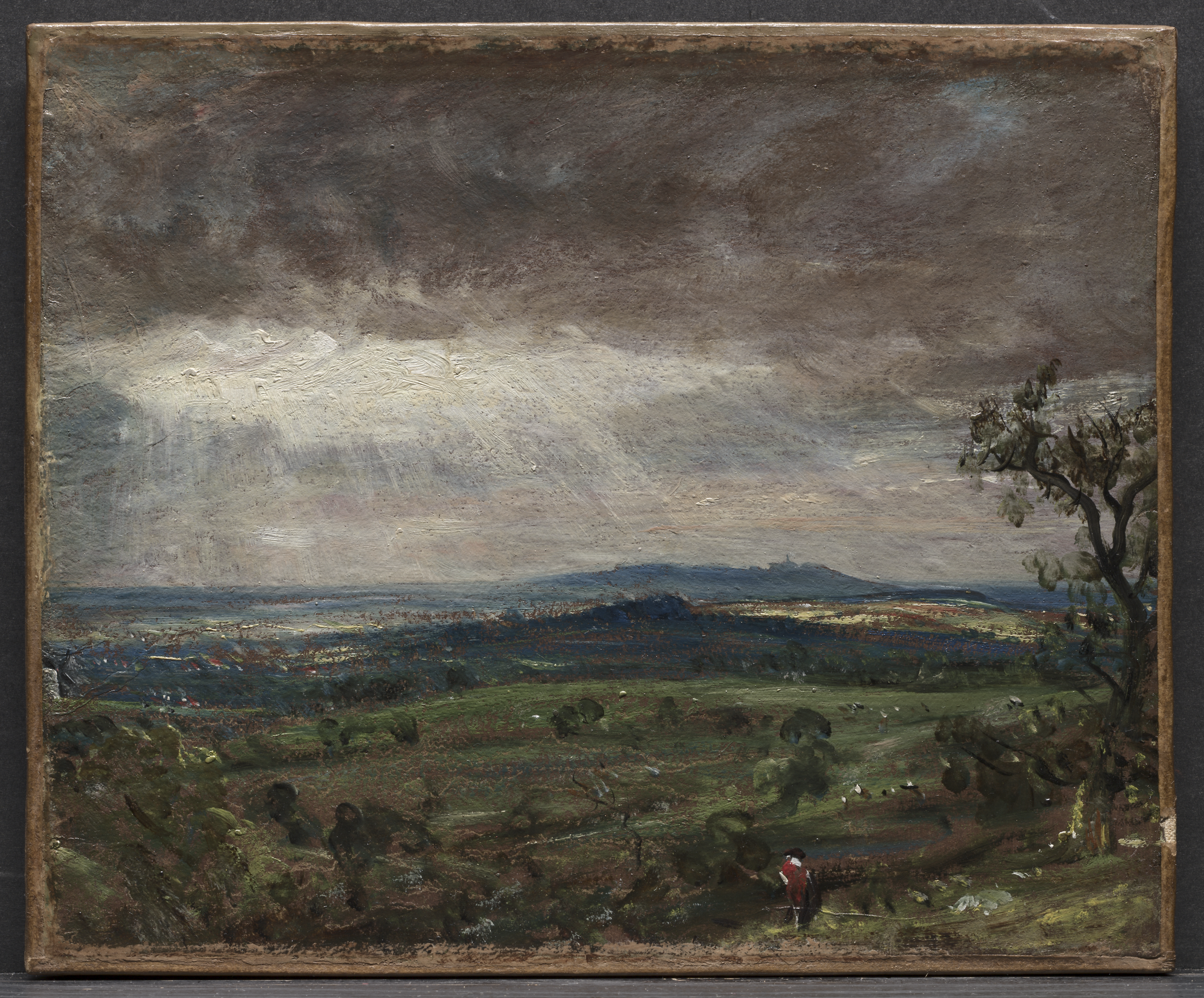
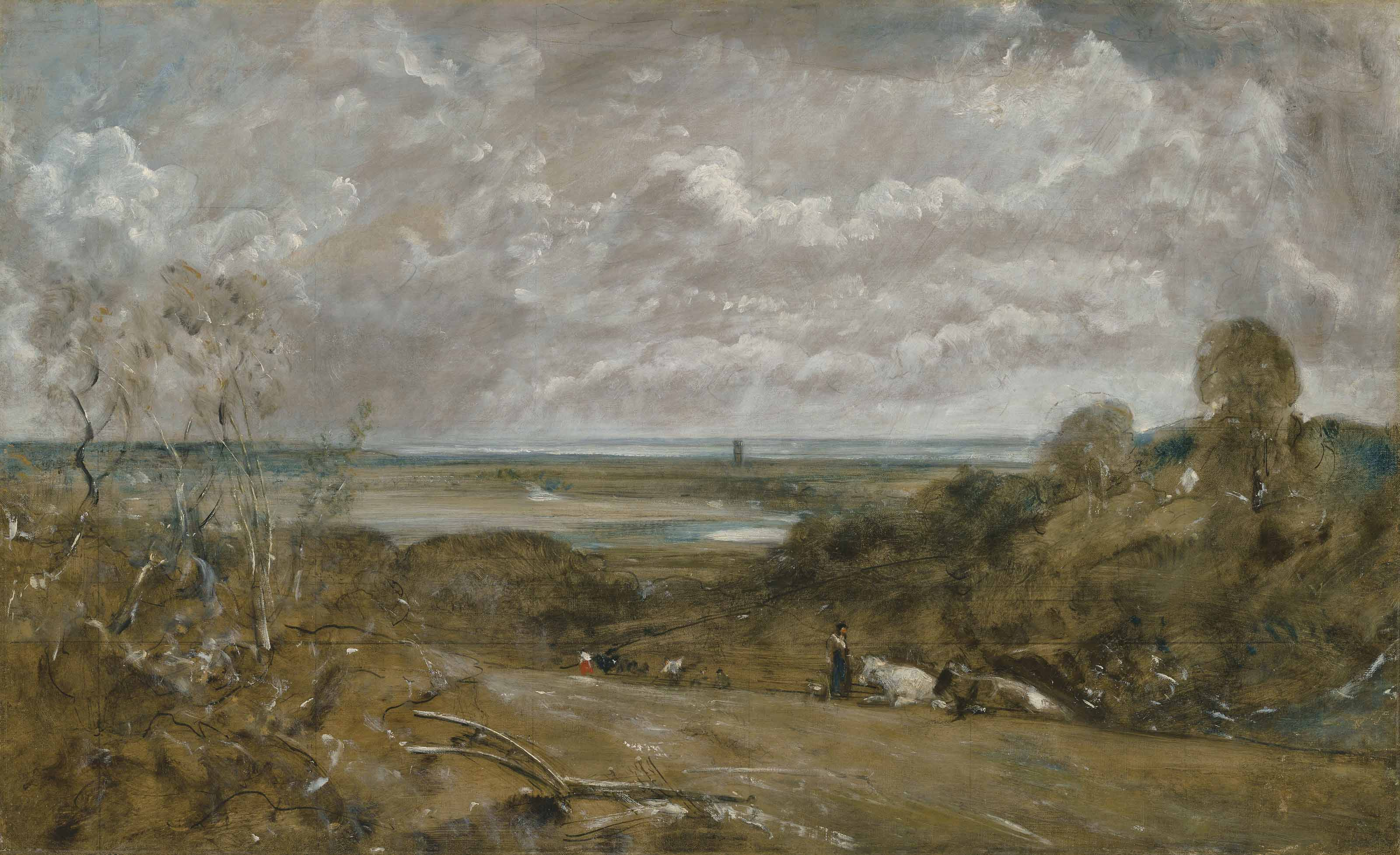
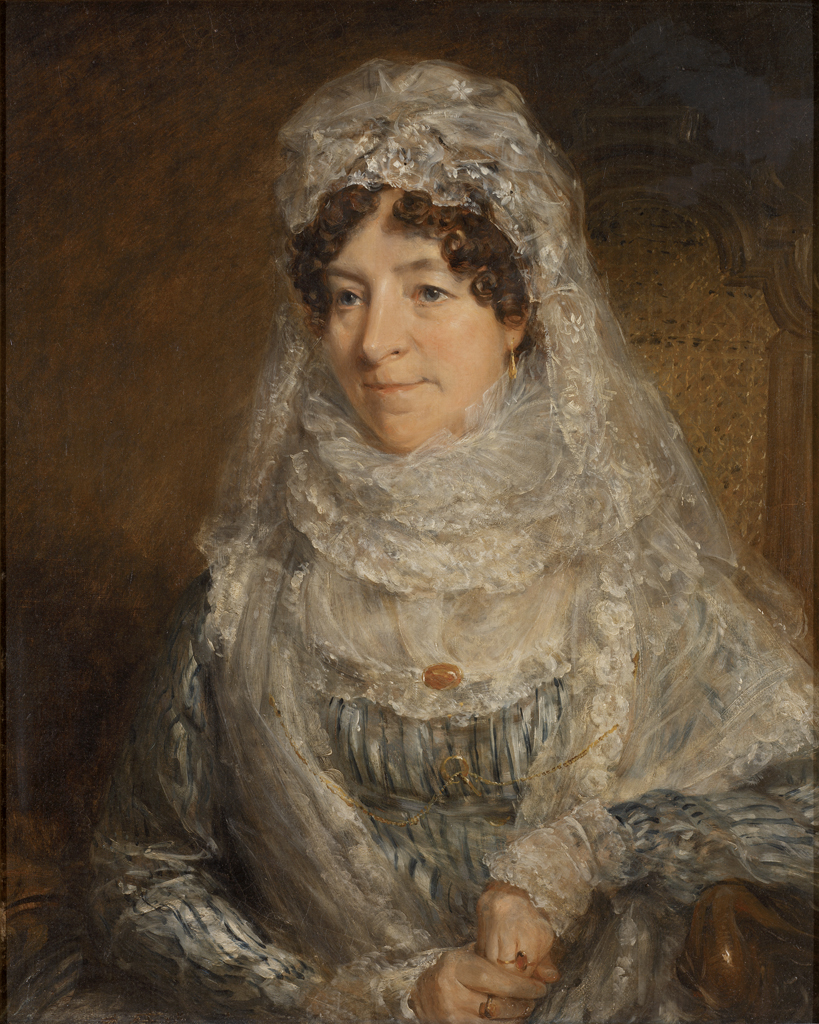
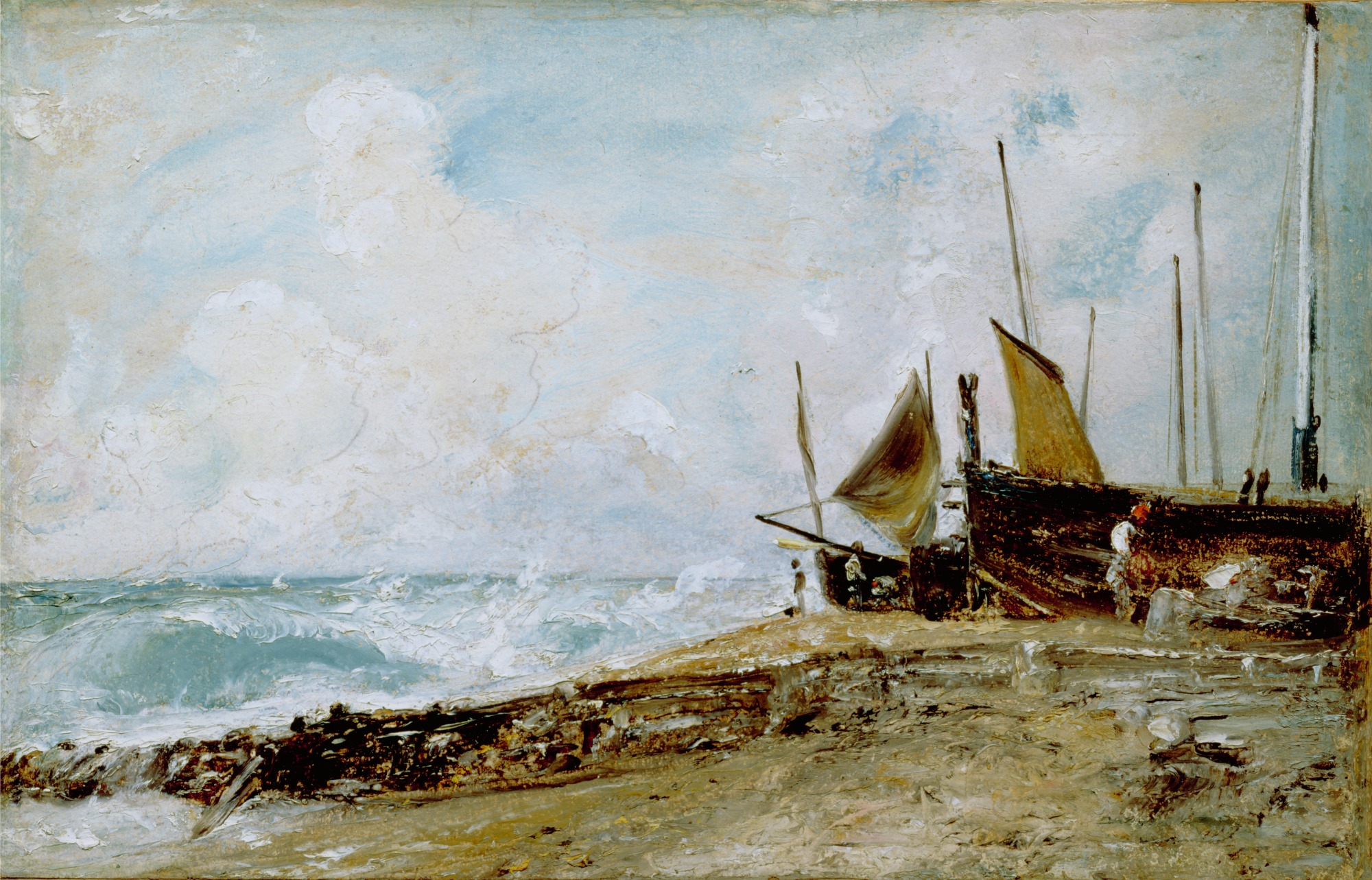
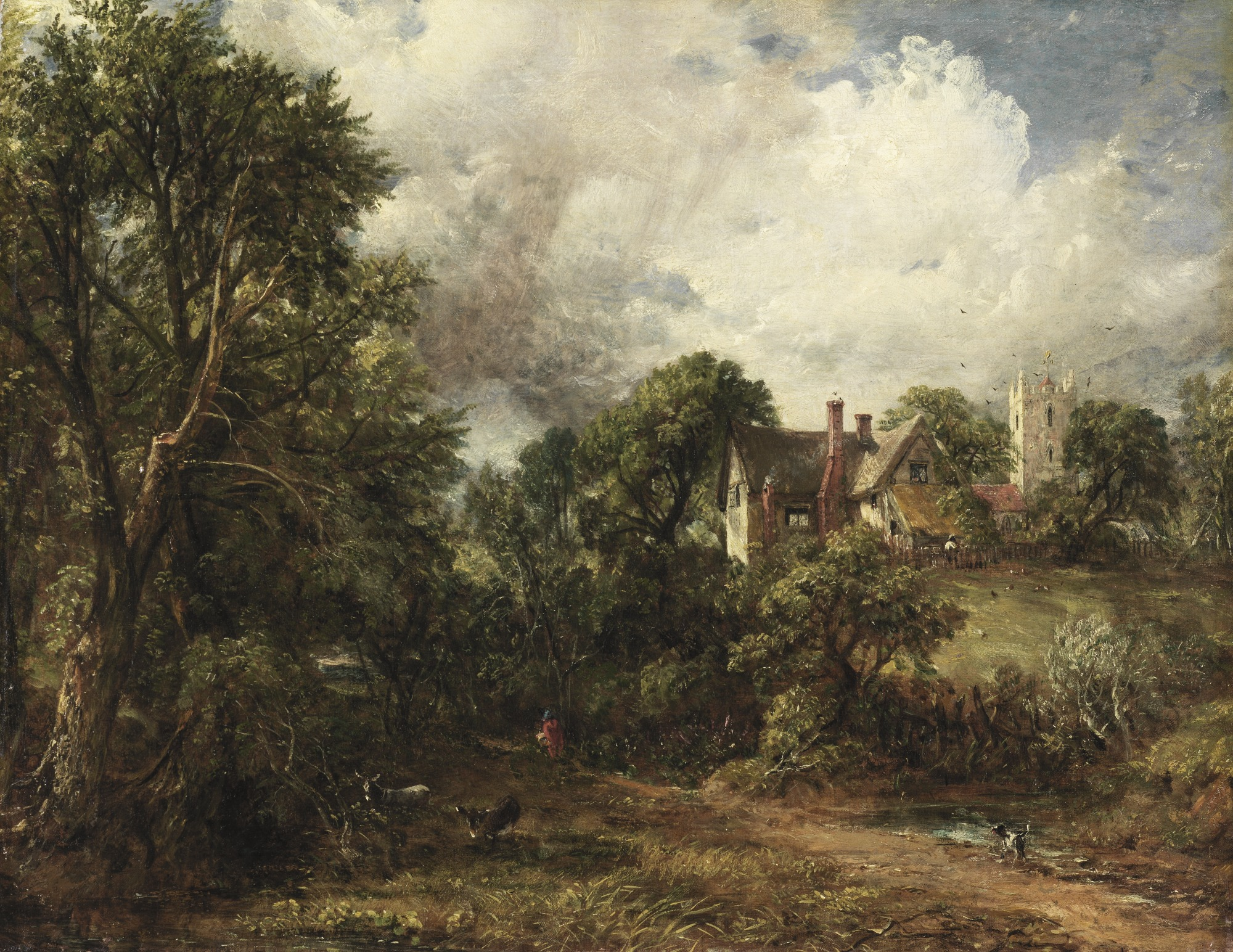
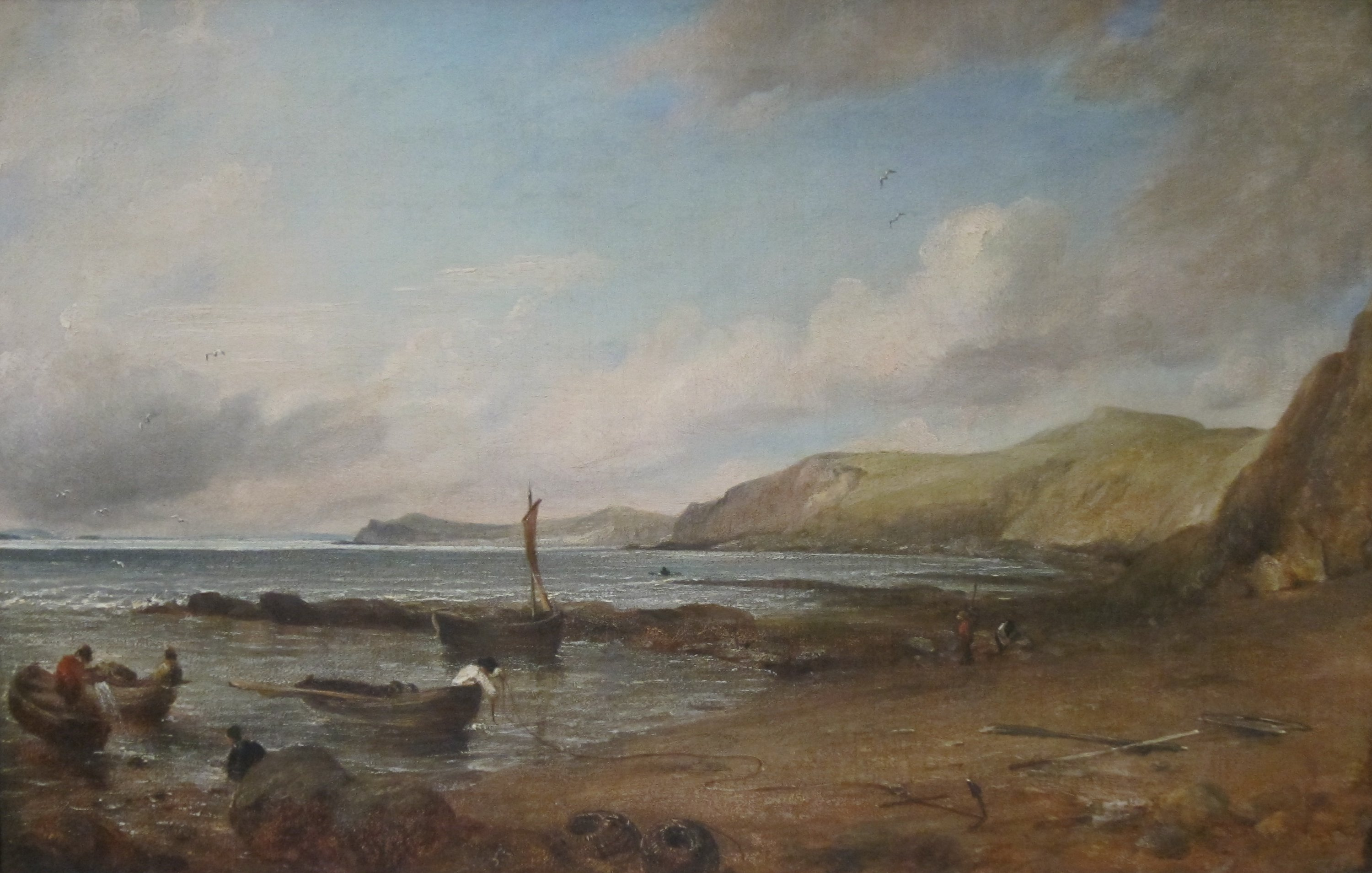
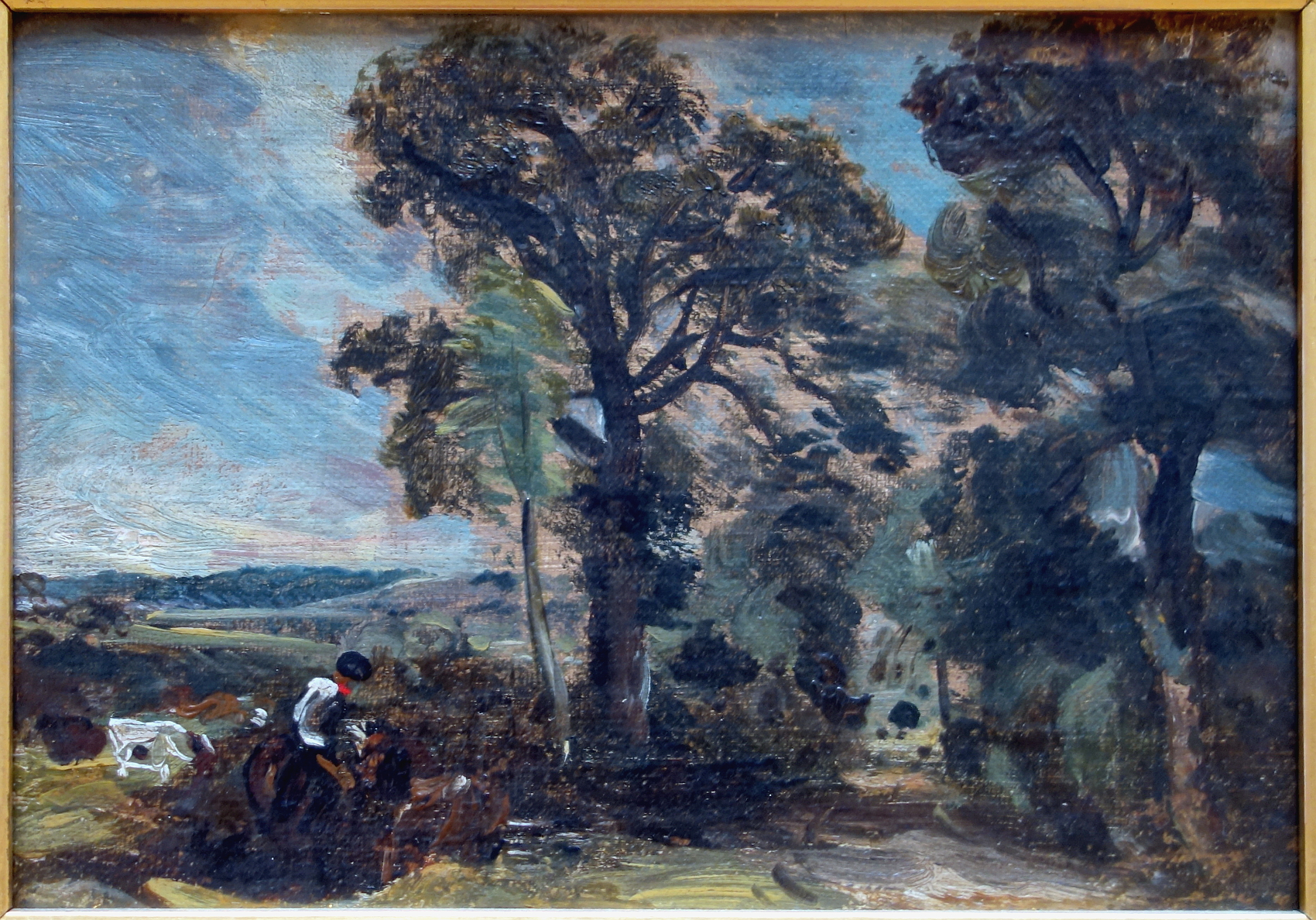
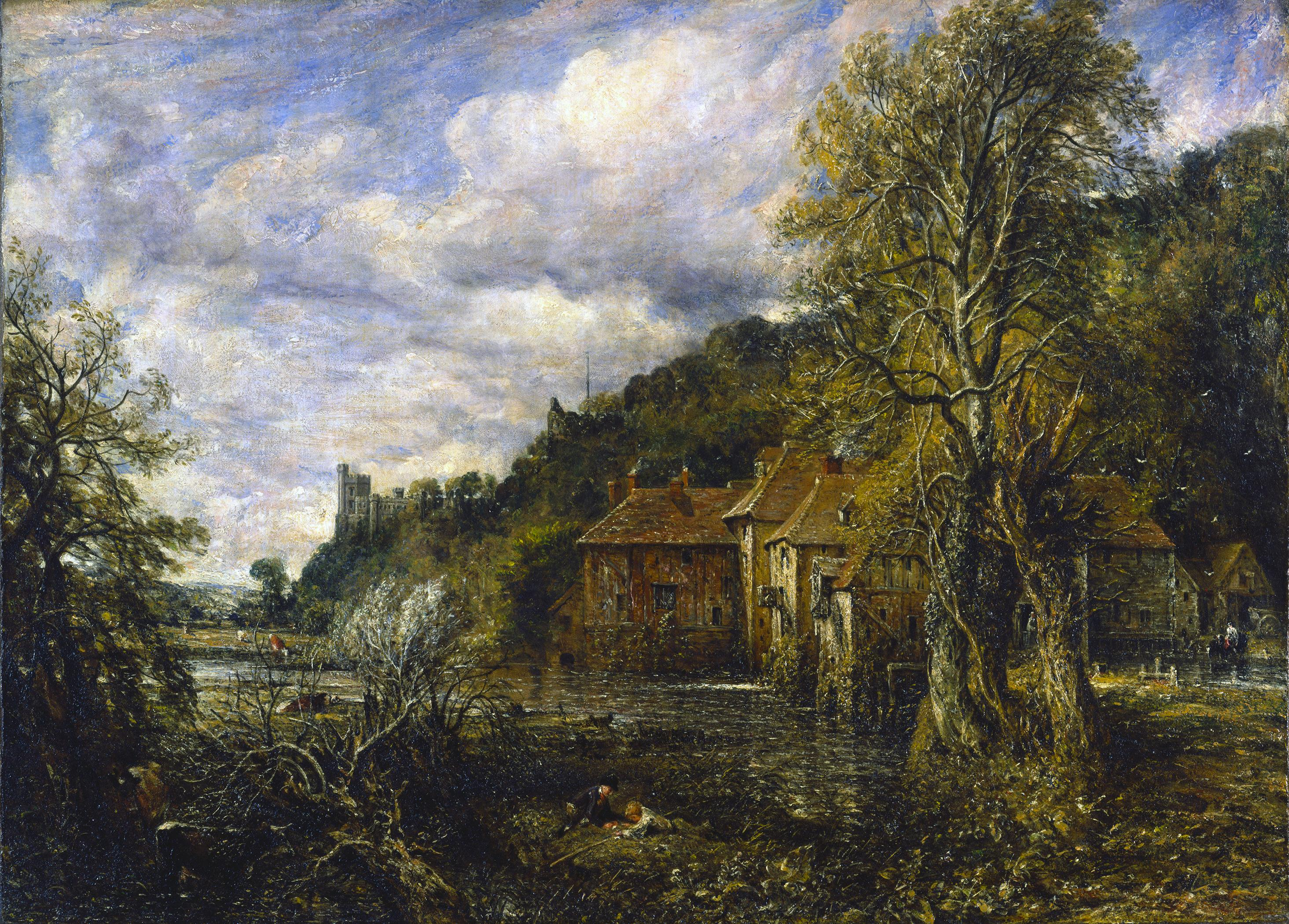
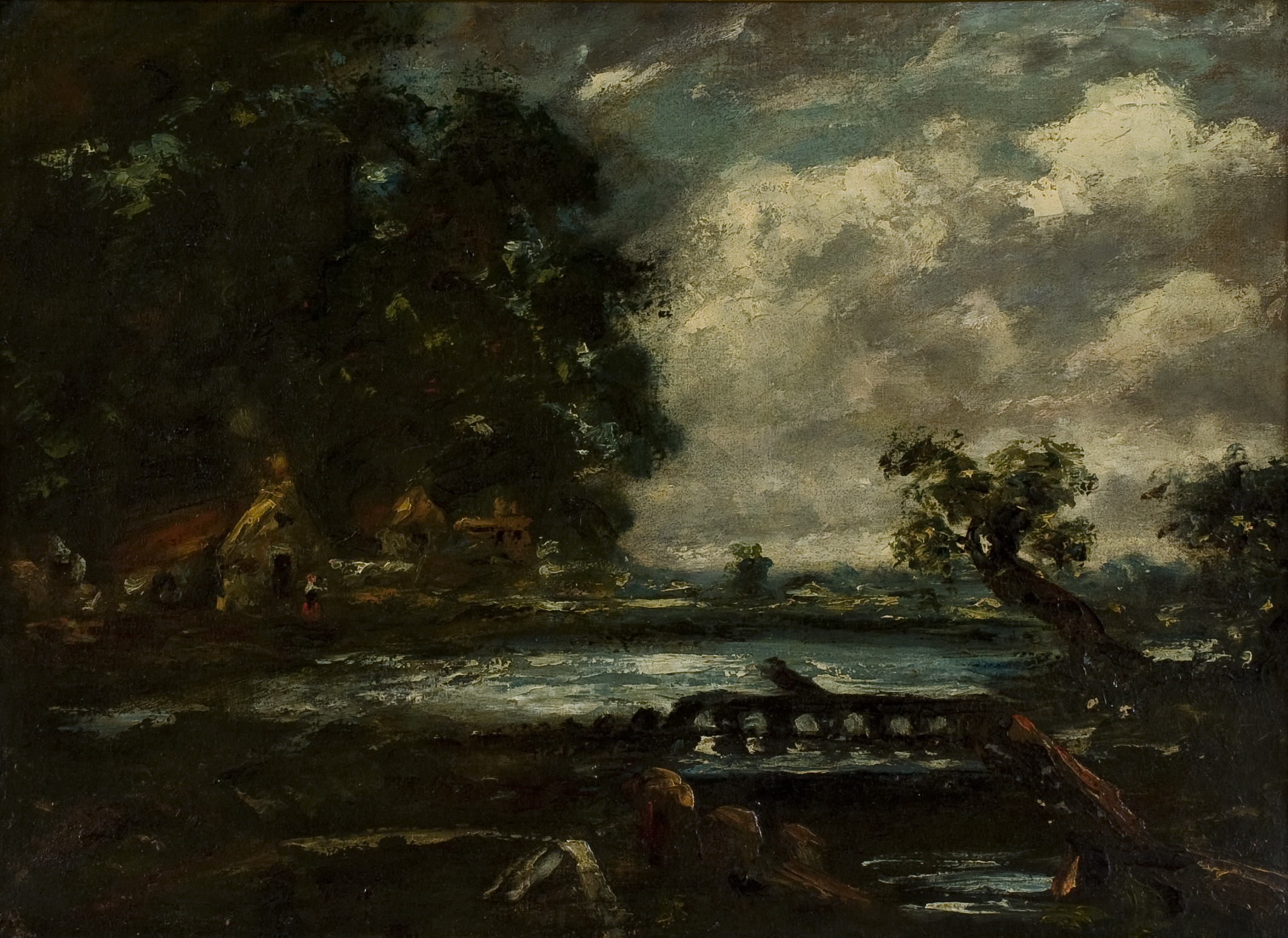
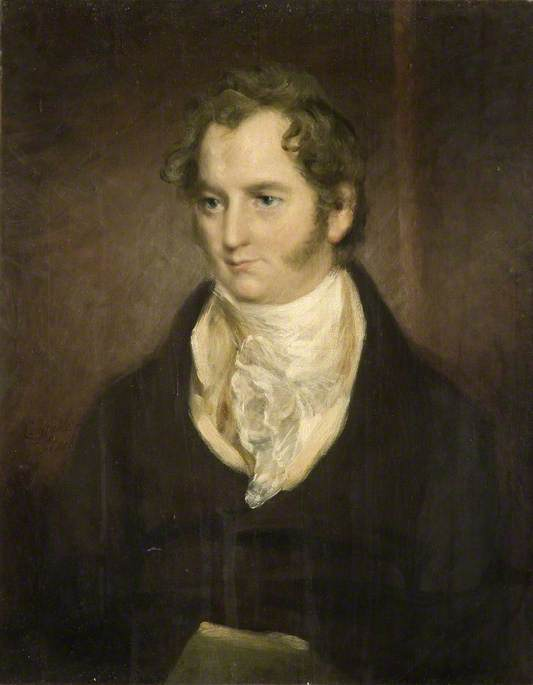
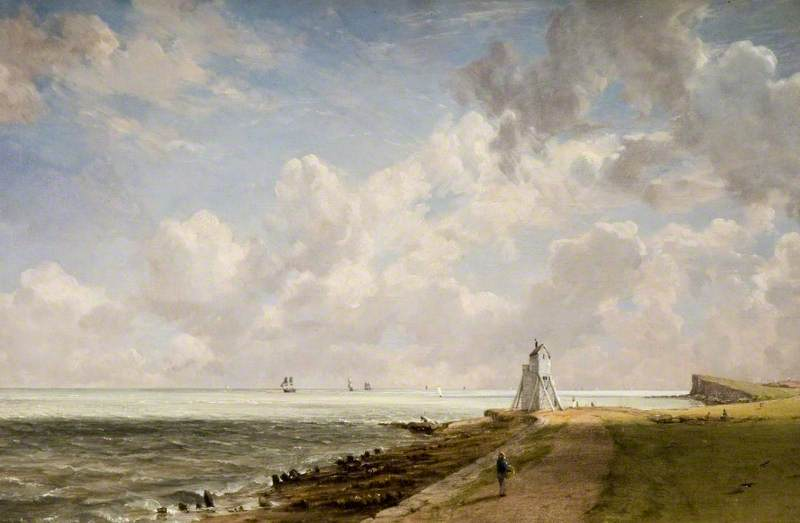
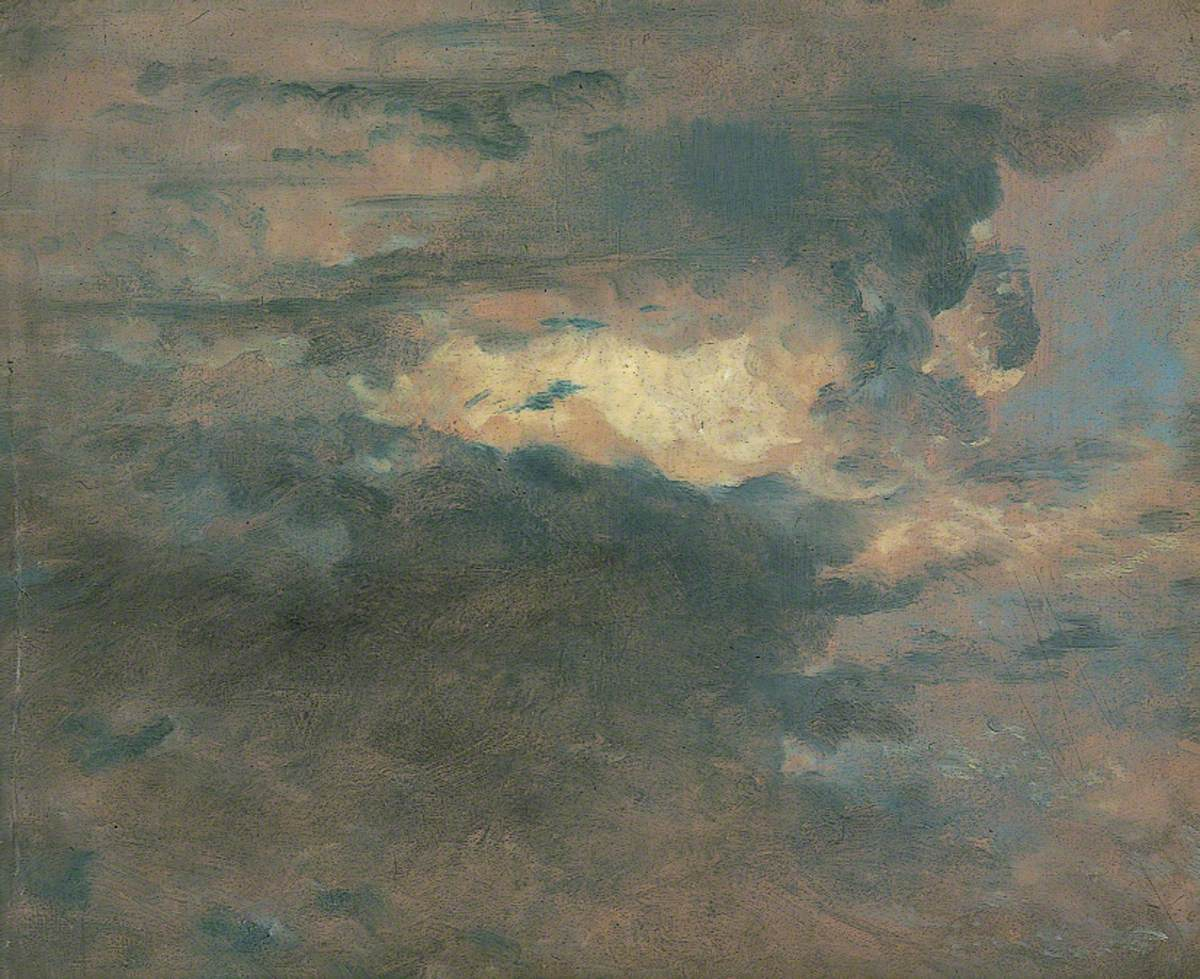
Image	Title	Year	Location
	Salisbury Cathedral from the Meadows	1831	Tate
	Salisbury Cathedral from the Bishop's Grounds	1823	Victoria and Albert Museum
	The Leaping Horse	1825	Royal Academy of Arts
	Osmington Bay	1816	Clark Art Institute
	Trees at Hampstead	1821	Victoria and Albert Museum
	The Wheat Field	1816	Clark Art Institute
	Waterloo Bridge Seen from Whitehall Stairs	1829	Clark Art Institute
	Sketch for The Opening of Waterloo Bridge Seen from Whitehall Stairs, June 18th 1817	1819	Clark Art Institute
	Dedham Lock and Mill	1820	Victoria and Albert Museum
	A Boat Passing a Lock	1826	Royal Academy of Arts
	Sandbanks and a Cart and Horses on Hampstead Heath	1820-1825	Clark Art Institute
	Weymouth Bay: Bowleaze Cove and Jordon Hill	1816	National Gallery
	View of Lower Terrace, Hampstead	1822	Victoria and Albert Museum	A Cottage in a Cornfield	1817	National Museum Wales
	The Cornfield	1826	National Gallery
	The Hay Wain	1821	National Gallery
	Malvern Hall	1821	Clark Art Institute
	Englefield House	1832	Private collection
	Cottage at East Bergholt	1833	Lady Lever Art Gallery
	Boat-Building Near Flatford Mill	1815	Victoria and Albert Museum
	Water Meadows near Salisbury	1820	Victoria and Albert Museum
	Hampstead Heath, Branch Hill Pond	1828	Victoria and Albert Museum
	Old Sarum	1834	Victoria and Albert Museum
	Stonehenge	1835	Victoria and Albert Museum
	Cenotaph to the Memory of Sir Joshua Reynolds	1836	National Gallery
	Chain Pier, Brighton	1827	Tate
	Flatford Mill	1816 1811	Tate
	Dedham Vale	1811	Private collection
	Stratford Saint Mary from the Coombs	c. 1800	Clark Art Institute
	Old Hall, East Bergholt	1801	Private collection
	Dedham Vale	1802	Victoria and Albert Museum
	Woodland Scene Overlooking Dedham Vale	c. 1802-1803	Clark Art Institute
	Bow Fell, Cumberland	1807	Clark Art Institute
	Dedham Church from Flatford	1810	Clark Art Institute
	Flatford Mill from the Lock	1810	Clark Art Institute
	Dedham Vale from the Road to East Bergholt, Sunset	1810	Clark Art Institute
	Study of a Burdock	1810-14 or 1828	Clark Art Institute
	Flatford Mill from the Lock	1812	Private collection
	Willy Lott's House (recto); Landscape Sketches with Trees and Church Tower (verso)	c.1812–13 (recto); c.1811–13	Clark Art Institute
	Flailing Turnip-heads, East Bergholt	1812-15	Clark Art Institute
	East Bergholt Common, View Toward the Rectory	1813	Clark Art Institute
	Boys Fishing	1813	Anglesey Abbey, Cambridgeshire
	The Mill Stream	1814	Christchurch Mansion, Ipswich
	Hadleigh Castle	1829	Tate
	The Valley Farm	1835	Tate
	The Lock	1824	private collection
	Wivenhoe Park	1816	National Gallery of Art
	The Watermill		Nationalmuseum
	Vale of Health, Hampstead	c.1827	Victoria and Albert Museum
	The Vale of Dedham	1828	National Galleries of Scotland
	The Grove, or the Admiral's House in Hampstead	1821	Berlin State Museums
	The Old Mill	1820	Walters Art Museum
	Landscape	18th century	MuMa Museum of modern art André Malraux
	Helmingham Dell. Vallon dans le parc de Helmingham	1800s	Department of Paintings of the Louvre
	Vue de Salisbury	1800s	Department of Paintings of the Louvre
	The White Horse	1819	The Frick Collection
	Salisbury Cathedral from the Bishop's Garden	1800s	Metropolitan Museum of Art
	Salisbury Cathedral from the Bishop's Garden	1826	The Frick Collection
	Salisbury Cathedral from the Bishop's Garden	1821	São Paulo Museum of Art
	Mrs. James Pulham Sr. (Frances Amys, ca. 1766–1856)	1818	Metropolitan Museum of Art
	Willy Lott's House from the Stour	1818	Ashmolean Museum
	Stoke-by-Nayland	1810	Metropolitan Museum of Art
	Hampstead Heath with Bathers	18th century	Metropolitan Museum of Art
	Netley Abbey	1800s	Herbert F. Johnson Museum of Art
	Stonehenge at Sunset	1836	Yale Center for British Art
	The White Horse	1800s	National Gallery of Art
	Salisbury Cathedral from Lower Marsh Close	1820	National Gallery of ArtAndrew W. Mellon collection
	Cloud Study: Stormy Sunset	1800s	National Gallery of Art
	A View on Hampstead Heath with Harrow in the Distance	1822	Fine Arts Museums of San Francisco
	Arundel Mill		Fine Arts Museums of San Francisco
	Hampstead, Stormy Sky	1814	Art Institute of Chicago
	Stoke-by-Nayland	1836	Art Institute of Chicago
	Landscape with Cottages	18th century	Art Institute of Chicago
	Study of a Windmill	18th century	Statens Museum for Kunst
	The Quarters behind Alresford Hall	1816	National Gallery of Victoria
	West End Fields, Hampstead, noon	1822	National Gallery of Victoria
	Clouds	1822	National Gallery of Victoria
	Study of A boat passing a lock	1800s	National Gallery of Victoria
	Keswick Lake		National Gallery of Victoria
	The Mill Stream	18th century	Statens Museum for Kunst
	Landscape with goatherd and goats (after Claude)	1823	Art Gallery of New South Wales
	A Heath		Museum of Fine Arts
	A Hilltop (His Native Village)	1809	Museum of Fine Arts
	Weymouth Bay from the Downs above Osmington Mills	1816	Museum of Fine Arts
	Portrait of a Woman		Museum of Fine Arts
	Stour Valley and Dedham Church	1814	Museum of Fine Arts
	Branch Hill Pond, Hampstead Heath		Philadelphia Museum of Art
	Branch Hill Pond, Hampstead Heath		Philadelphia Museum of Art
	Coast Scene, Brighton		Philadelphia Museum of Art
	Dell at Helmingham Park		Philadelphia Museum of Art
	Dell at Helmingham Park		Philadelphia Museum of Art
	Gandish Cottage, Suffolk		Philadelphia Museum of Art
	Hampstead Heath	1821	Philadelphia Museum of Art
	Hilly Landscape		Philadelphia Museum of Art
	Landscape (possibly the Stour valley)		Philadelphia Museum of Art
	Landscape with a Lock		Philadelphia Museum of Art
	Landscape with a River		Philadelphia Museum of Art
	Landscape with Brushwood		Philadelphia Museum of Art
	Marine		Philadelphia Museum of Art
	Mill		Philadelphia Museum of Art
	Near Bergholt Common		Philadelphia Museum of Art
	Osmington Bay		Philadelphia Museum of Art
	Portrait of a Girl		Philadelphia Museum of Art
	Portrait of Master Crosby	1808	Philadelphia Museum of Art
	Rising Moon		Philadelphia Museum of Art
	Road to the Spaniards, Hampstead	1822	Philadelphia Museum of Art
	Sketch for A Boat Passing a Lock	1800s	Philadelphia Museum of Art
	Sketch for The Marine Parade and Chain Pier, Brighton		Philadelphia Museum of Art
	Sketch for The Marine Parade and Chain Pier, Brighton		Philadelphia Museum of Art
	The Stour	1810	Philadelphia Museum of Art
	The Stour		Philadelphia Museum of Art
	Two Donkeys	1816	Philadelphia Museum of Art
	View toward the Rectory, East Bergholt	1810	Philadelphia Museum of Art
	Golding Constable's Flower Garden	1815	Ipswich Museum
	Golding Constable's Vegetable Garden	1815	Ipswich Museum
	Windmills in landscape.	18th century	National Museum in Warsaw
	Rushes by a pool	1821	Yale Center for British Art
	A View from Hampstead Heath (?)	1825	Yale Center for British Art
	Horse and Cart		Yale Center for British Art
	A Cloud Study, Sunset	1821	Yale Center for British Art
	Cloud Study	1821	Yale Center for British Art
	Cloud Study		Yale Center for British Art
	Cloud Study with Tree	1821	Yale Center for British Art
	Cloud Study	1821	Yale Center for British Art
	Cloud Study	1821	Yale Center for British Art
	Extensive Landscape with Grey Cloud	1821	Yale Center for British Art
	Fen Lane, East Bergholt	1811	Yale Center for British Art
	Captain Richard Gubbin	1805	Yale Center for British Art
	Hampstead Heath, with a Bonfire	1822	Yale Center for British Art
	Sir Richard Steele's Cottage, Hampstead	1832	Yale Center for British Art
	Somerset House Terrace from Waterloo Bridge	1819	Yale Center for British Art
	East Bergholt Church	1809	Yale Center for British Art
	Barge below Flatford Lock	1810	Yale Center for British Art
	Flatford Lock	1800s	Yale Center for British Art
	Osmington Village	1817	Yale Center for British Art
	Golding Constable's House, East Bergholt: the Artist's birthplace	1809	Yale Center for British Art
	West Lodge, East Bergholt	1800s	Yale Center for British Art
	Half-size Sketch for The Opening of Waterloo Bridge (“Whitehall Stairs, June 18, 1817”)	18th century	Yale Center for British Art
	Flatford Mill	1800s	Yale Center for British Art
	Hadleigh Castle	1800s	Yale Center for British Art
	Hampstead Heath Looking Towards Harrow	1821	Yale Center for British Art
	Dedham Lock	18th century	Yale Center for British Art
	Hadleigh Castle, The Mouth of the Thames--Morning after a Stormy Night	1829	Yale Center for British Art
	Ploughing Scene in Suffolk	1825	Yale Center for British Art
	Dedham Lock	18th century	Yale Center for British Art
	Cloud Study	1821	Yale Center for British Art
	Malvern Hall, Warwickshire	1800s	Yale Center for British Art
	Dedham Vale	1802	Yale Center for British Art
	Mary Freer	1809	Yale Center for British Art
	Coastal Scene with Cliff	1814	Yale Center for British Art
	Lane near Dedham	1802	Yale Center for British Art
	Parham Mill, Gillingham	1826	Yale Center for British Art
	Bardon Hill, Coleorton Hall	1823	Yale Center for British Art
	Hove Beach	1800s	Yale Center for British Art
	Study of a Cloudy Sky	1825	Yale Center for British Art
	A Shepherd in a Landscape looking across Dedham Vale towards Langham	1811	Yale Center for British Art
	Study of an Ash Tree	1800s	Yale Center for British Art
	Undergrowth	1821	Yale Center for British Art
	Harnham Gate, Salisbury	1821	Yale Center for British Art
	Sketch for "The Haywain"	1820	Yale Center for British Art
	A View at Hampstead with Stormy Weather	1830	Yale Center for British Art
	Harwich: The Low Lighthouse and Beacon Hill	1820	Yale Center for British Art
	East Bergholt	1813	Yale Center for British Art
	Stormy Sea, Brighton	1828	Yale Center for British Art
	Cloud Study	1821	Yale Center for British Art
	Cloud Study	1822	Yale Center for British Art
	Cloud Study, Early Morning, Looking East from Hampstead	1821	Yale Center for British Art
	An Autumnal Landscape at East Bergholt	1800s	Yale Center for British Art
	Cloud Study	1821	Yale Center for British Art
	Hampstead Heath	18th century	Yale Center for British Art
	Hampstead Heath looking towards Harrow	1800s	Yale Center for British Art
	View Towards the Rectory, East Bergholt	1813	Yale Center for British Art
	Cloud Study	1822	Yale Center for British Art
	Stratford Mill	1820	Yale Center for British Art
	Landscape with Windmills near Haarlem, after Jacob van Ruisdael	1830	Dulwich Picture Gallery
	On the River Stour	1800s	The Phillips Collection
	English Landscape		The Phillips Collection
	Salisbury Cathedral and Leadenhall from the River Avon	1820	National Gallery
	Stratford Mill	1820	National Gallery
	Weymouth Bay with Approaching Storm	1818	Department of Paintings of the Louvre
	Landscape, Mill and Water		Auckland Art Gallery
	East Bergholt - Lock on Stour		Indianapolis Museum of Art
	The Cornfield		Indianapolis Museum of Art
	Harnham Bridge, Salisbury		Indianapolis Museum of Art
	Barge on the Canal		Indianapolis Museum of Art
	Laura Moubray, née Hobson (born 1788)	1808	National Galleries of Scotland
	On the Stour (Reverse: Study of Cows)	1830	National Galleries of Scotland
	The Artist's Daughter		Museum of Fine Arts, Houston
	The Glebe Farm	1830	TateNational Gallery
	The Cottage in a Cornfield	1833	Victoria and Albert Museum
	Branch Hill Pond, Hampstead Heath, with a Boy Sitting on a Bank	1825	TateNational Gallery
	Stoke-by-Nayland	1800s	TateNational Gallery
	Salisbury Cathedral from the Meadows	1829	TateNational Gallery
	View at Epsom	1809	TateNational Gallery
	The Mill Stream. Verso: Night Scene with Bridge	1810	TateNational Gallery
	Harwich Lighthouse	1820	TateNational Gallery
	Hampstead Heath with the Salt Box	c.1820	TateNational Gallery
	Gillingham Bridge, Dorset	1823	TateNational Gallery
	East Bergholt House	1809	TateNational Gallery
	The Glebe Farm	1830	TateNational Gallery
	Flatford Mill (‘Scene on a Navigable River’)	1817	TateNational Gallery
	Hampstead Heath with a Rainbow	1836	TateNational Gallery
	The Grove, Hampstead	1822	TateNational Gallery
	The Church Porch, East Bergholt	1810	TateNational Gallery
	Mrs James Andrew	1818	TateNational Gallery
	Chain Pier, Brighton	1800s	TateNational Gallery
	The Revd Dr James Andrew	1818	TateNational Gallery
	Malvern Hall, Warwickshire	1809	TateNational Gallery
	Maria Bicknell, Mrs John Constable	1816	TateNational Gallery
	Trunk and Lower Branches of a Tree		TateNational Gallery
	A Bank on Hampstead Heath	1800s	TateNational Gallery
	Dedham from Langham	1813	TateNational Gallery
	A Windmill near Brighton	1824	TateNational Gallery
	Trees at Hampstead	1829	TateNational Gallery
	Dedham Lock and Mill	1817	TateNational Gallery
	Yarmouth Jetty	1824	TateNational Gallery
	The Valley Farm	1835	TateNational Gallery
	The Bridges Family	1804	TateNational Gallery
	Sketch for ‘Hadleigh Castle’	1800s	TateNational Gallery
	Branch Hill Pond, Hampstead Heath, with a Cart and Carters	1825	TateNational Gallery
	Susannah Lloyd	1806	Tate
	The Opening of Waterloo Bridge	1832	Tate
	Study of a Girl in a Cloak and Bonnet	1810	Tate
	Brightwell Church and Village	1815	Tate
	Fen Lane, East Bergholt	1817	Tate
	A Cornfield	1817	Tate
	View in the Stour Valley looking towards Langham Church from Dedham	1805	Tate
	The Glebe Farm	1830	Tate
	Maria Constable with Two of her Children. Verso: Copy after Teniers	1820	Tate
	Golding Constable	1815	Tate
	Ann Constable	18th century	Tate
	The Celebration in East Bergholt of the Peace of 1814 Concluded in Paris between France and the Allied Powers	1814	Museum of Fine Arts, Budapest
	Helmingham Dell	1830	The Nelson-Atkins Museum of Art
	Écluse sur la rivière Stour	1812	Department of Paintings of the Louvre
	Vue de Hampstead Heath; Effet d'orage	1823	Department of Paintings of the Louvre
	View of Dedham Vale from East Bergholt	1815	Bavarian State Painting Collections
	Kalkbrennerei (Umkreis)	18th century	Bavarian State Painting Collections
	Waldlandschaft (Umkreis)	1820	Bavarian State Painting Collections
	Landschaft mit Fernblick und Gewitterhimmel (Hampstead Heath mit Branch Hill Pond) (Umkreis)		Bavarian State Painting Collections
	Willy Lott's Cottage	1820	private collection
	The Washing Line		Carnegie Museum of Art
	Yarmouth Jetty	1822	National Gallery of Art
	Waterloo Bridge	1820	Cincinnati Art Museum
	A Road across Hampstead Heath	1822	Yale University Art Gallery
	Das Haus des Admirals in Hampstead, genannt "The Grove"		Berlin State Museums
	Higham Village am Flusse Stour		Berlin State Museums
	Mrs Mary Fisher	1816	Fitzwilliam Museum
	Archdeacon John Fisher	1816	Fitzwilliam Museum
	Salisbury	1829	Fitzwilliam Museum
	Sky study, sunset		Fitzwilliam Museum
	East Bergholt	1808	Fitzwilliam Museum
	Sky study with mauve clouds		Fitzwilliam Museum
	Hove beach		Fitzwilliam Museum
	Parham's Mill, Gillingham, Dorset	1824	Fitzwilliam Museum
	Hampstead Heath	1820	Fitzwilliam Museum
	At Hampstead, looking towards Harrow		Fitzwilliam Museum
	Sky study with a shaft of sunlight	1822	Fitzwilliam Museum
	Shoreham Bay, near Brighton (1824)	1824	Fitzwilliam Museum
	Embarkation of George IV from Whitehall: the Opening of Waterloo Bridge, 1817	1817	National Trust
	Academic Study of a Male Nude in the same Pose as a Figure in Michelangelo’s ‘Last Judgement’ in the Sistine Chapel, Rome	1800s	National Trust
	Lamarsh House, Lamarsh, Essex	18th century	National Trust
	Cumulus Clouds over a Landscape	1822	National Trust
	Lady Louisa Tollemache, Countess of Dysart (1745-1840) (after John Hoppner)	1800s	National Trust
	Anna Maria Lewis, Countess of Dysart (1745-1804) as Miranda (after Reynolds)	1823	National Trust
	Field Flowers and Berries in a Brown Pot	1814	National Trust
	Harnham Ridge, near Salisbury	18th Century	National Trust
	Dedham Lock and Mill	1820	Currier Museum of Art
	Trees on Hampstead Heath	1821	National Museum of Art, Architecture and Design
	A View on the Banks of the River Stour		Museum of Fine Arts, Houston
	View on the Stour near Dedham	1822	Huntington Library
	Branch Hill Pond, Hampstead Heath	1824–1825	Virginia Museum of Fine Arts
	Hampstead Heath	18th century	National Gallery of Canada
	Salisbury Cathedral from the Bishop's Grounds	1820	National Gallery of Canada
	Branch Hill Pond, Hampstead	1828	Cleveland Museum of Art
	Hampstead Heath, Looking Toward Harrow	1821	Cleveland Museum of Art
	Dedham from Langham	1820	private collection
	The River Stour, Suffolk
	View of Edinburgh, Scotland
	Beach near Cromer
	Portrait of Mrs. Edwards	1818	Rhode Island School of Design Museum
	Coast Scene Near Brighton	1824	Detroit Institute of Arts
	The Glebe Farm	1827	Detroit Institute of Arts
	Weymouth Bay	1824
	Paysage, esquisse	1818	Collection of paintings of the Palais des Beaux-Arts de Lille
	Harnham Ridge from Archdeacon Fisher's House, Salisbury	1829	National Gallery of Ireland
	Portrait of a Child with a Dog		National Gallery of Ireland
	Arundel Mill and Castle	1837	Toledo Museum of Art
	Study for “The Leaping Horse” (View on the...)		Saint Louis Art Museum
	Sophia Lloyd and Child	18th Century	Worcester Art Museum
	Portrait Of James Lloyd	1806	Birmingham Museums Trust
	Harwich Lighthouse	1800s	Birmingham Museums Trust
	Study of Clouds - Evening, August 31st, 1822.	1822	Birmingham Museums Trust
