= 1819 in art =

Events in the year 1819 in art.

== Events ==
- 3 May – The Royal Academy Exhibition of 1819 opens at Somerset House in London.
- 25 August to 30 September – Paris Salon of 1819.
- November – The Museo del Prado opens to the public as the Royal Museum of Paintings and Sculptures in Madrid.
- unknown date – The Liverpool Royal Institution in England acquires 37 paintings from the collection of William Roscoe, creating the nucleus of what becomes the Walker Art Gallery collection.

== Works ==
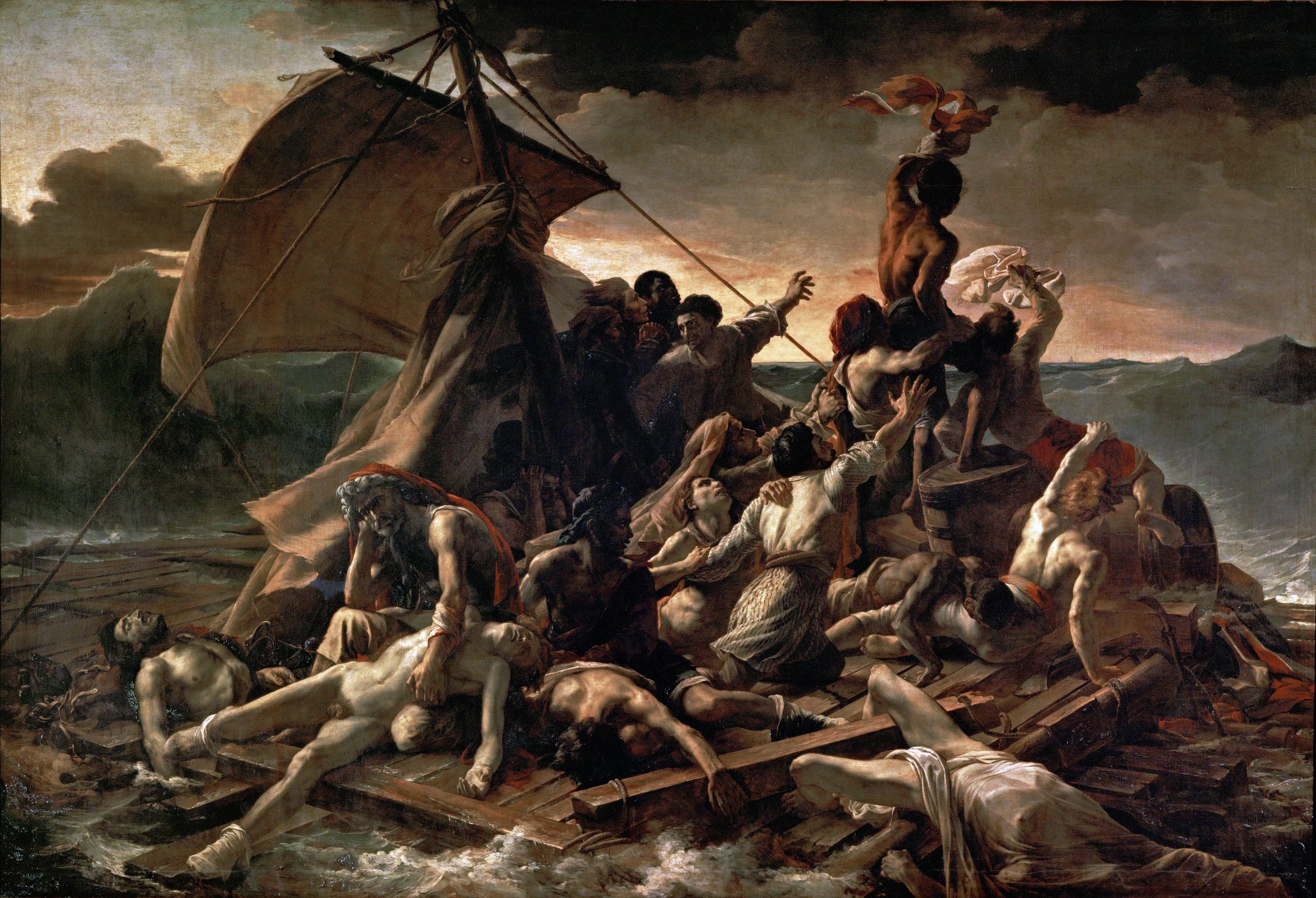
Théodore Géricault, The Raft of the Medusa, 1818–1819, Musée du Louvre, Paris

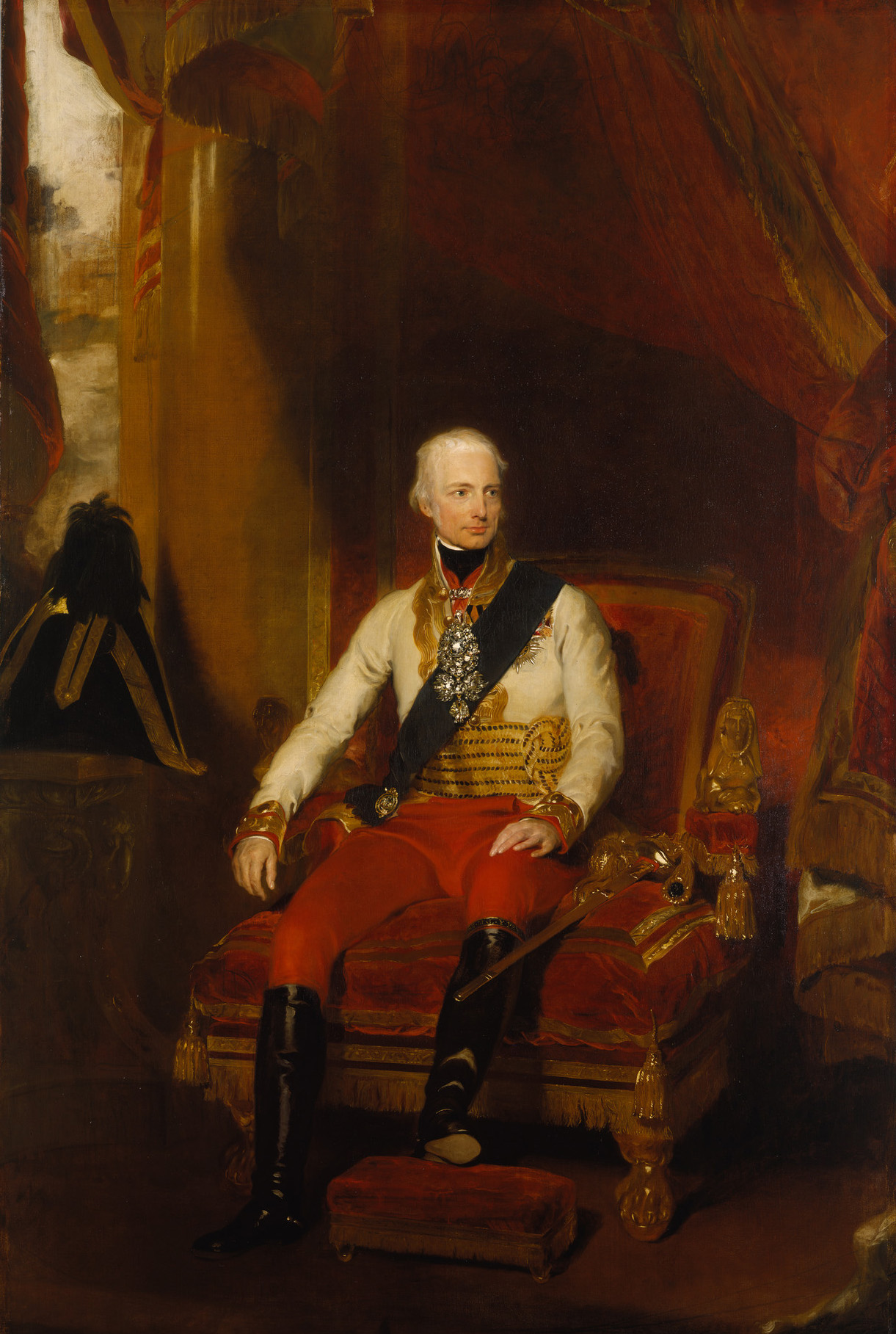
Thomas Lawrence, Portrait of Francis I of Austria.

- Washington Allston – The Flight of Florimell
- Vincenzo Camuccini – Portrait of Ferdinand I of the Two Sicilies
- John Constable – The Gathering Storm
- Marie Ellenrieder – Self-portrait as a painter
- John Flaxman – Statue of Sir John Moore
- Caspar David Friedrich – On a Sailing Ship
- Théodore Géricault – The Raft of the Medusa (Le Radeau de la Méduse)
- Anne-Louis Girodet de Roussy-Trioson – Pygmalion and Galatea
- Francisco Goya
  - The Madhouse
  - Portrait of Juan Antonio Cuervo
  - A Procession of Flagellants
  - A Village Bullfight
- Jean-Baptiste Paulin Guérin – Christ on the Knees of the Virgin
- Louis Hersent – Abdication of Gustavus Vasa (destroyed in 1848)
- Jean-Auguste-Dominique Ingres –
  - Gianciotto Discovers Paolo and Francesca
  - Niccolò Paganini
- Jérôme-Martin Langlois – Generosity of Alexander
- Thomas Lawrence
  - Portrait of Archduke Charles
  - Portrait of Francis I of Austria
  - Portrait of Lord Clanwilliam
  - Portrait of Napoleon II
  - Portrait of Prince Schwarzenberg
  - Portrait of Pope Pius VII
  - Portrait of Selina Meade
- Louis-François Lejeune – Attack on a large convoy at Salinas
- John Martin – The Fall of Babylon
- Samuel Morse – Portrait of James Monroe
- James Northcote – Edmund Kean as Brutus
- Joseph Paelinck – William I of the Netherlands
- Thomas Phillips – Portrait of the Earl of Durham
- Pierre Paul Prud'hon – The Dream of Happiness
- Henry Raeburn – Francis MacNab, The MacNab
- Pierre Révoil – Joan of Arc Imprisoned in Rouen
- Edward Villiers Rippingille – The Post Office
- Bertel Thorvaldsen – Christ and the Twelve Apostles
- John Trumbull – Declaration of Independence
- J. M. W. Turner
  - England: Richmond Hill, on the Prince Regent's Birthday
  - Entrance of the Meuse
- Horace Vernet
  - Massacre of the Mamelukes
  - The Dog of the Regiment Wounded
  - The Wounded Trumpeter

== Births ==
- January 6 – Baldassare Verazzi, Italian painter (died 1886)
- January 9 – William Powell Frith, English genre painter (died 1909)
- February 8 – John Ruskin, English artist and critic (died 1900)
- February 16 – Sophia Isberg, Swedish woodcut artist (died 1875)
- February 23 – John Webb Singer, English art founder and collector (died 1904)
- March 20 – Roger Fenton, English photographer (died 1869)
- June 3 – Johan Jongkind, Dutch painter (died 1891)
- June 10 – Gustave Courbet, French painter (died 1877)
- June 16 – Thomas Skinner, English etcher (poisoned 1881)
- June 23 – Henry Peters Gray, American portrait painter (died 1877)
- August 11 – Martin Johnson Heade, American painter (died 1904)
- June 28 – Henri Harpignies, French landscape painter (died 1916)
- September 20 – Théodore Chassériau, French painter (died 1856)
- December 6 – Nicholas Joseph Crowley, Irish portrait painter (died 1857)
- December 19 – Arthur Gilbert, English landscape painter (died 1895)
- date unknown – Edwin Hayes, British marine watercolourist (died 1904)

== Deaths ==
- January 15 – Gustav Philipp Zwinger, German painter and etcher (born 1779)
- February 16 – Pierre-Henri de Valenciennes, French painter (born 1750)
- March 4 – Johann Nepomuk della Croce, Austrian painter (born 1736)
- May 2 – Mary Moser, English painter (born 1744)
- May 10 – Mariano Salvador Maella, Spanish painter and engraver (born 1739)
- May 19 – Archibald Skirving, Scottish portrait painter (born 1749)
- May 21 – Dionys van Dongen, Dutch painter (born 1748)
- June 23 – Prosper-Gabriel Audran, French engraver, lawyer and academic (born 1744)
- July 10 – Pierre-Simon-Benjamin Duvivier, French engraver of coins and medals (born 1730)
- July 31 – Jurriaan Andriessen, Dutch decorative painter (born 1742)
- August – Paolo Borroni, Italian painter of the Neoclassical style (born 1749)
- August 1 – Pierre-Adrien Pâris, French architect, painter and designer (born 1745)
- August 27 – John Lewin, English-born Australian artist (born 1770)
- September 15 – Johann Georg Edlinger, Austrian court painter (born 1741)
- October 8 – William Beilby, English glassworker and enameller (born 1740)
- November 2 – Edward Bird, English genre painter (born 1772)
- November 5 – Alexander Kucharsky, Polish portrait painter (born 1741)
- November 11 – Moses Griffith, Welsh draughtsman, engraver and water colourist (born 1749)
- December 3 – Johann Conrad Felsing, German topographer and engraver using stippling (born 1766)
- date unknown
  - Wojciech Kucharski, Polish sculptor and mason (born 1741)
  - Anna Sibylla Sergell, textile artist of the royal Swedish court (born 1733)
  - Gustava Johanna Stenborg, Swedish embroiderer and textile artiste (born 1776)
