= The White Horse (Constable) =

Painting by John Constable

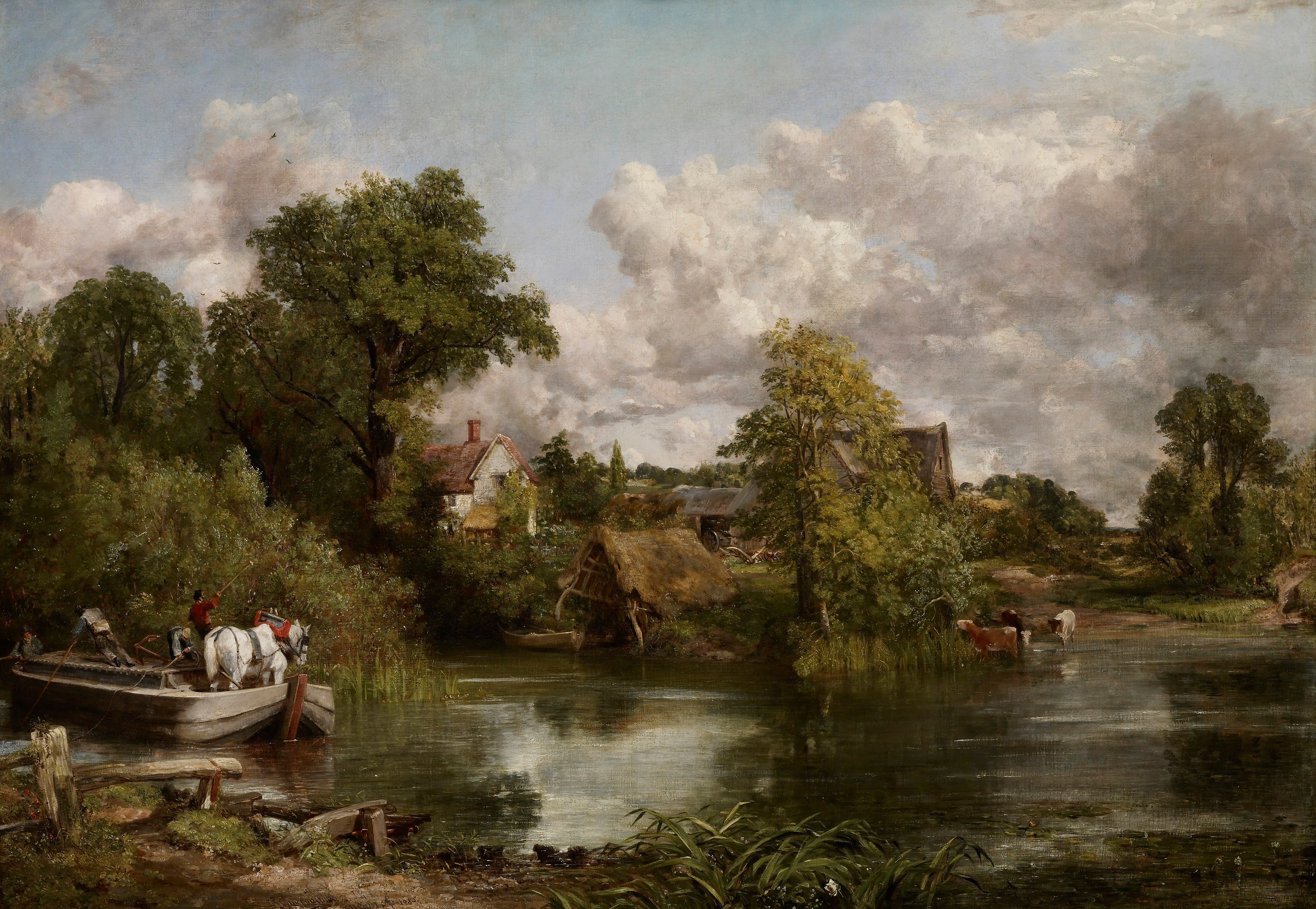
- Artist: John Constable
- Year: 1819
- Medium: Oil on canvas
- Dimensions: 131.4 cm × 188.3 cm (51.7 in × 74.1 in)
- Location: Frick Collection, New York City

The White Horse is an oil-on-canvas landscape painting by the English artist John Constable. It was completed in 1819 and is now in the Frick Collection in New York City.

The painting marked a vital turning point in the artist's career. It was the first in a series of six so called '‘six-footers’', depicting scenes on the River Stour, which includes his celebrated work The Hay Wain. The subject of the painting is a tow-horse being ferried across the river in Flatford, just below the Lock, at a point where the towpath switches banks.

It was first exhibited at the Royal Academy Exhibition of 1819.

== Critical reception ==
The painting attracted more attention than any of Constable's previous works. A key reason was its large size for its subject matter. Six feet was not an unprecedented size for a painting; many other paintings were wider or taller. Both pictures by J.M.W. Turner at the same exhibition were substantially the same or of a much longer width; Entrance of the Meuse was 5 ft. 8 in. wide and England: Richmond Hill, on the Prince Regent's Birthday was 11 feet wide, but their subjects were not a tranquil countryside scene. However, paintings of this size were reserved for more 'important' subjects, such as historical, religious or mythological topics. Even if most of the painting consisted of landscape, small human figures would relate them to one of those categories.

"The narrative of The White Horse is a low-key bit of river life in graphic and believable detail. [...] For the first time, an artist was using extra-ordinary proportions for the most ordinary of English scenes," observes Moorby. "He was unmasking beauty within the banal, using naturalism to underscore authenticity and truthfulness. He reproduced familiarity along monumental lines, augmenting the homely details without compromising any of his singularity of style."

The painting marks a key moment in Constable's career: it was the first time he was compared to Turner and so, even though Turner was an accomplished and famous artist at the time and Constable an unknown painter, it marks the starting point of the comparison of their works by the critics.

The White Horse was the first Constable painting that attracted media attention and from the start, he was compared with Turner, which later on sparked Turner's very competitive nature.

Robert Hunt, the art critic of the weekly The Examiner, compared The White Horse to Turner's imposing England: Richmond Hill, on the Prince Regent's Birthday:

Of a very different style [than Richmond Hill], though equally successful of its kind, is Mr CONSTABLE’s, who though he also is still far from pencilling with Nature’s precision, gives her more contracted features, such as a wood or a windmill on a river, with more of her aspect. He does not give a sentiment, a soul to the exterior of Nature, as Mr TURNER does; he does not at all exalt the spectator’s mind, which Mr TURNER eminently does, but he gives her outward look, her complexion and physical countenance, with more exactness. He has none of the poetry of Nature like Mr TURNER, but he has more of her portraiture. His Scene on the River Stour is indeed more approaching to the outward lineament and look of trees, water, boats, &c., than any of our landscape painters.

In his biographical book that tracks and analyzes the work of both artists, Moorby underscores the importance of this critique: "By praising the ‘portraiture’ of Nature –the ability to reveal the true face of the natural world– as something of equal value to Turner’s imaginative ‘poetry’, Hunt was establishing a precedent that would become a critical commonplace", adding, "[In 1819] a new decade was dawning: one that would witness the rise of John Constable."

== History ==
The painting is based on sketches that Constable produced in his native Suffolk, but the full composition was finished between 1818-1819 during his time in London. The painting was completed and exhibited at the Royal Exhibition in 1819, where it was well received. Constable was voted an Associate of the Royal Academy on the strength of it. The painting was purchased for 100 guineas by Constable's friend John Fisher, the Bishop of Salisbury, who would later commission his painting Salisbury Cathedral from the Bishop's Grounds. This purchase finally provided Constable with financial security and it’s arguable that without it, he may have given up painting altogether.

The White Horse was one of Constable’s favourite paintings. He commented in a letter to Fisher in 1826: "There are generally in the life of an artist perhaps one, two or three pictures, on which hang more than usual interest – this is mine."

In 1830, when Fisher was heavily indebted, he bought the painting back, also for 100 guineas. He would keep it for the rest of his life. After his death in 1837, the painting passed through the hands of various English collectors, before being brought to the United States by financier J. P. Morgan. It is now in the Frick Collection in New York City.

The full-size oil sketch for The White Horse is held by the National Gallery of Art in Washington, D.C.

== See also ==
- List of paintings by John Constable
- Stratford Mill
- The Hay Wain
- The Lock

== Bibliography ==
- Beckett, R.B. (1962), John Constable's Correspondence VI: The Fishers, Woodbridge: Boydell & Brewer Ltd, ISBN 9780900716096
- Johnson, Paul (1991), The Birth of the Modern: World Society 1815-1830, University of Michigan: HarperCollins, ISBN 9780060165741
