= Portrait of William Roscoe =

Painting by Martin Archer Shee

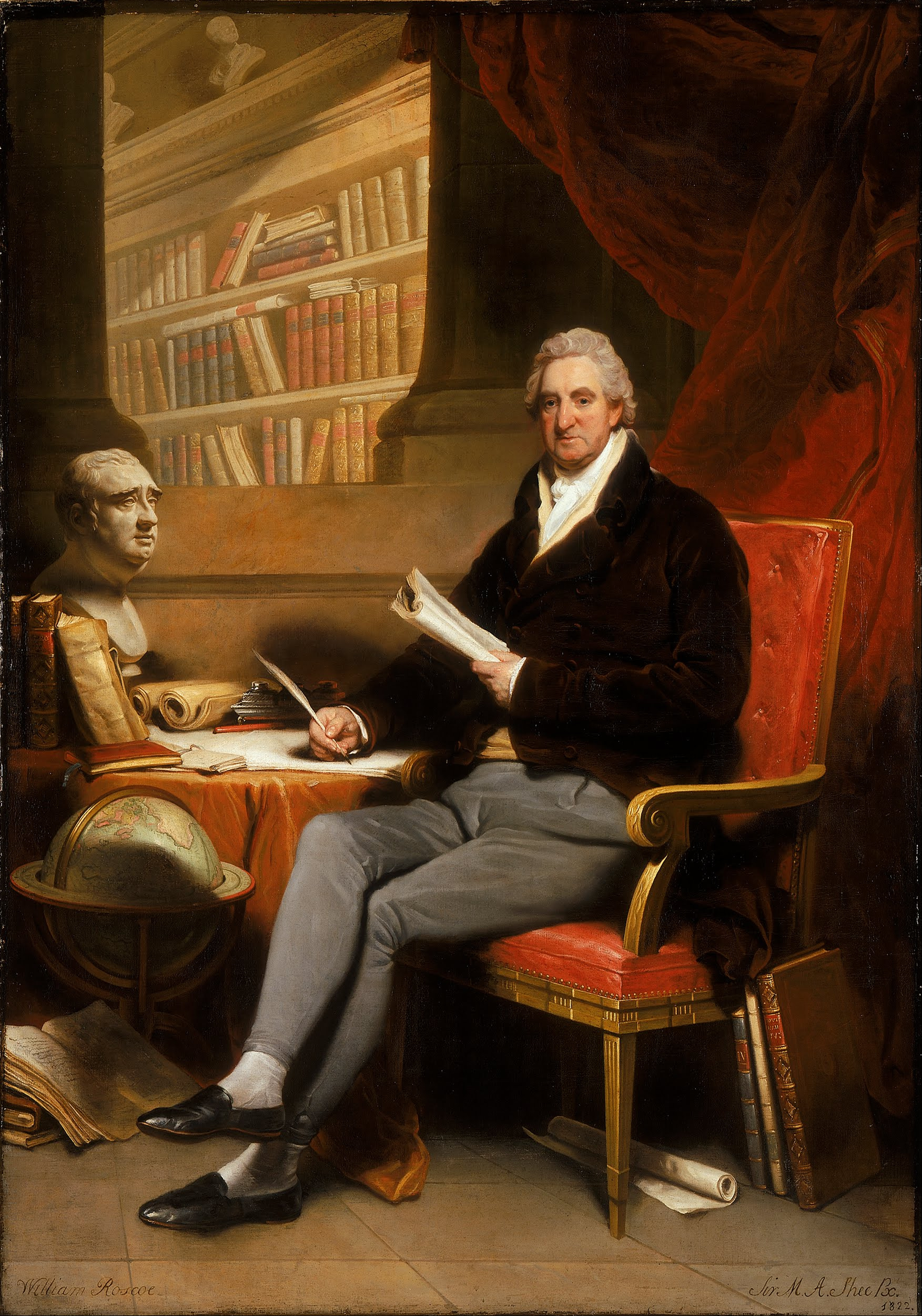
- Artist: Martin Archer Shee
- Year: 1815-1817
- Type: Oil on canvas, portrait painting
- Dimensions: 233 cm × 166.5 cm (92 in × 65.6 in)
- Location: Walker Art Gallery, Liverpool

Portrait of William Roscoe is a portrait painting by the Irish artist Martin Archer Shee in 1817. It depicts the lawyer and politician William Roscoe. A noted abolitionist, he was also known as an art collector, he is shown in his library with a bust of Charles James Fox, a gesture towards his own Whigs.

In 1830, the Dublin-born Martin Archer Shee was one of the leading portraitists of Regency Britain who succeeded his friend Thomas Lawrence as President of the Royal Academy. The painting was displayed at the Royal Academy Exhibition of 1817 at Somerset House in London. Archer Shee also submitted another portrait for the 1819 Exhibition, possibly a cartoon of this work. Today the painting is in the collection of the Walker Art Gallery in Liverpool.

== Bibliography ==
- Fletcher, Stella. Roscoe and Italy: The Reception of Italian Renaissance History and Culture in the Eighteenth and Nineteenth Centuries. Taylor & Francis, 2016.
