= Portrait of Augusta, Duchess of Cambridge =

Painting by William Beechey

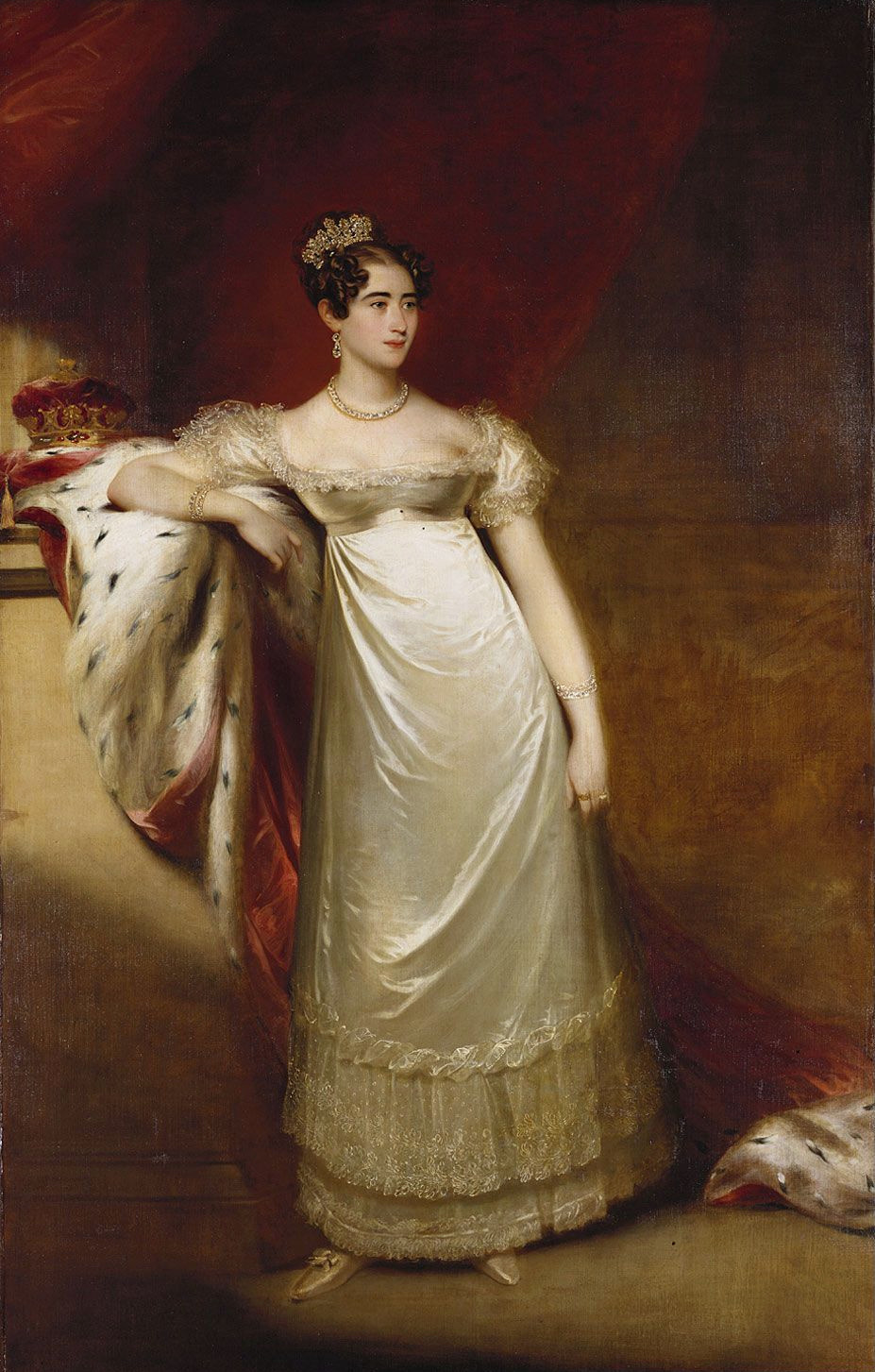
- Artist: William Beechey
- Year: 1818
- Type: Oil on canvas, portrait
- Dimensions: 239.7 cm × 148.9 cm (94.4 in × 58.6 in)
- Location: Royal Collection, London

Portrait of the Duchess of Cambridge is an oil on canvas full-length portrait painting by the English artist William Beechey of the German-born British royal Augusta, Duchess of Cambridge. It was created in 1818.

== History and description ==
Born in 1797, Augusta was a member of the ruling family of Hesse-Kassel, a principality in the German Confederation. The work was painted the year of her marriage to Prince Adolphus, Duke of Cambridge, the seventh son of George III. Following the death of the prospective future heir to the throne Princess Charlotte in 1817, several of the King's sons got married in order to secure the succession for the reigning House of Hanover. In March 1819 the couple produced a son George. Although he was born two months earlier, his cousin Victoria later took the throne as her father was an elder brother. Another slightly younger cousin George, Duke of Cumberland later succeeded to the throne of Hanover. Augusta lived for much of her life at Cambridge Cottage on Kew Green and was buried at St Anne's Church, Kew. Her granddaughter Mary of Teck married her cousin George V and the current line of the royal family therefore descends from Augusta.

The painting was shown at the Royal Academy's Summer Exhibition of 1819 at Somerset House. The work was commissioned by her husband at the time of their marriage. Beechey was an experienced portraitist by the time he depicted Augusta, having been a member of the Royal Academy since 1793. He depicts her in fashionable Regency style. He seems to deliberately copy the manner of his rival Thomas Lawrence, who was at the height of his fame. Three years later Beechey painted Augusta's husband's sister in law and niece in Victoria, Duchess of Kent with Princess Victoria. Both works are now in the Royal Collection, Augusta's painting having been acquired from the Grand Duke Paul of Russia by Mary of Teck.

== Bibliography ==
- Blunt, Anthony. The Pictures in the Collection of Her Majesty the Queen: The later Italian pictures. Phaidon, 1969.
- Pope-Hennesey, James. The Quest for Queen Mary. Hodder & Stoughton, 2018.
- Roberts, William. Sir William Beechey, R.A.. Duckworth and Company, 1907.
