= Royal Academy Exhibition of 1819 =

1819 art exhibition in London

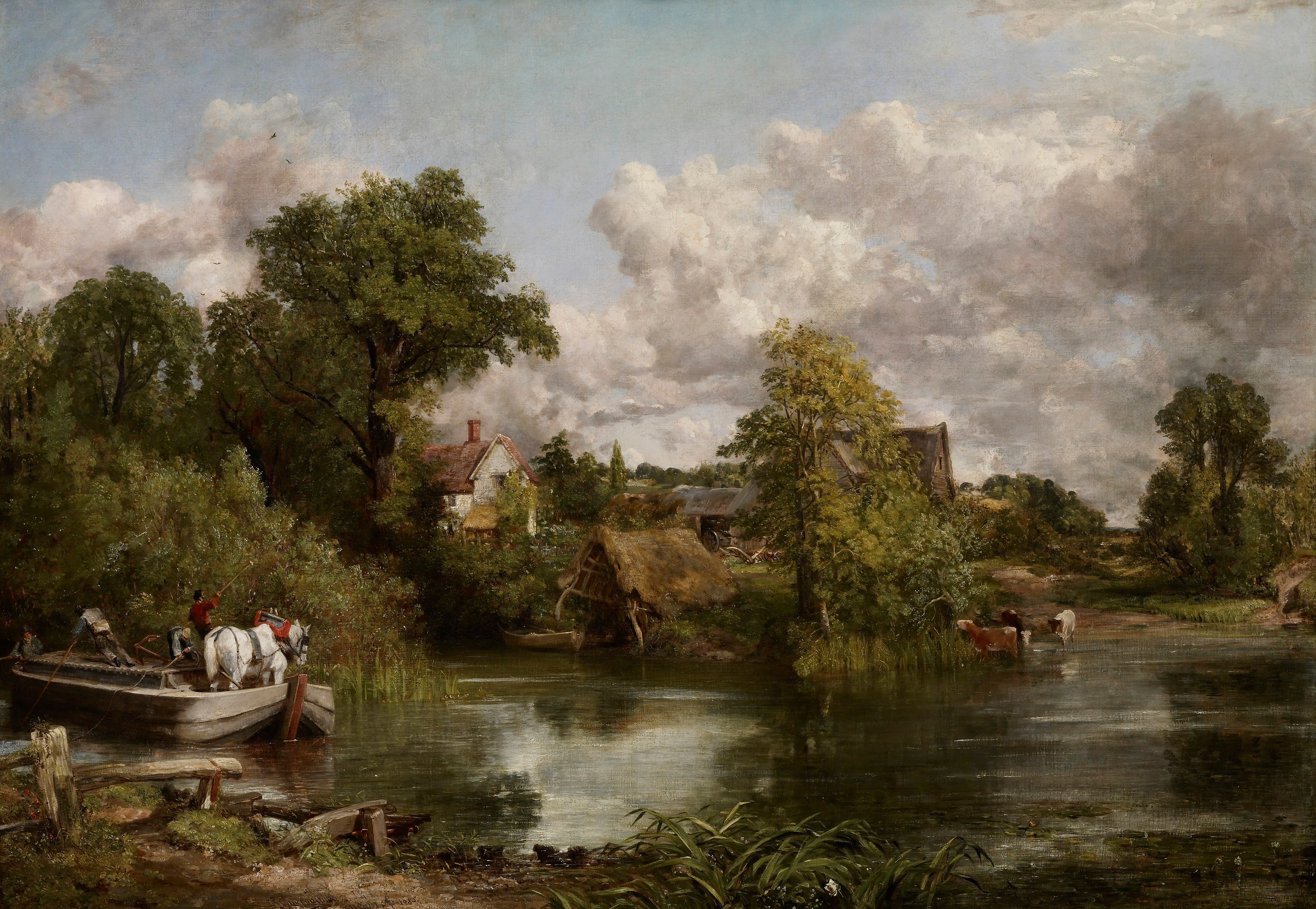
The White Horse by John Constable

The Royal Academy Exhibition of 1819 was the fifty first Summer Exhibition of the British Royal Academy of Arts. It was held at the academy's Somerset House headquarters in London from 3 May to 3 July 1819. It featured works by leading artists and architects of the Regency era. It marked the fiftieth anniversary of the inaugural Exhibition of 1769, although there was little public acknowledgement of this other than the striking of a commemorative medal.

J.M.W. Turner exhibited two notable works. His Richmond Hill on the Prince Regent's Birthday is a picturesque view of the River Thames from Richmond Hill featuring a celebration of the Prince Regent's birthday. By contrast, Entrance of the Meuse is a stormy seascape in which depicts a Dutch merchant ship stranded on a sandbank during rough weather. John Constable displayed the first of his "six-footers" The White Horse, a landscape painting featuring a view on the River Stour in his native Suffolk.

Britain's leading portrait painter Thomas Lawrence was absent on the Continent fulfilling a commission from the Prince Regent to produce picture of the leading European figures involved in the defeat of Napoleon and therefore displayed no paintings at the academy that year. A number of his rivals did have work on display including Thomas Phillips who exhibited a portrait of the Whig politician John Lambton and William Owen with a picture of Charles Abbott, the Lord Chief Justice.

Martin Archer Shee displayed his Portrait of William Roscoe featuring the Liverpool lawyer, art collector and abolitionist William Roscoe. William Beechey presented royal paintings including the Portrait of Augusta, Duchess of Cambridge, which consciously imitated the style of the fashionable Thomas Lawrence.

The American-born President of the Royal Academy exhibited one of his final works The Stolen Kiss. David Wilkie displayed the genre painting The Penny Wedding while Edward Villiers Rippingille of the Bristol School submitted The Post Office.

== Gallery ==
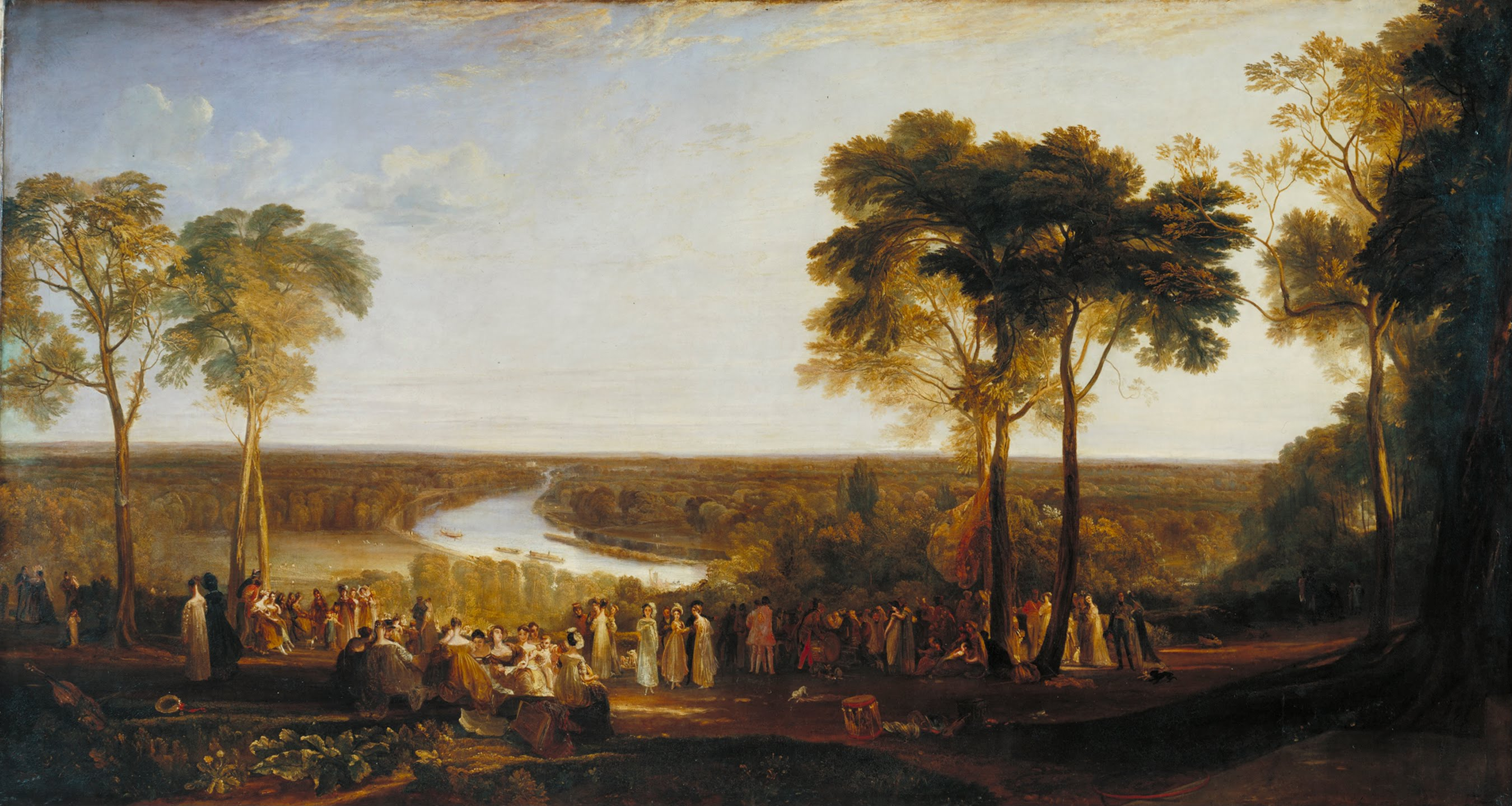
Richmond Hill on the Prince Regent's Birthday by J.M.W. Turner

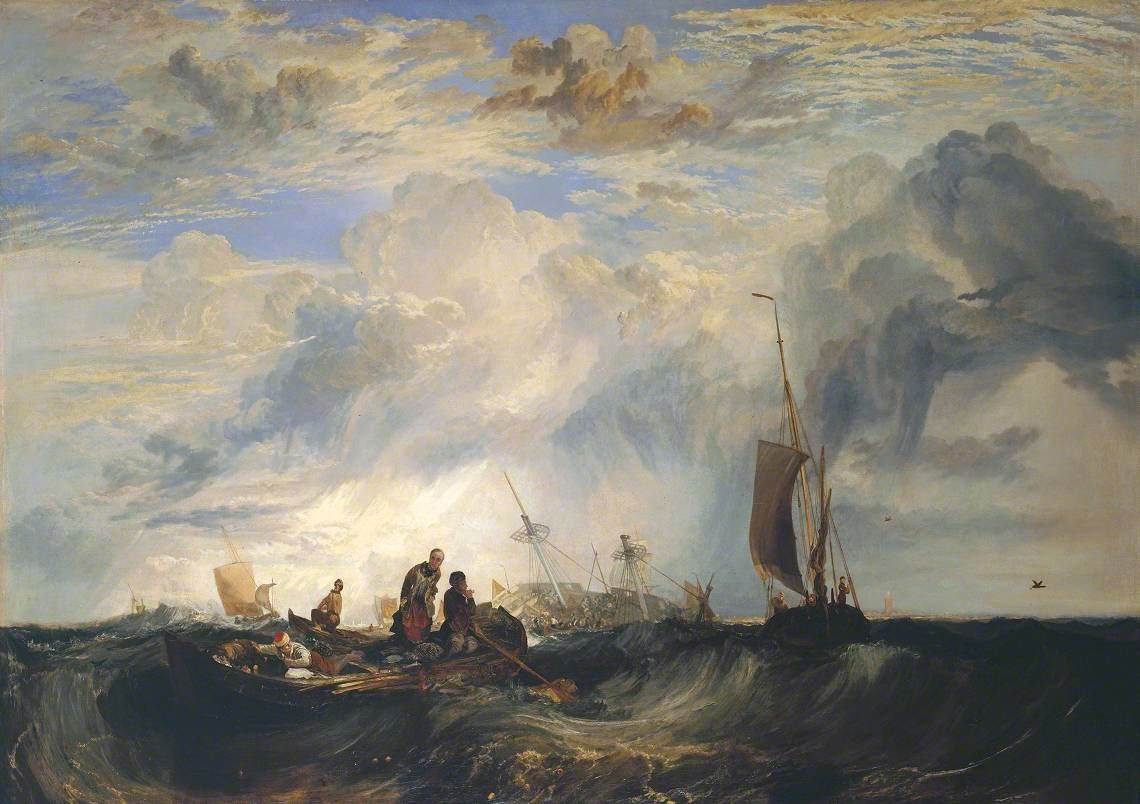
Entrance of the Meuse by J.M.W. Turner

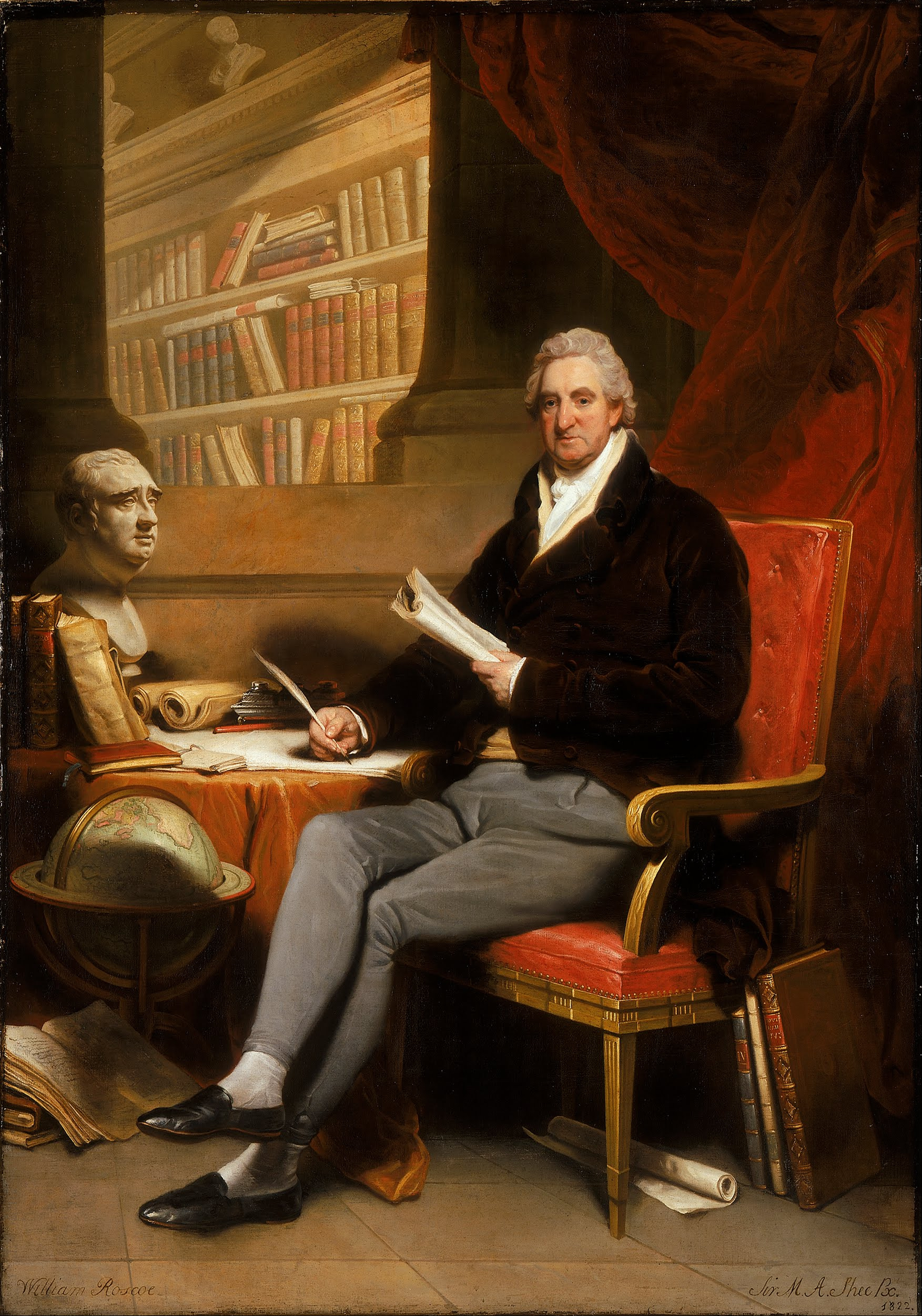
Portrait of William Roscoe by Martin Archer Shee

James Munro Macnabb by Martin Archer Shee

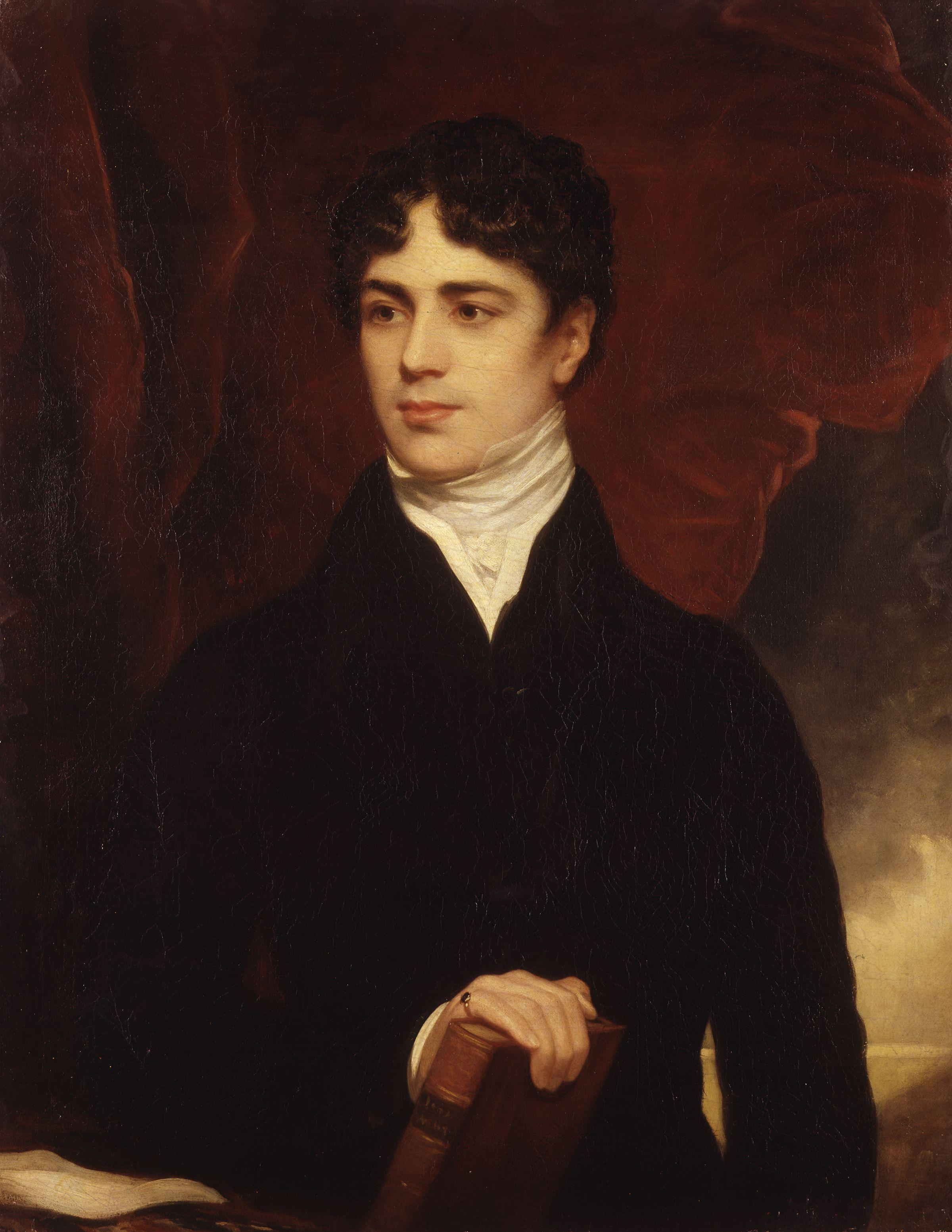
Portrait of the Earl of Durham by Thomas Phillips

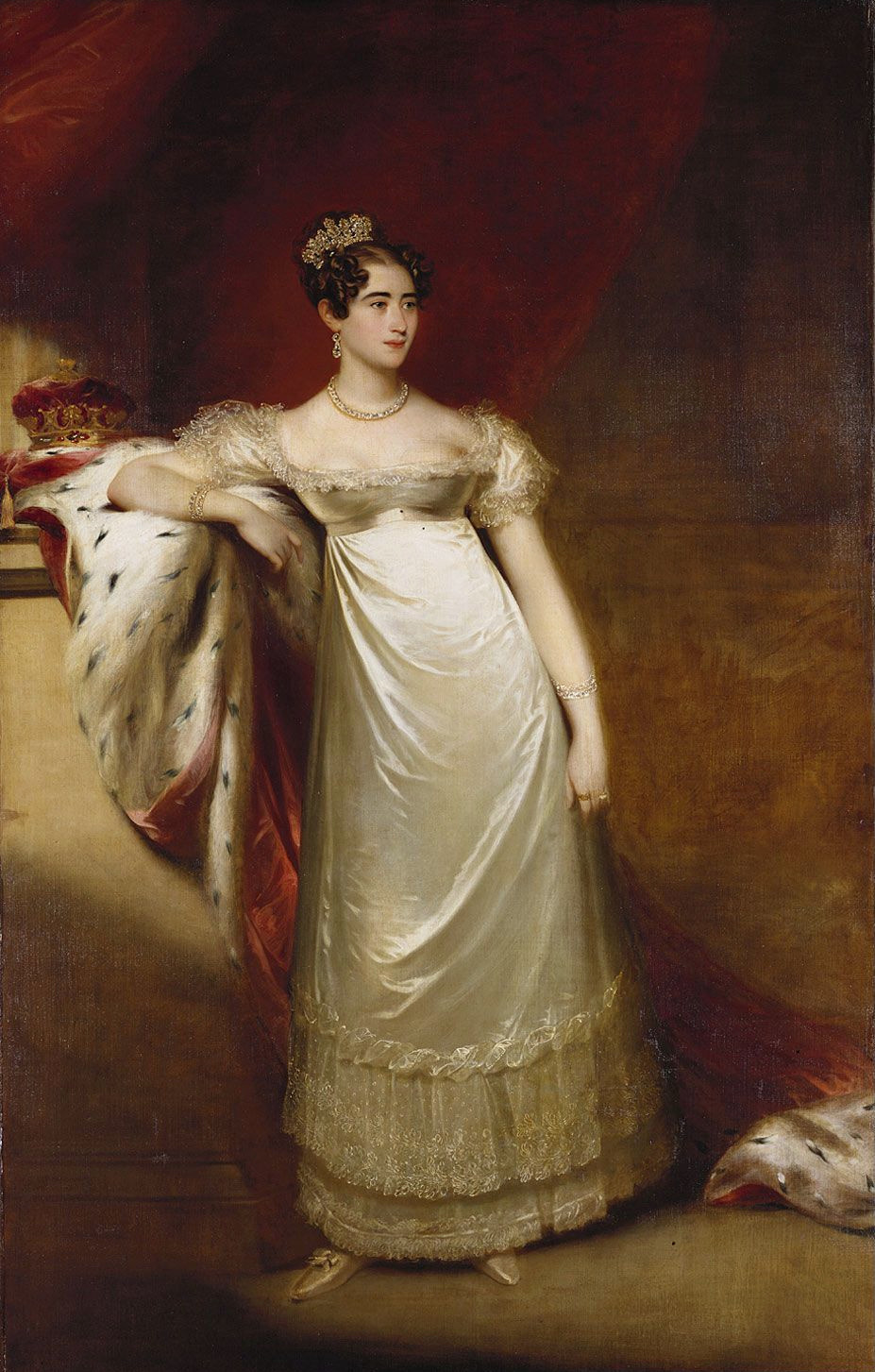
Portrait of Augusta, Duchess of Cambridge by William Beechey

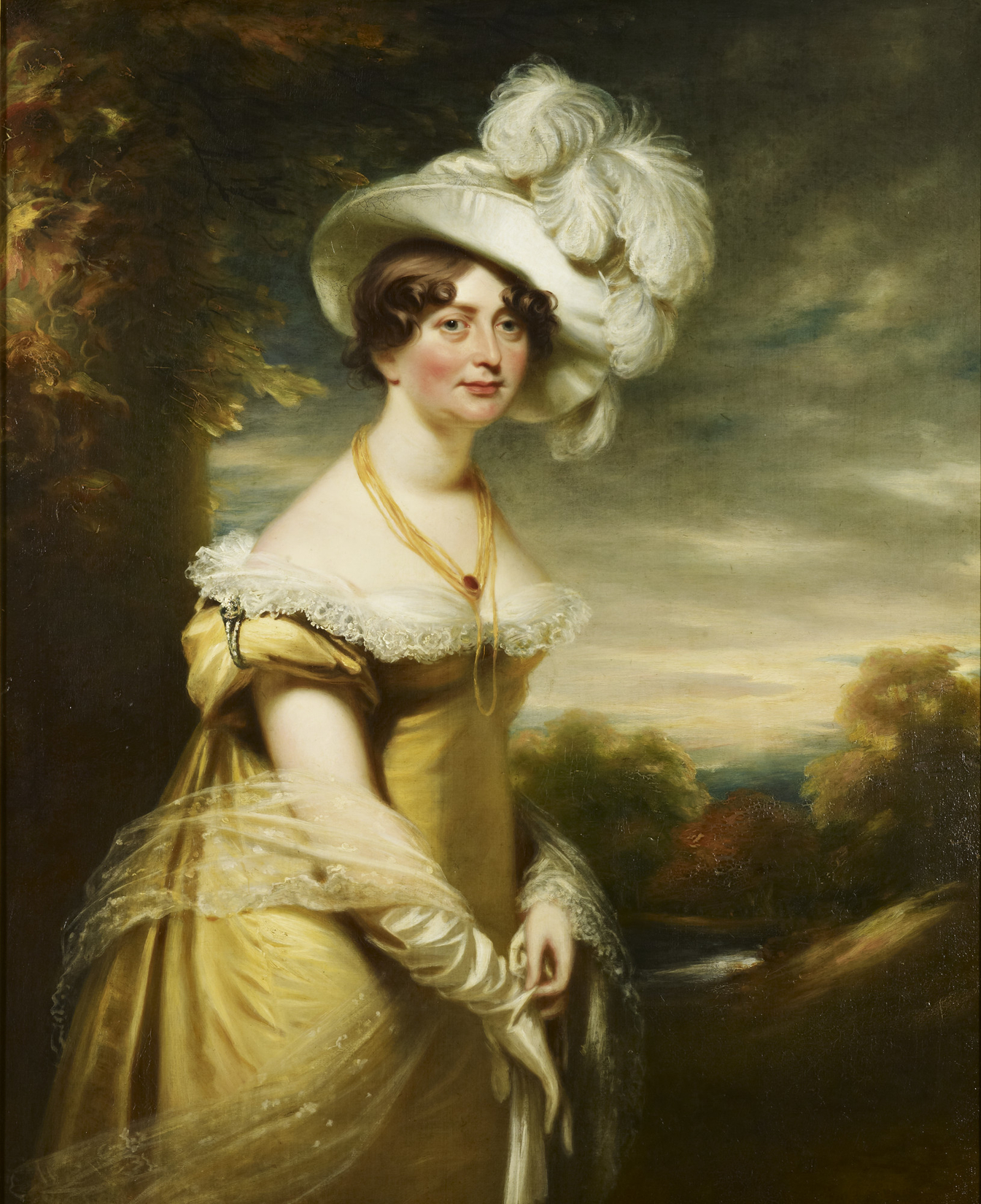
Princess Augusta Sophia by William Beechey

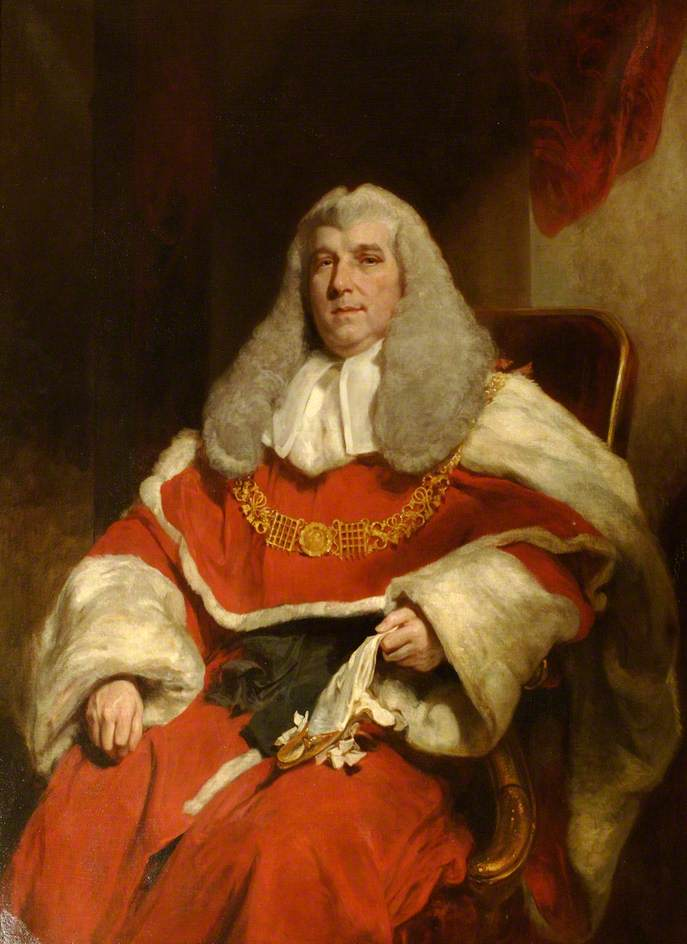
Charles Abbott by William Owen

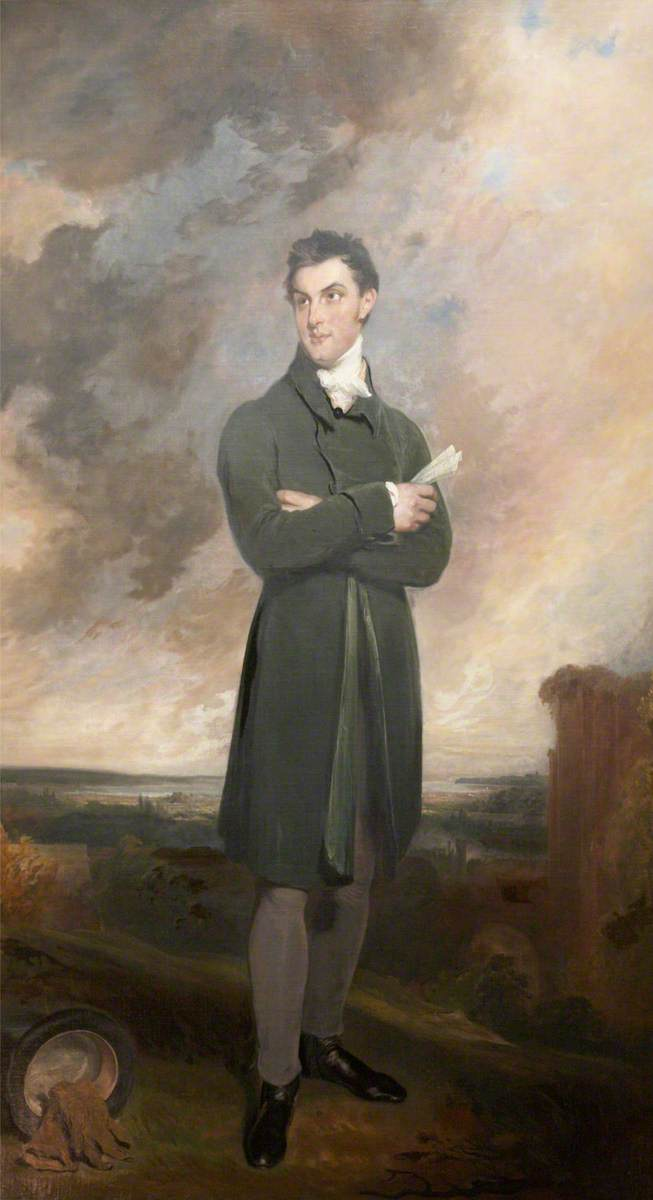
Thomas Dyke Acland by William Owen

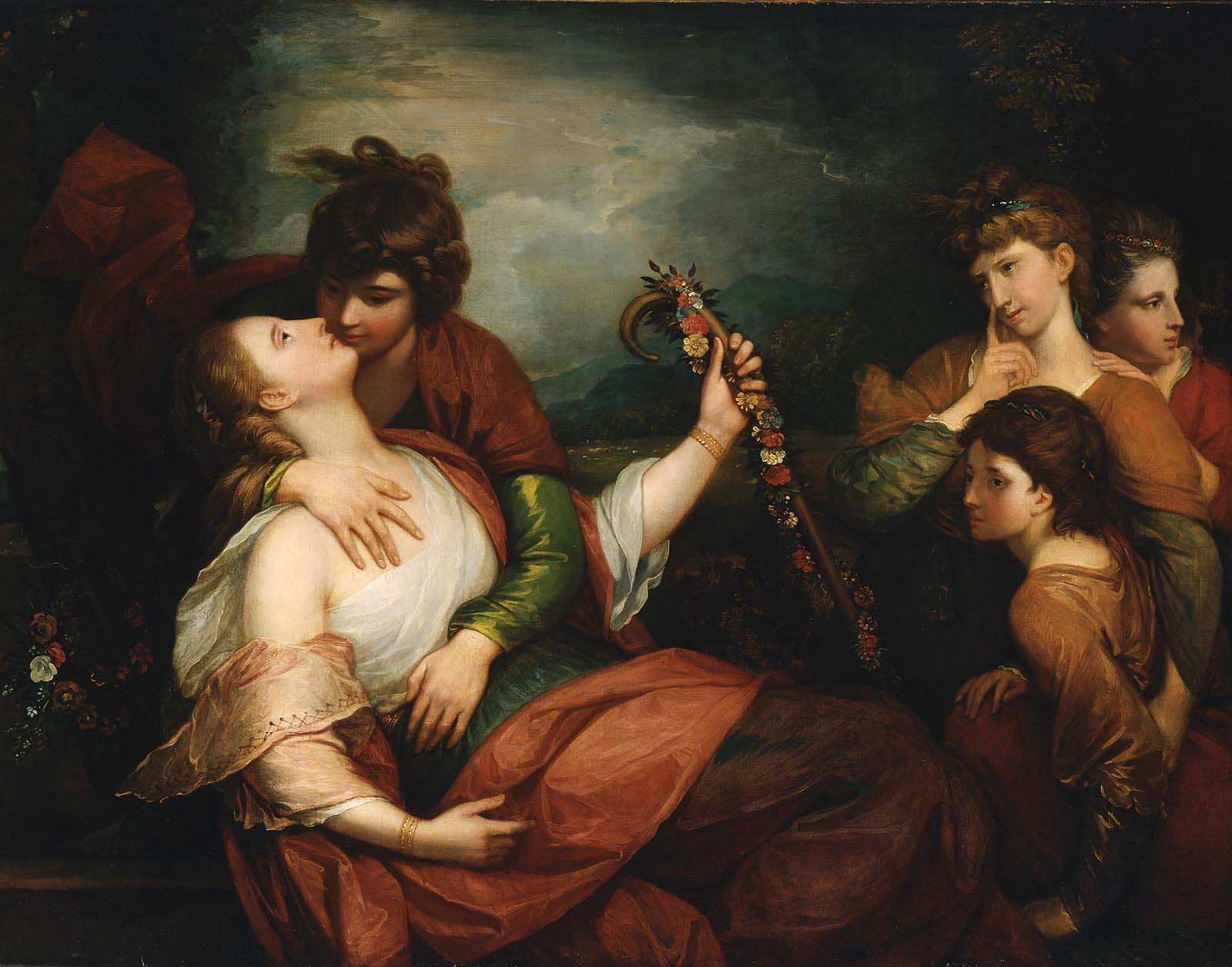
The Stolen Kiss by Benjamin West

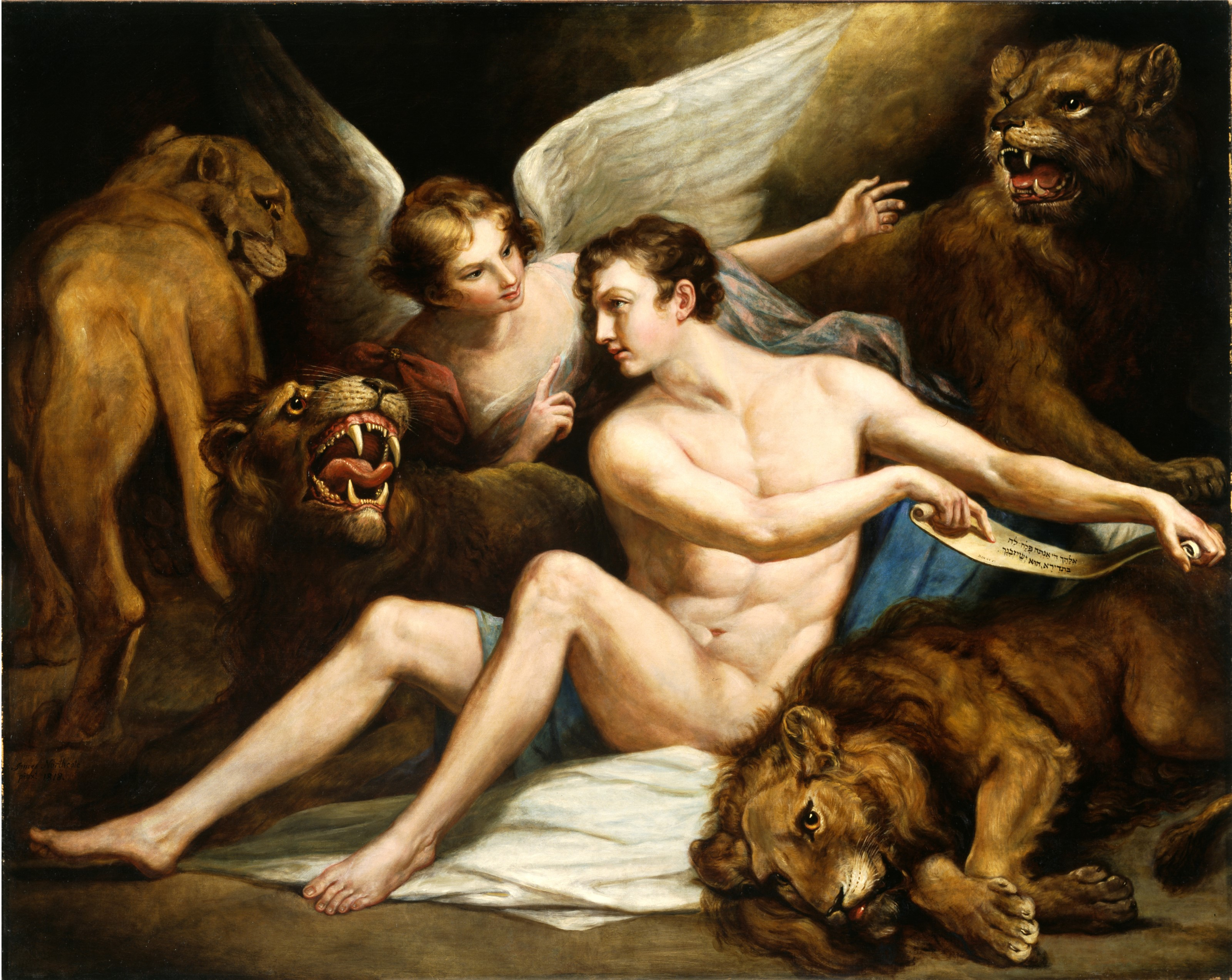
Daniel in the Lion's Den by James Northcote

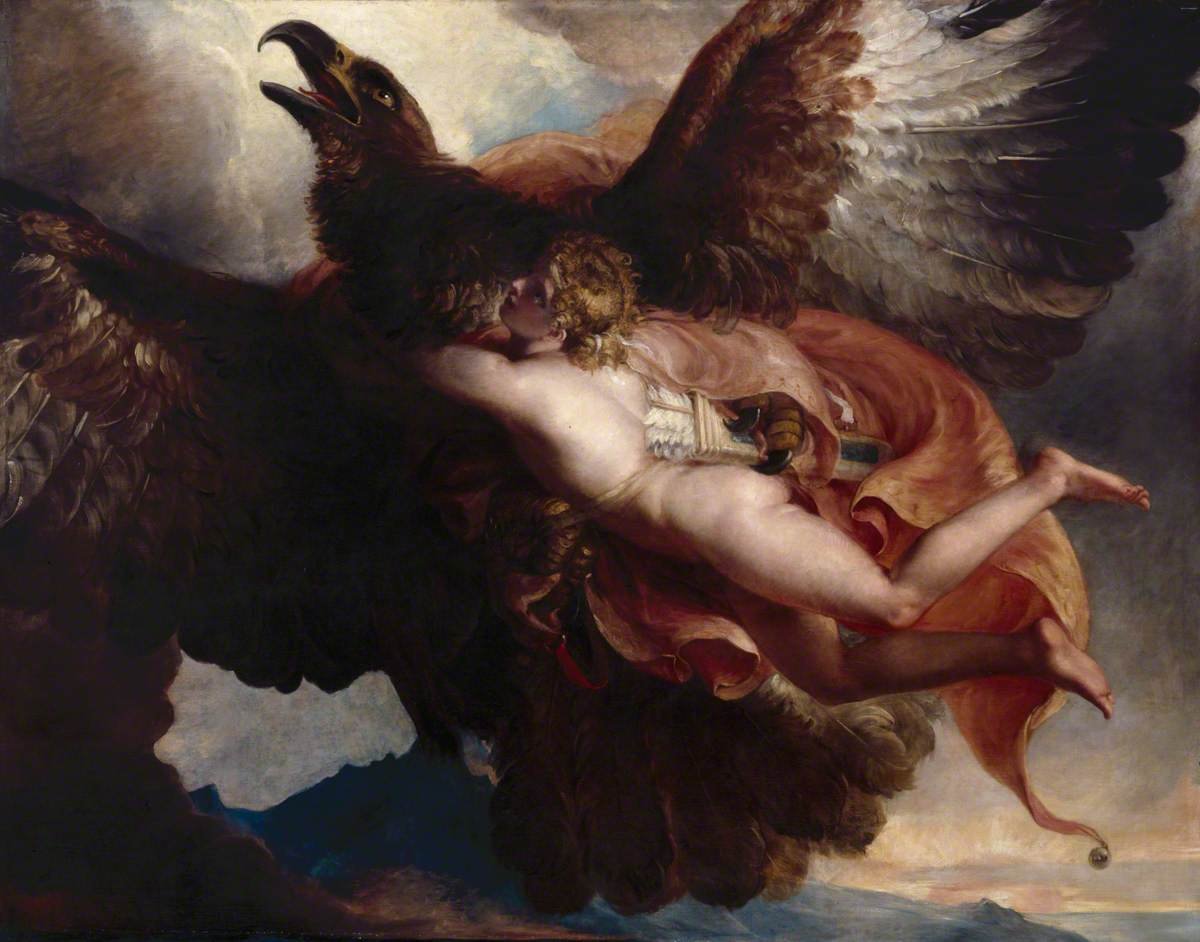
The Rape of Ganymede by William Hilton

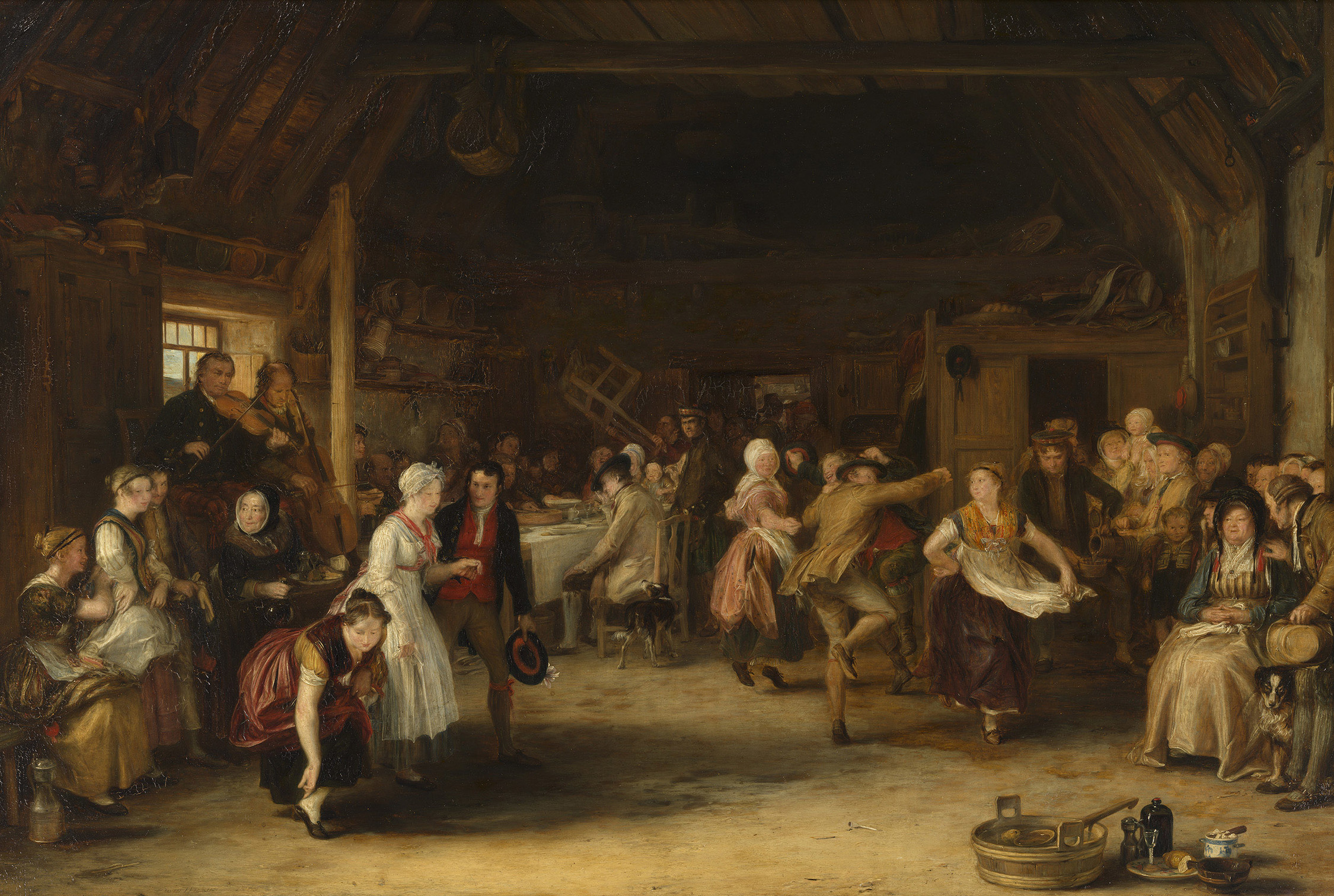
The Penny Wedding by David Wilkie

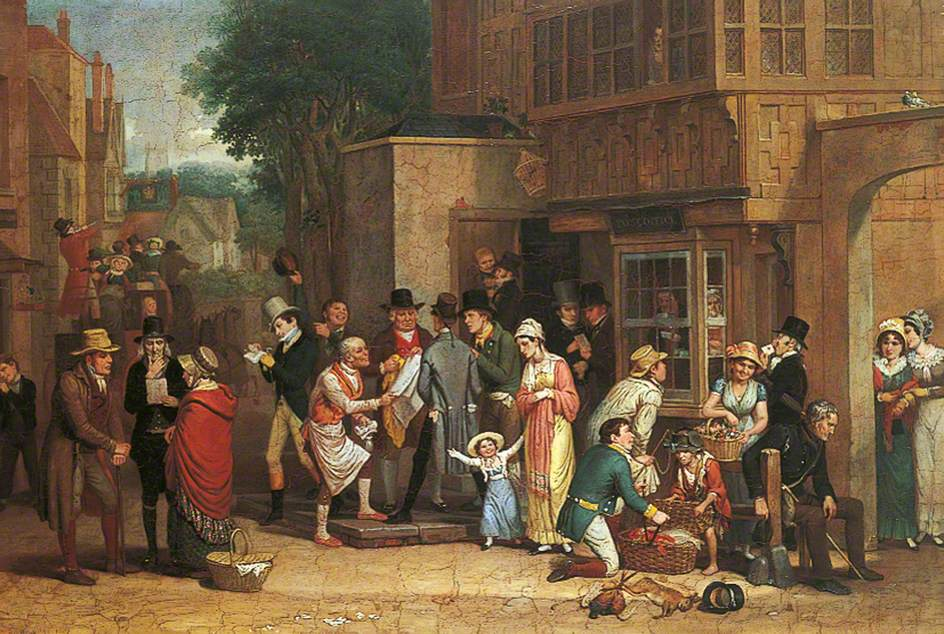
The Post Office by Edward Villiers Rippingille

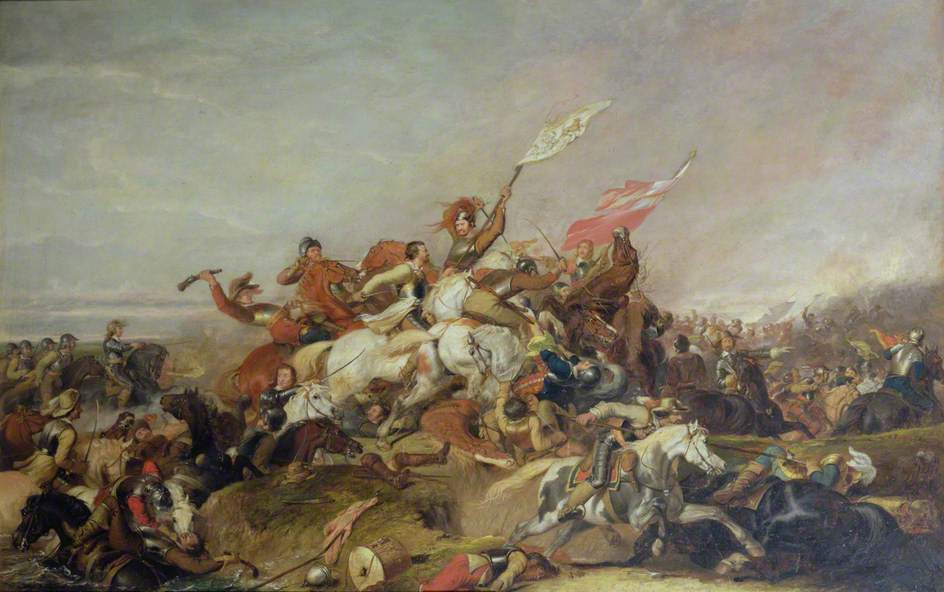
Marston Moor by Abraham Cooper

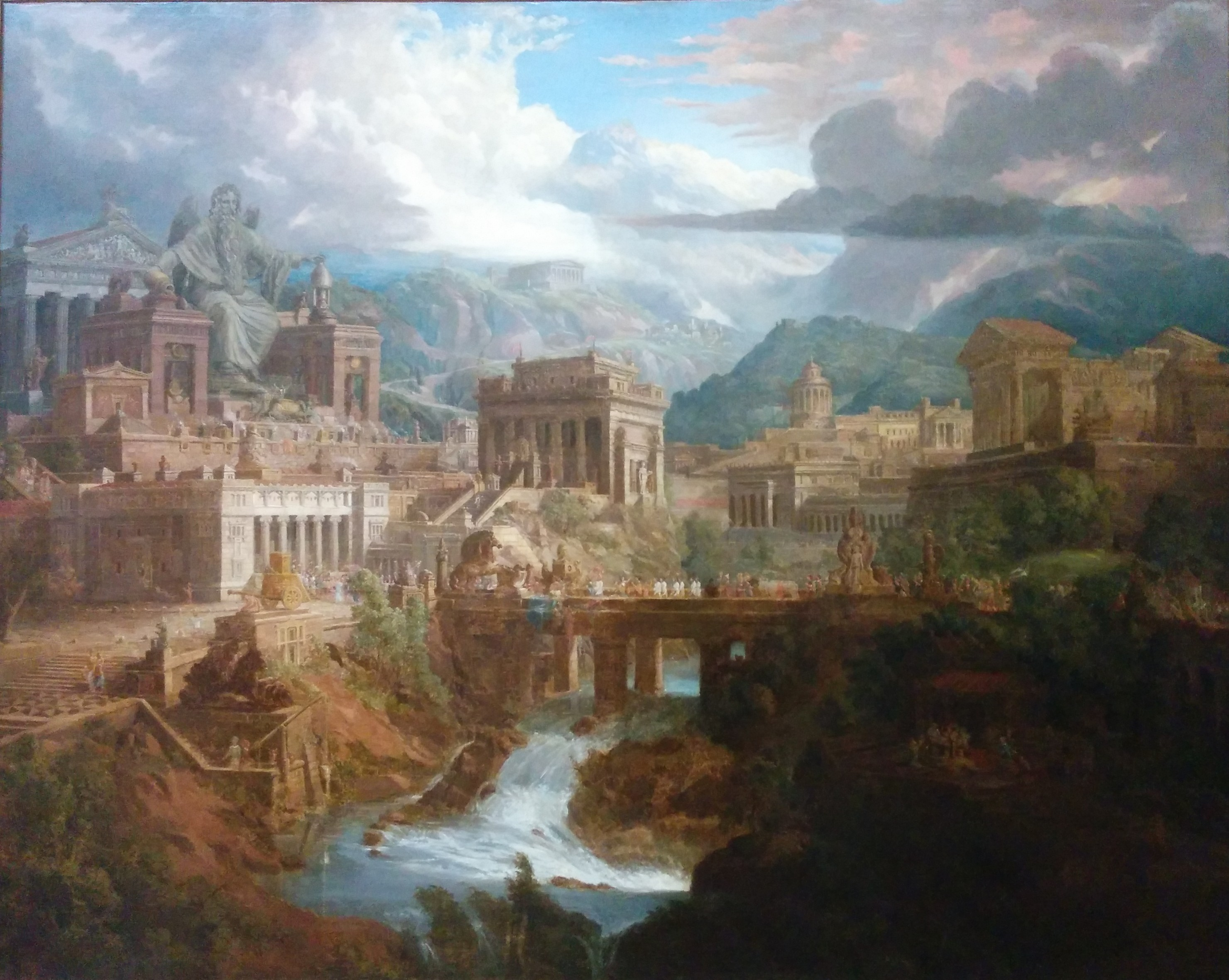
Jupiter Pluvius by Joseph Gandy

Lending a Bite by William Mulready

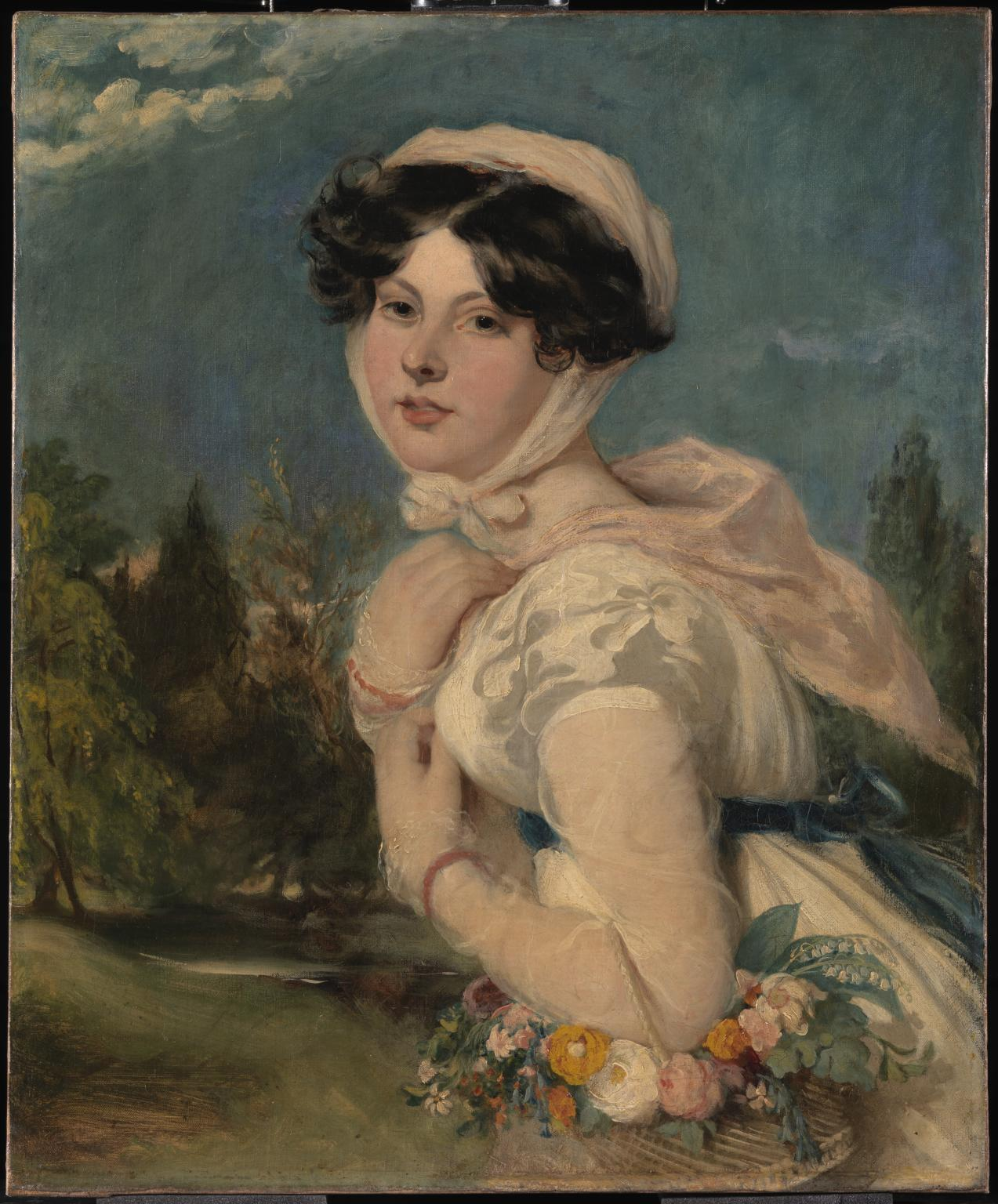
Mary Arabella Jay by William Etty

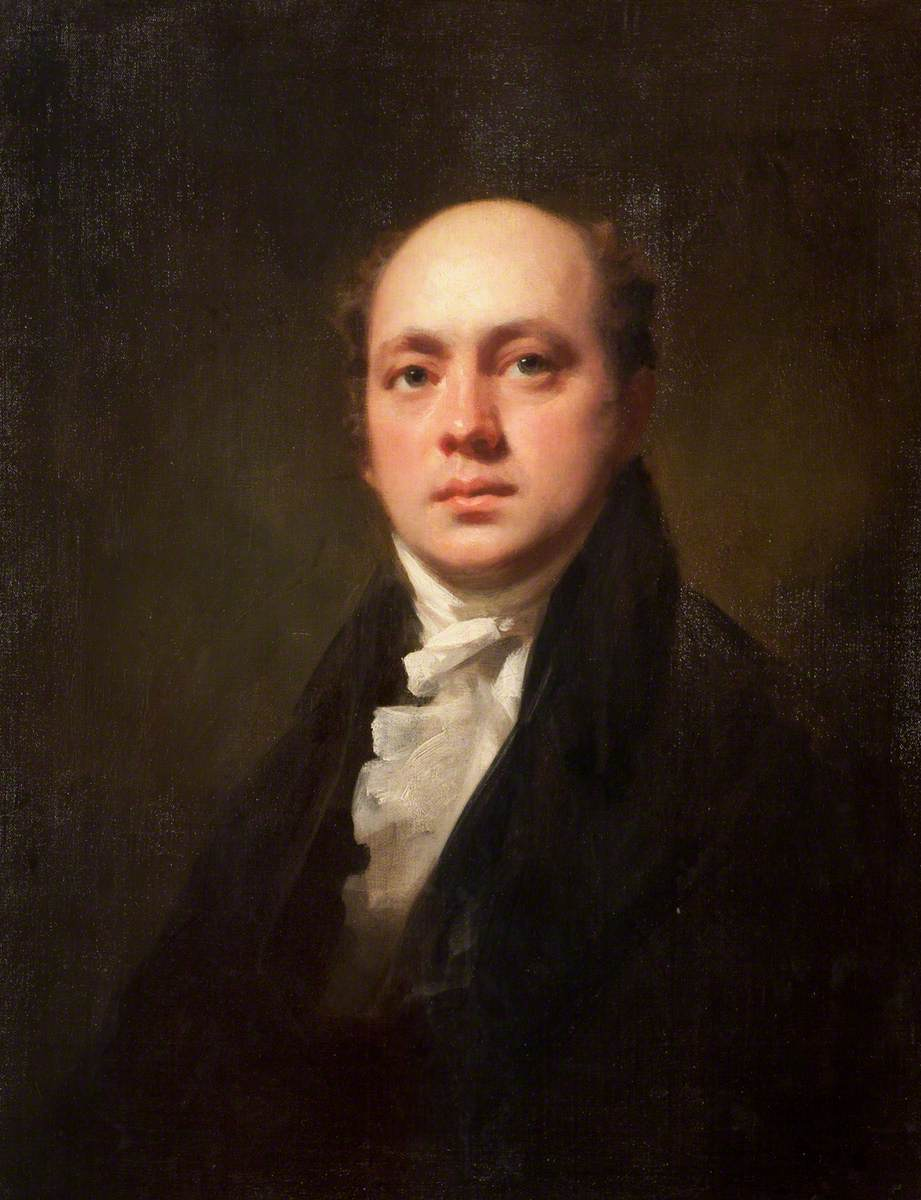
Francis Chantrey by Henry Raeburn

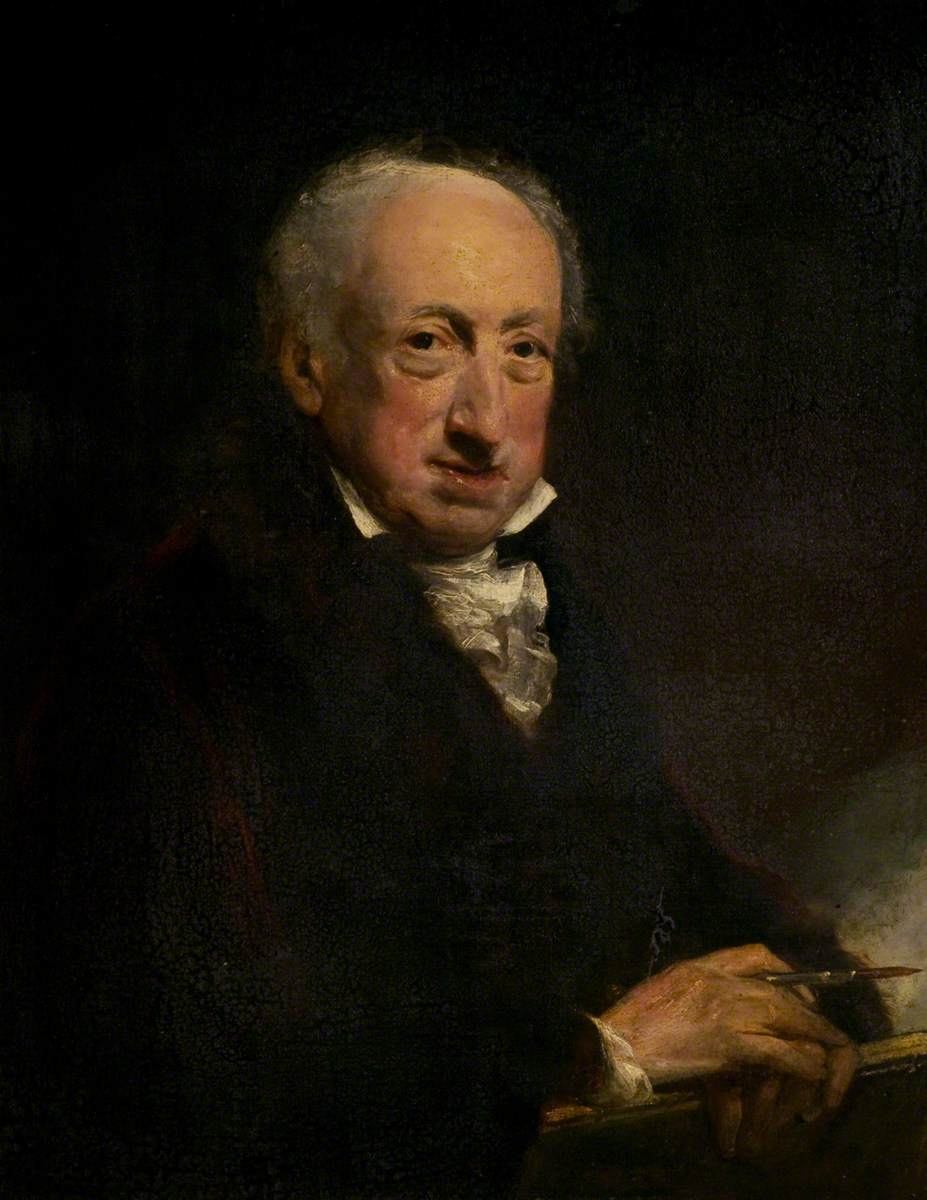
George Dance by John Jackson

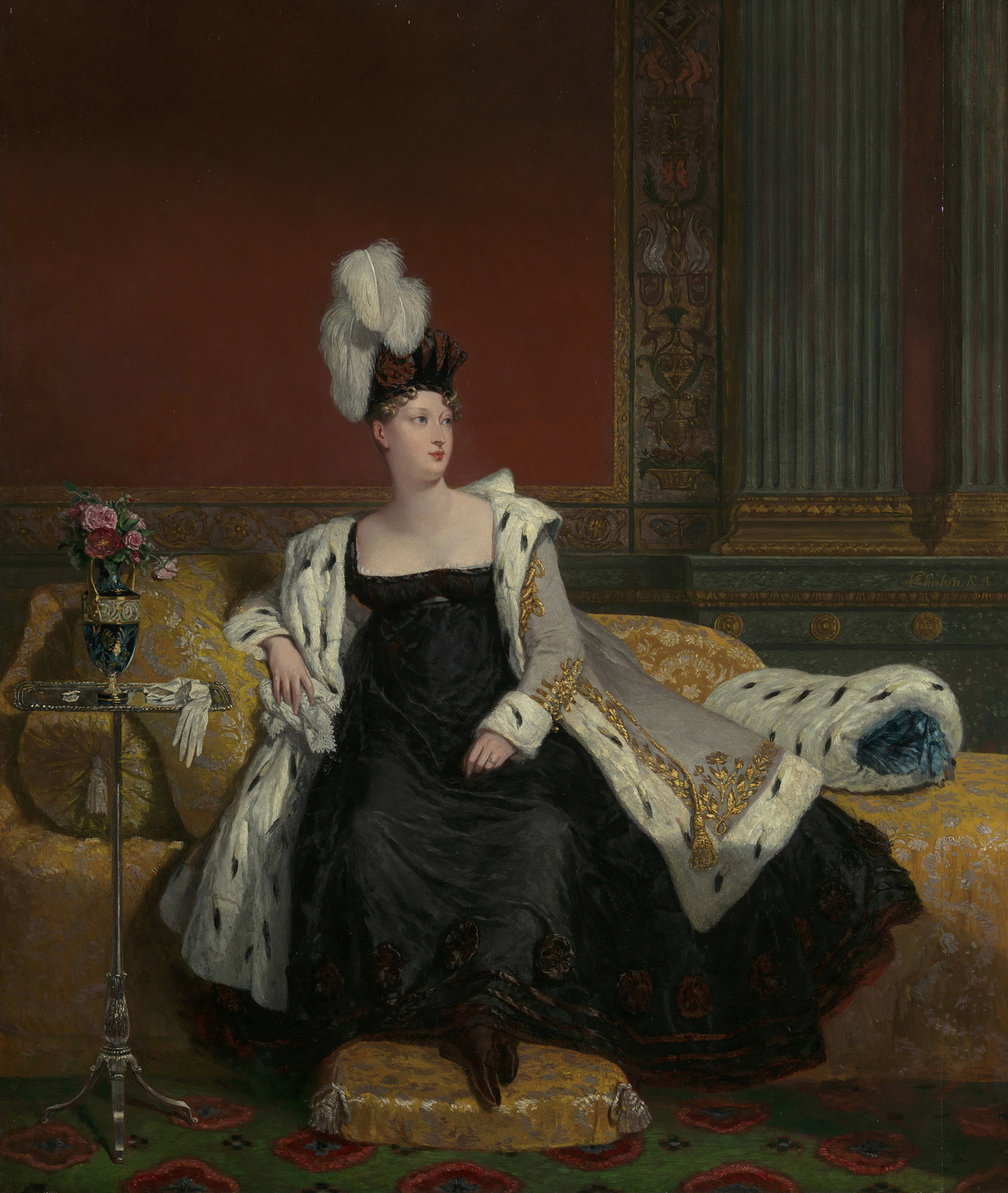
Princess Charlotte by Alfred Edward Chalon

== See also ==
- Salon of 1819, a French art exhibition held at the Louvre in Paris

== Bibliography ==
- Bailey, Anthony. J.M.W. Turner: Standing in the Sun. Tate Enterprises Ltd, 2013.
- Hamilton, James. Turner - A Life. Sceptre, 1998.
- Herrmann, Luke. J. M. W. Turner. Oxford University Press, 2007.
- Levey, Michael. Sir Thomas Lawrence. Yale University Press, 2005.
- Solkin, David H. Painting Out of the Ordinary: Modernity and the Art of Everyday Life in Early Nineteenth-century Britain. Yale University Press, 2009.
- Thornes, John E. John Constable's Skies: A Fusion of Art and Science. A&C Black, 1999.
- Tromans, Nicholas. David Wilkie: The People's Painter. Edinburgh University Press, 2007.
