= The Lock (Constable) =

Painting by John Constable

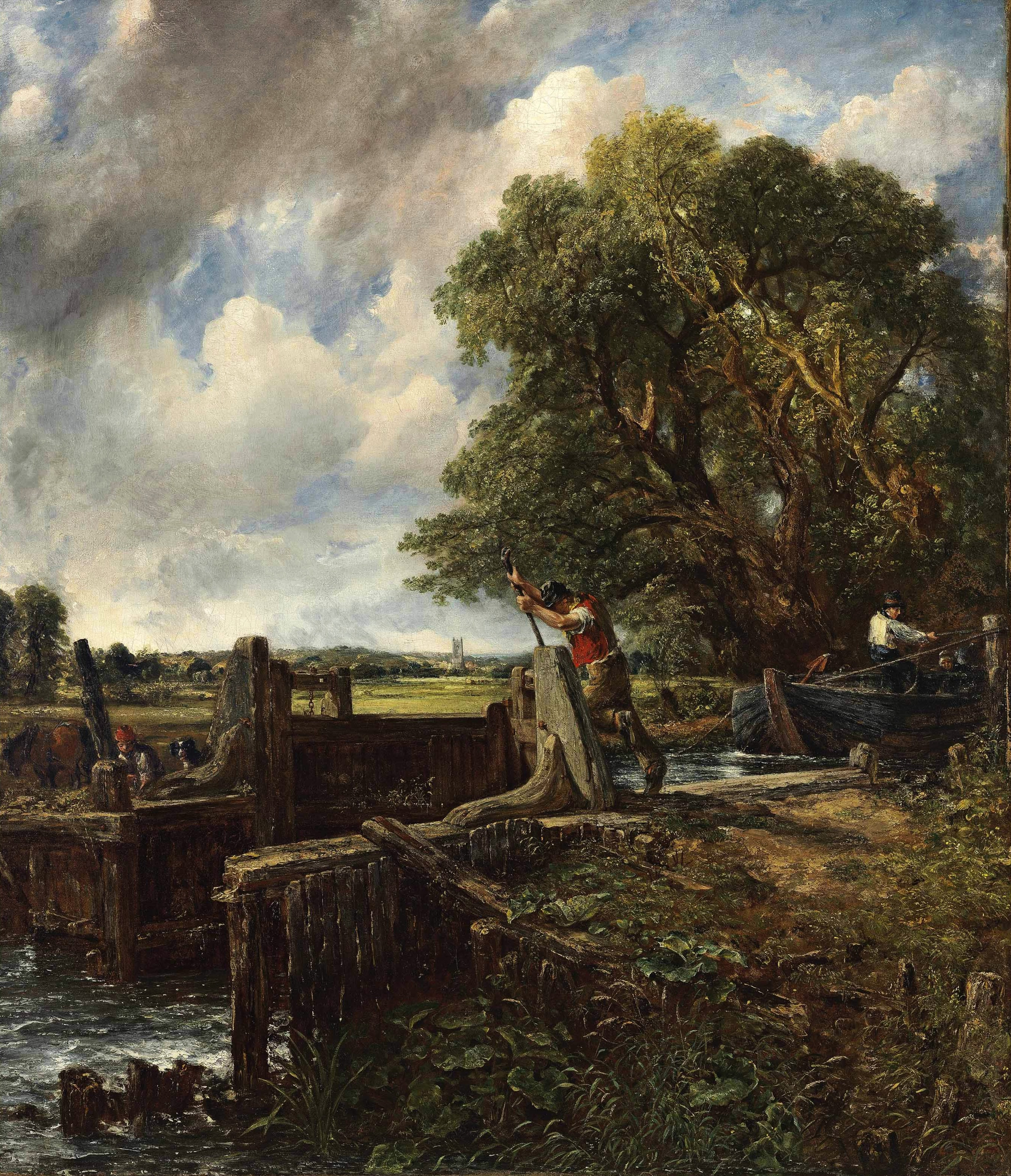
- Artist: John Constable
- Year: 1824
- Medium: Oil on canvas
- Dimensions: 121 cm × 140 cm (47.5 in × 56 in)
- Location: Private Collection

The Lock is an oil painting by English artist John Constable, finished in 1824. It depicts a rural scene on the River Stour in the English county of Suffolk, one of six paintings within the Six-Footer series. It was auctioned for £22,441,250 at Christie's in London on 3 July 2012.

== Description ==
The Lock is painted in oil on canvas. It depicts a working rural scene from Suffolk, as a figure struggles to open a canal gate at Dedham Lock near Flatford Mill in Suffolk to allow a lighter barge to progress on the River Stour. There is a distant view of Dedham church across the quintessentially English water meadows. The scene is set under a towering tree and a dramatic, cloud-filled sky.

== History ==
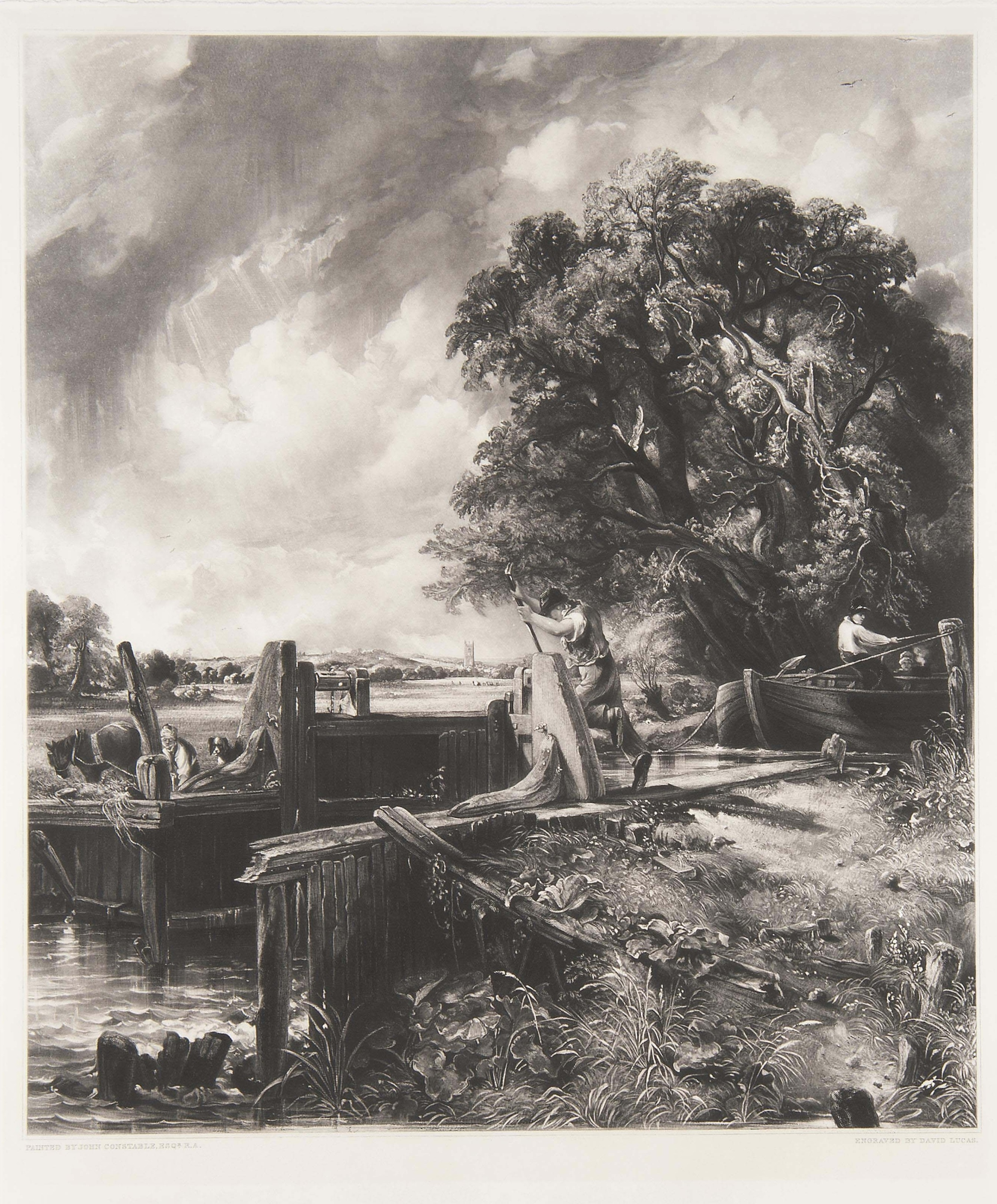
David Lucas – The Lock and Dedham Vale, 1834, mezzotint.

The Lock is the fifth of six paintings that make up the Stour series of large-scale rural works, that Constable exhibited at the Royal Academy between 1819 and 1825. The painting is the only one of the series which remains in private hands, with the more famous The Hay Wain in the National Gallery, London.

After its exhibition in 1824, The Morning Post commented: "Mr Constable contributes a landscape composition which for depth, sparkling light, freshness and vigorous effect exceeds any of his works." Samuel William Reynolds offered to make a mezzotint print, but never completed it. His pupil David Lucas eventually prepared one from Constable's private copy of the painting (Foster version).

On the opening day of the exhibition, James Morrison (1789–1857) an inn-keeper's son from Balham Hill, London, and Basildon Park, Berkshire, acquired the painting for 150 guineas, the only occasion in Constable's career when a painting sold on its first day of exhibition. Its ownership then progressed down through his family:

- Grandson, Colonel James Archibald Morrison (1873–1934), at Basildon Park
- His daughter Mary, wife of Major John Dent-Brocklehurst of Sudeley Castle, Gloucestershire
- The Trustees of the Walter Morrison Picture Settlement

On 14 November 1990 it was bought as lot No.128 for £10,780,000 at Sotheby's auction in London, by Baron Hans Heinrich Thyssen-Bornemisza and his wife Carmen "Tita" Thyssen. This set a record for a British work of art, which it held until 2006 when a view of Venice by J. M. W. Turner, Constable's rival, sold for £20.5m at Christie's in New York. From 1992, the couple placed the painting on loan to their museum, the Museo Thyssen-Bornemisza in Madrid, Spain. It was part of the Baroness's personal collection rather than the main collection.

In light of "a lack of liquid funds", the Baroness decided in 2011 to sell the painting. It was auctioned for £22,441,250 at Christie's in London on 3 July 2012, following a low estimate of £20million. Museum trustee Sir Norman Rosenthal resigned in protest at the sale, saying that the decision to sell represented ".. a moral shame on the part of all those concerned, most especially on the part of Tita."

== Foster version and 1826 version ==
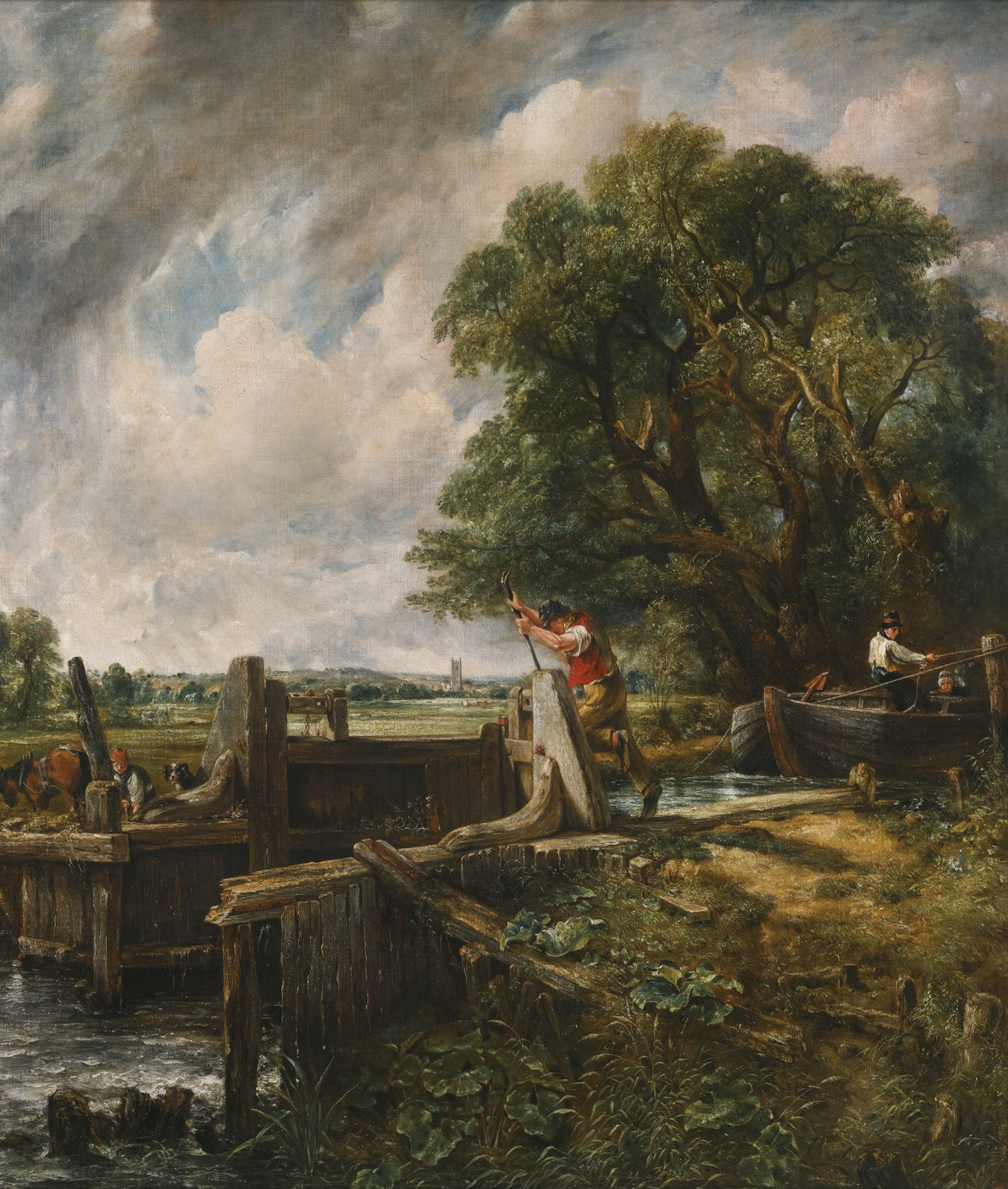
Foster version

Constable made a copy of this painting, known as the Foster version, in 1825. This was the only copy of a painting from the Stour series he made, though later he commonly made copies of his most popular compositions, such as his views of Salisbury Cathedral. The Foster version remains in private hands, one of just three such major works by Constable, and was auctioned at Sotheby's London on the evening of 9 December 2015 on its low estimate at £9,109,000. Previous owners of the painting include William Orme Foster (1814–1900) of Apley Hall, Shropshire, one time High Sheriff of Shropshire, and his descendants.

In 1826 Constable painted a variation of the same subject in landscape format, entitled A Boat Passing a Lock which he gave to the Royal Academy as his diploma work in 1829.

== See also ==
- List of paintings by John Constable
- The White Horse
- Stratford Mill
- The Hay Wain
