= Cambridge Cottage =

Building in Kew, London

Coordinates: 51°29′1″N 0°17′20″W

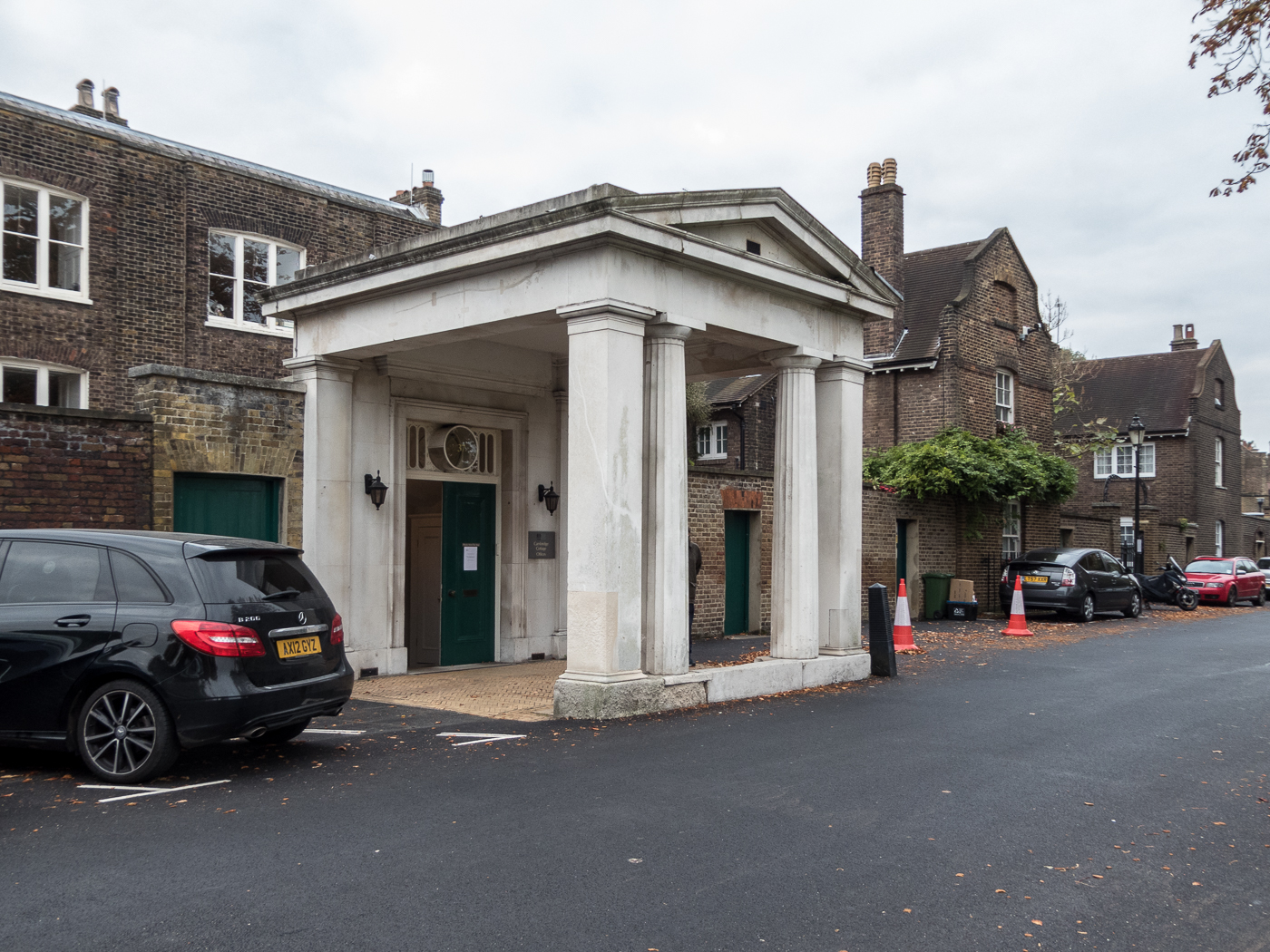
Portico entrance to Cambridge Cottage facing Kew Green

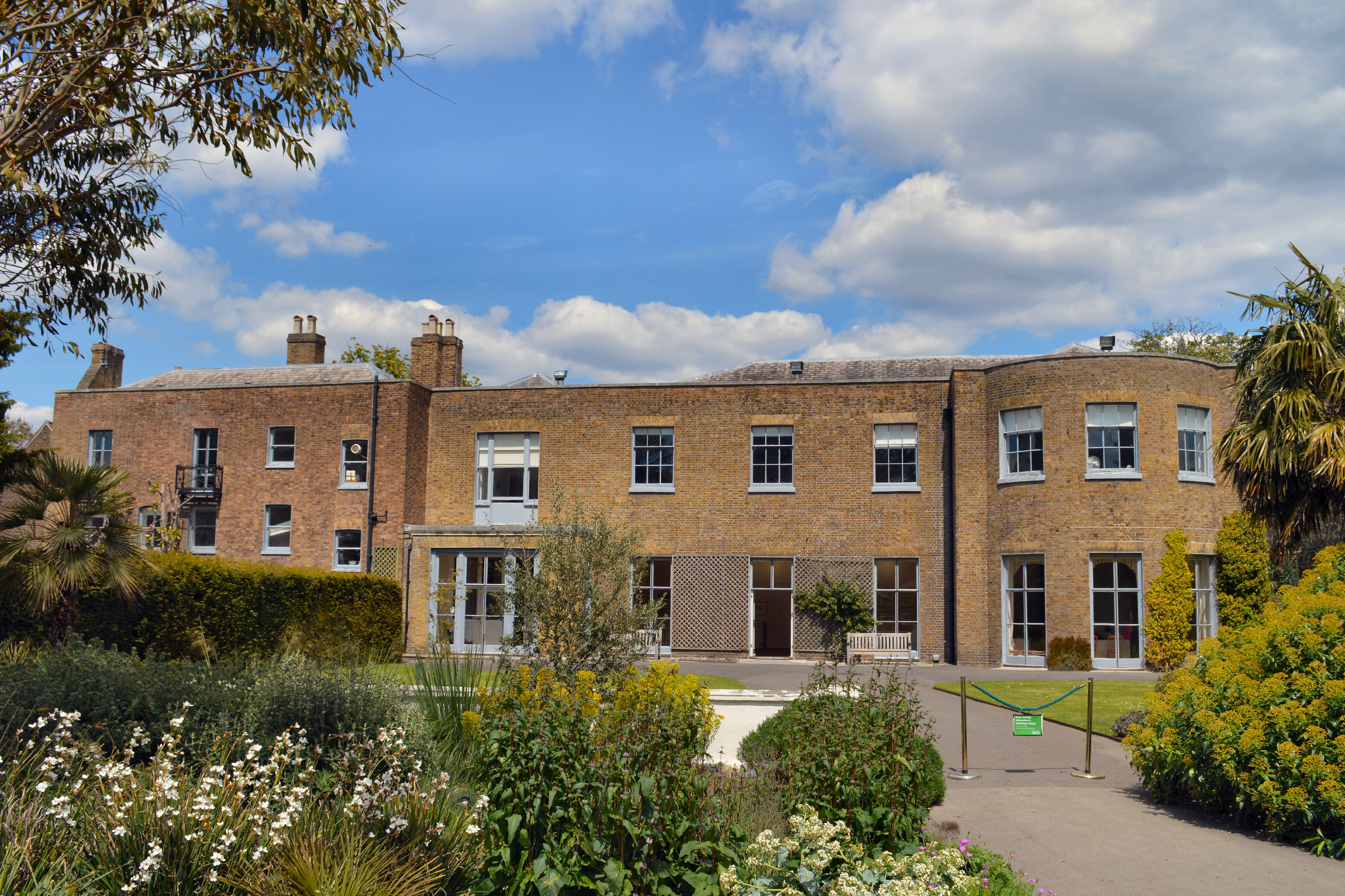
Rear of Cambridge Cottage from Kew Gardens

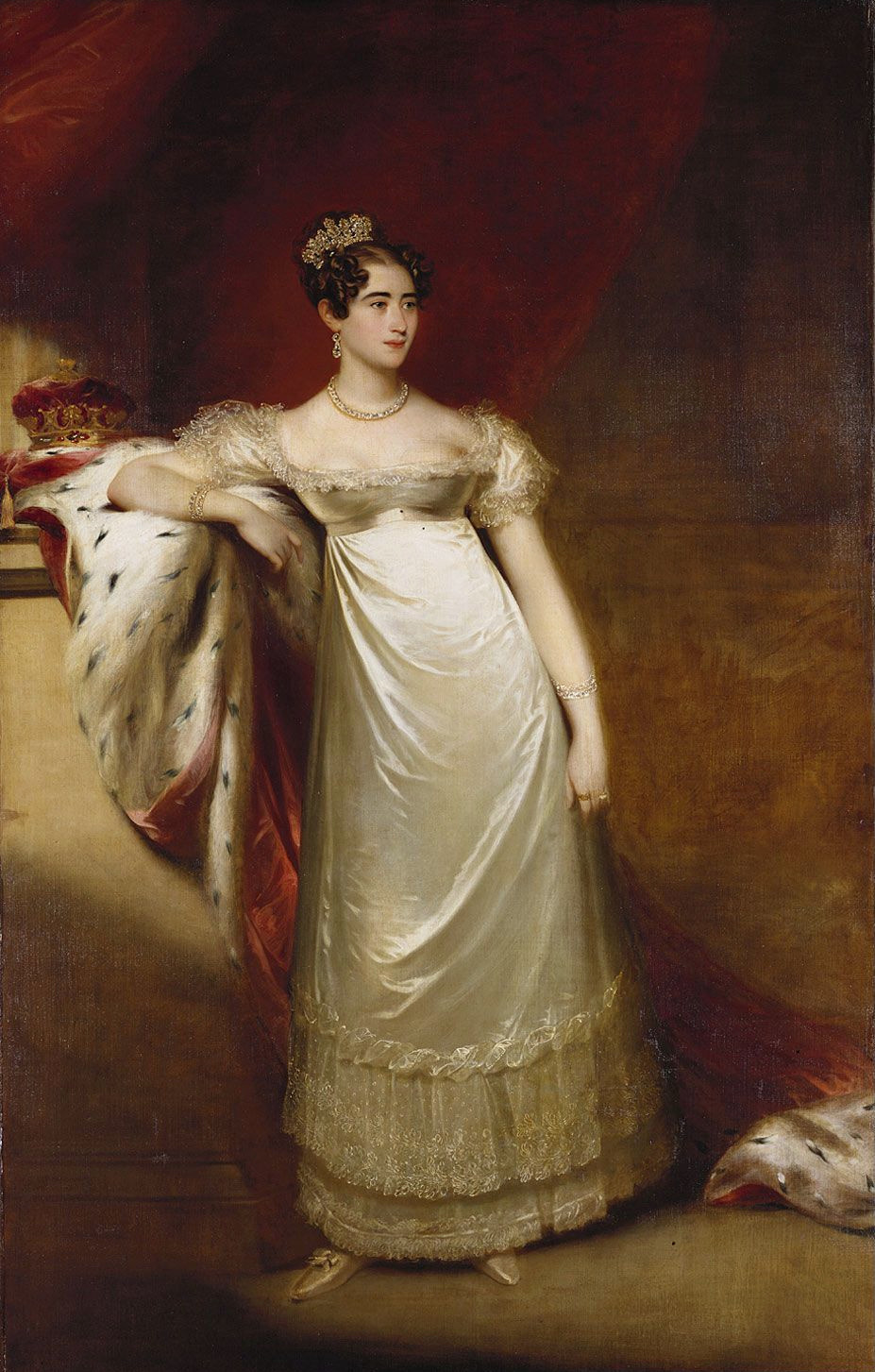
Portrait of Augusta, Duchess of Cambridge by William Beechey, 1818

Cambridge Cottage is a former royal residence in Kew in London. It is located on the west side of Kew Green, very close to St Anne's Church; the rear of the house is in Kew Gardens, where it is known as the Duke's Garden. Historically it is associated with Prince Adolphus, Duke of Cambridge and his son Prince George, Duke of Cambridge, from whom it takes its name.

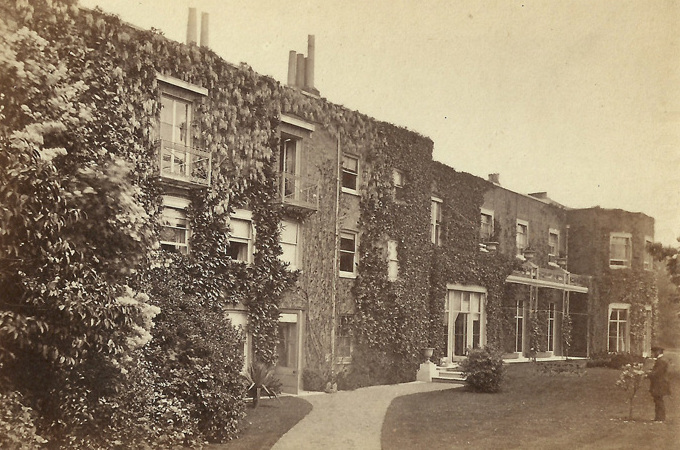
Cambridge Cottage in 1865

The connection of the House of Hanover with the area dates back to the acquisition of Richmond Lodge by the future George II from the attainted Jacobite Duke of Ormonde in the 1710s. His grandson George III occupied Kew Palace as his summer residence and his children partly grew up in the area. In 1806 he granted Cambridge Cottage to his seventh and youngest surviving son Adolphus, Duke of Cambridge while his brother Ernest Augustus, Duke of Cumberland took over King's Cottage next door. Adolphus spent a number of years away from England as Viceroy in Hanover following its 1813 liberation from French occupation. He lived at Cambridge Cottage with his wife Princess Augusta, who continued to live there for many years after her husband's death in 1850. It later passed to their son George, Duke of Cambridge, a first cousin of Queen Victoria and long-standing Commander in Chief of the British Army. On his death in 1904 it was given to Kew Gardens by his cousin Edward VII. Subsequently it was used as a museum of forestry.

Despite the building's name it is a not a cottage but a mansion. The building dates back to the early nineteenth century and features a portico entrance facing onto Kew Green. It has been a Grade II listed building since 1950.

== Bibliography ==
- Allison, Ronald & Riddell, Sarah. The Royal Encyclopedia. Macmillan Press, 1991.
- Desmond, Ray. Kew: The History of the Royal Botanic Gardens. Random House, 1998.
- Harding, Nick. Hanover and the British Empire, 1700-1837. Boydell & Brewer, 2007
