= Stratford Mill (Constable) =

1820 painting by John Constable

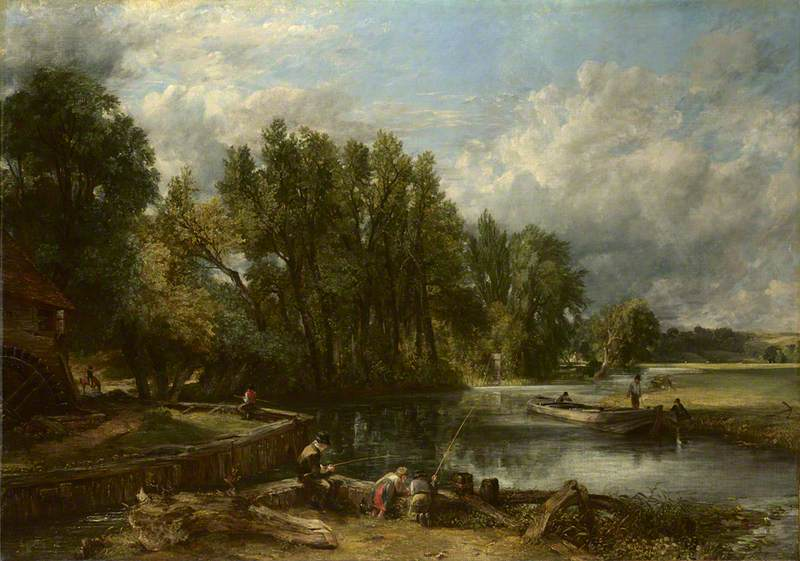
- Artist: John Constable
- Year: 1820
- Medium: Oil on canvas
- Dimensions: 127 cm × 182.9 cm (50 in × 72.0 in)
- Location: National Gallery, London

Stratford Mill is an 1820 oil on canvas painting by the British landscape artist John Constable. It is the second painting in the series of six-footers depicting working scenes on the River Stour, a series that includes The Hay Wain. The painting is now in the collection of the National Gallery in London.

== Description ==
The scene is Stratford St. Mary about two miles west of East Bergholt. Stratford Mill was a water-powered paper mill, located on a small island just outside the village, it can be seen on the far left of the picture. Constable made a sketch of children fishing by the mill in 1811 now known as Anglers at Stratford Mill (private collection), but this view extends to display more of the river, a barge and the meadow across the way.

== History ==
After the success of his first 'six-footer' The White Horse, Constable abandoned plans to paint his large canvas The Opening of Waterloo Bridge seen from Whitehall Stairs, 18 June 1817, in favour of submitting a second Stour series painting. Stratford Mill was exhibited at the Royal Academy exhibition in 1820 and was a success. The Examiner described it as having ‘a more exact look of nature than any picture we have ever seen by an Englishman’. It acquired a buyer in the loyal John Fisher, who purchased the painting for 100 Guineas, a price he himself thought too low. He gifted the painting to his solicitor and friend John Pern Tinney. Tinney loved the painting and offered Constable another 100 Guineas to paint a companion picture, Constable declined. In the years to follow Tinney would have to put up with numerous requests from Constable to borrow back his prized possession for rework and exhibitions. After Tinney's death David Lucas produced a mezzotint, which was published in 1840 under the name ‘The Young Waltonians’ in reference to the Izaak Walton book, The Compleat Angler.

The full size oil sketch is held by the Yale Center for British Art in New Haven.

== See also ==
- List of paintings by John Constable
- The White Horse
- The Hay Wain
- The Lock

== Bibliography ==
- Bailey, Anthony (2007), John Constable: A Kingdom of His Own, London: Vintage, ISBN 978-1-84413-833-3
- Beckett, R.B. (1962), John Constable's Correspondence VI: The Fishers, Woodbridge: Boydell & Brewer Ltd, ISBN 978-0-90071-609-6
- Johnson, Paul (1991), The Birth of the Modern: World Society 1815-1830, University of Michigan: HarperCollins, ISBN 978-0-06016-574-1
- Leslie, Charles Robert (1845), Memoirs of the Life of John Constable, Esq., R.A.: Composed Chiefly of His Letters, London: Longman, Brown, Green and Longmans
