= Portrait of James Monroe =

Painting by Samuel Morse

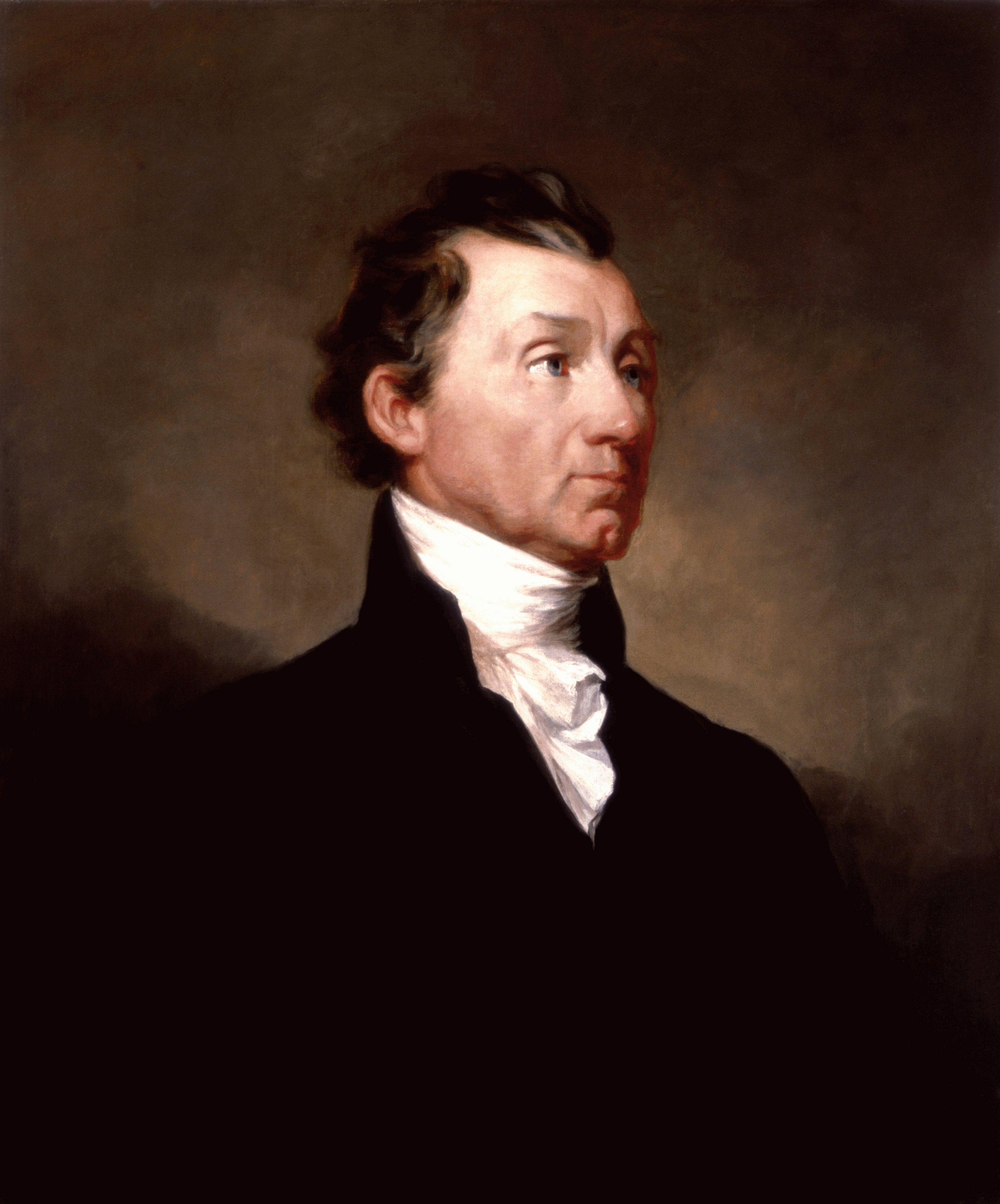
- Artist: Samuel Morse
- Year: c.1819
- Type: Oil on canvas, portrait
- Dimensions: 75.2 cm × 62.6 cm (29.6 in × 24.6 in)
- Location: White House, Washington D.C.

Portrait of James Monroe is a c.1819 portrait painting by the American artist Samuel Morse of the President of the United States James Monroe.

Monroe was the fifth president to hold office, and the fourth from Virginia. From a slaveowning background, he had served in the American Revolutionary War. In 1816 he was elected to the Presidency as a Republican, defeating the Federalist candidate Rufus King. While in office, he issued the Monroe Doctrine.

Morse was an American artist who had gone to Britain to visit the American-born President of the Royal Academy Benjamin West, only to be stranded in London by the War of 1812. On his return to the United States, he specialized in portraiture. Also an inventor, he later developed the Morse Code.

Morse was working in Charleston when he was commissioned by the city council to paint a full-length portrait of Monroe during his visit to the city. The commission was worth $750. Although Morse met with the President in Charleston, there was no time for a portrait sitting and it was agreed that Morse would travel to Washington.

In Washington, Morse found the president informal and he was invited to dinner three times. As Monroe was frequently called away, Morse was only able to manage brief sittings. Nonetheless, his completed full-length portrait was praised and the Academy of Arts in New York asked to exhibit it.

At the request of the President's daughter, Morse also produced a shorter copy of the President's head and shoulders. She said her father felt it was the only portrait that really looked like him, despite having been painted by other notable artists such as Gilbert Stuart. Today this version is in the collection of the White House.

== Bibliography ==
- Cunningham, .Noble E. The Presidency of James Monroe. University Press of Kansas, 1996.
- Kloss, William & Bolger, Doreen. Art in the White House: A Nation's Pride. White House Historical Association, 2009.
- Silverman, Kenneth. Lighting Man: The Accursed Life of Samuel F.B. Morse. Knopf Doubleday, 2012.
