= Portrait of the Earl of Durham =

Painting by Thomas Phillips

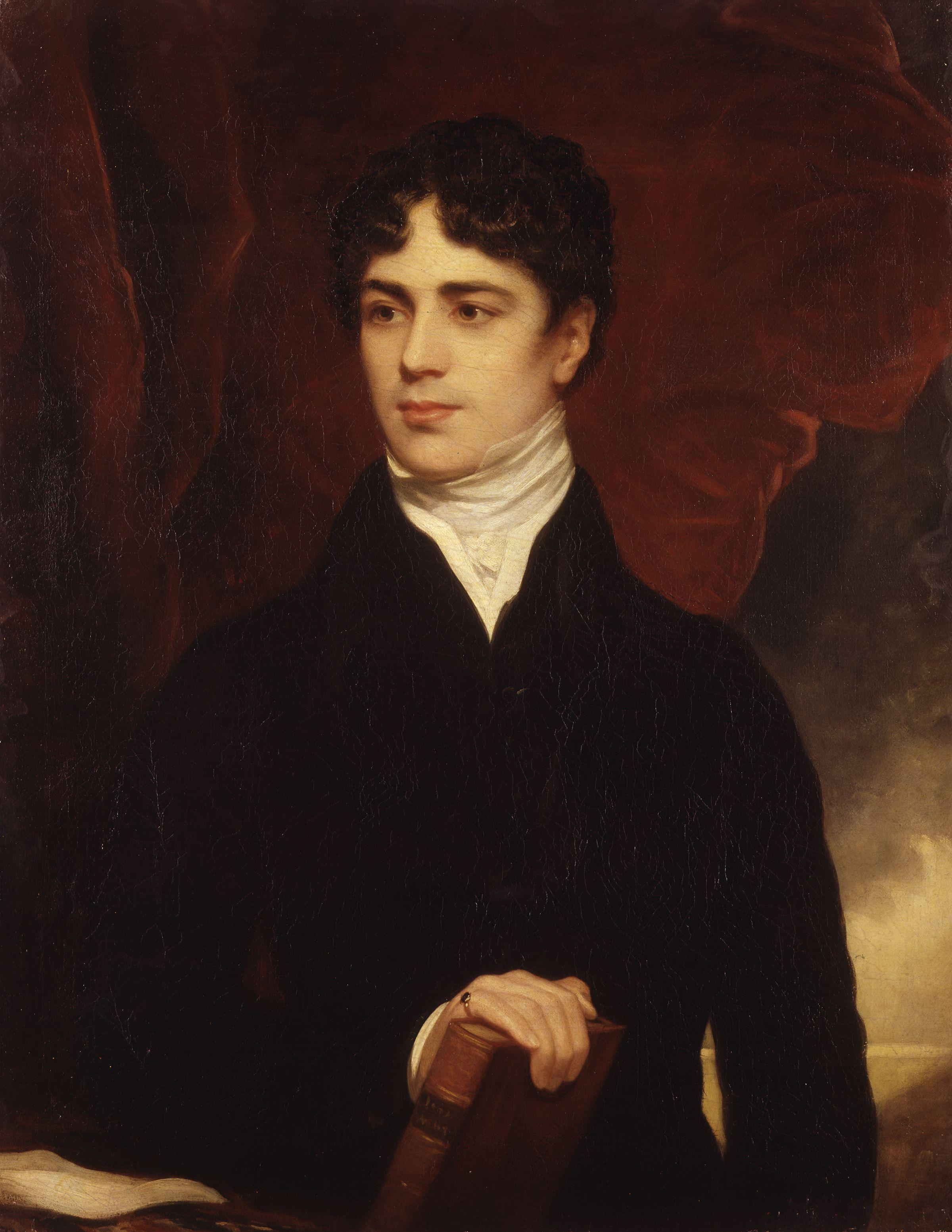
- Version in the National Portrait Gallery
- Artist: Thomas Phillips
- Year: 1819
- Type: Oil on canvas, portrait painting
- Dimensions: 91.4 cm × 71.2 cm (36.0 in × 28.0 in)
- Location: National Portrait Gallery, London

Portrait of the Earl of Durham is an oil on canvas portrait painting by the British artist Thomas Phillips, from 1819. It depicts the British aristocrat and Whig politician John Lambton, 1st Earl of Durham.

== History and description ==
Despite its common title the painting was produced before Lambton gained his title. He was the son-in-law of the future Prime Minister Earl Grey, at the time in opposition to the government of Lord Liverpool. He acquired his nickname Radical Jack" during this period. In 1833 was made Earl of Durham by Grey. After serving as British Ambassador to Russia, became known for the Durham Report on the future governance of Canada.

Phillips was a leading portraitist of the Regency era, best known for his depictions of the poet Lord Byron, although overshadowed by the success of his rival Thomas Lawrence. The original painting was displayed at the Royal Academy Exhibition of 1819 at Somerset House, in London, and now hangs at Horwick Hall, in Northumberland, the ancestral home of the Grey family. An 1820 replica produced by Phillips is in the National Portrait Gallery, in London having been acquired in 1932.

== See also ==
- Portrait of Earl Grey, an 1820 portrait by Thomas Phillips
- The Red Boy, an 1825 painting by Thomas Lawrence featuring Durham's son

== Bibliography ==
- Knowles, Valerie. From Telegrapher to Titan: The Life of William C. Van Horne. Dundurnz 2004.
