= The Post Office (painting) =

Painting by Edward Villiers Rippingille

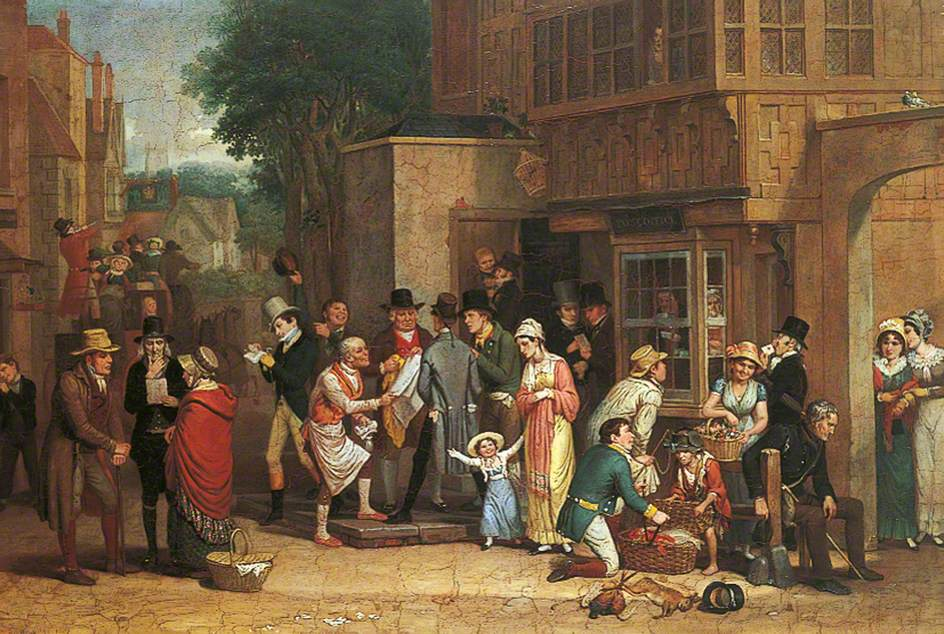
- Artist: Edward Villiers Rippingille
- Year: 1819
- Type: Oil on panel, genre painting
- Dimensions: 48.7 cm × 68.8 cm (19.2 in × 27.1 in)
- Location: Lotherton Hall, West Yorkshire

The Post Office is an 1819 genre painting by the British artist Edward Villiers Rippingille. It depicts a crowd gathered outside a post office in England. The painting was displayed at the Royal Academy Exhibition of 1819 at Somerset House in London, where it enjoyed great success.

Rippingille, a member of the Bristol School, green famous for his scenes of everyday life such as his 1822 work The Recruiting Party. Today the painting is in the collection of Lotherton Hall in West Yorkshire, part of the Leeds Museums & Galleries. It was acquired through a gift in 1955.

== Bibliography ==
- King, Rachael Scarborough. Writing to the World: Letters and the Origins of Modern Print Genres. Johns Hopkins University Press, 2018.
- Paley, Morton D. Portraits of Coleridge. Clarendon Press, 1999.
- Solkin, David H. Painting Out of the Ordinary: Modernity and the Art of Everyday Life in Early Nineteenth-century Britain. Yale University Press, 2009.

.
