= Entrance of the Meuse =

Painting by J. M. W. Turner

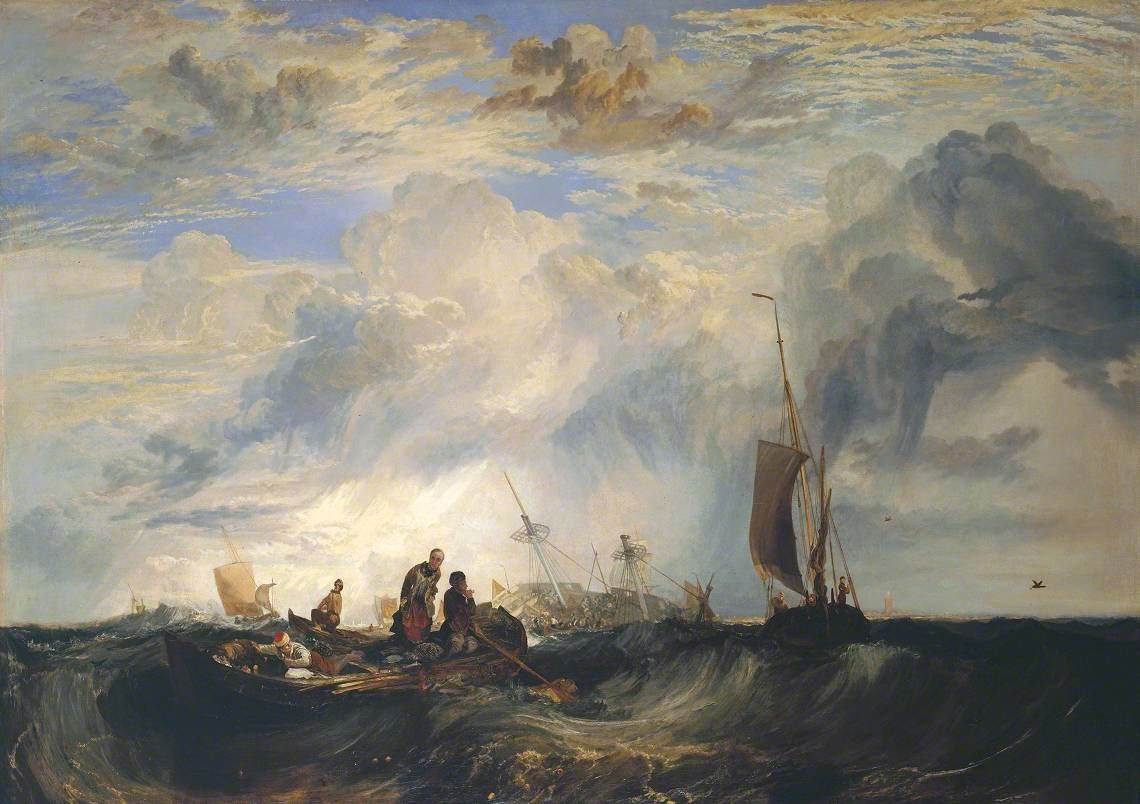
- Artist: J. M. W. Turner
- Year: 1819
- Medium: Oil on canvas
- Dimensions: 246.4 cm × 173.2 cm (97.0 in × 68.2 in)
- Location: Tate Britain, London
- Accession: N00501
- Website: tate.org.uk/...n00501

Entrance of the Meuse is an 1819 oil on canvas maritime painting by the British artist J.M.W. Turner. The painting's full title is Entrance of the Meuse: Orange-Merchant on the Bar, Going to Pieces; Brill Church bearing S. E. by S., Masensluys E. by S.. It has been cited as one of Turner's tendency for "long and serpentine" titles and "reads as it might be three paintings at least".

It depicts a Dutch merchantman carrying a cargo of oranges marooned on a sandbank in the mouth of the River Meuse. Brielle church can be seen on the horizon. The painting appears to be a pun on the word orange referring both to the fruit and to the reigning House of Orange of the United Kingdom of the Netherlands.

The painting was displayed at the Royal Academy's Summer Exhibition of 1819 at Somerset House. It was part of the 1856 Turner Bequest to the nation and is now in the collection of the Tate Britain in Pimlico.

== See also ==
- List of paintings by J. M. W. Turner

== Bibliography ==
- Bailey, Anthony. J.M.W. Turner: Standing in the Sun. Tate Enterprises, 2013.
- Hamilton, James. Constable: A Portrait. Hachette UK, 2022.
- Hamilton, James. Turner - A Life. Sceptre, 1998.
- Powell, Cecelia. Turner's Rivers of Europe: The Rhine, Meuse and Mosel. Tate Gallery, 1991
- Reynolds, Graham. Turner. Thames & Hudson, 2022.
