= John Dunthorne =

British painter (1770–1844)

- Born: 1770
- Died: 19 October 1844 (aged 73–74)
- Occupation: Painter

John Dunthorne (1770 – 19 October 1844) was a British painter.

== Biography ==
Dunthorne was a plumber and glazier in the village of East Bergholt, Suffolk. He was an intelligent man, and devoted all his spare time to painting landscapes. His cottage was close to the house of Golding Constable, and the latter's son, John Constable, early formed an intimacy with Dunthorne, and it was in Dunthorne's little house, and in his companionship, that Constable laid the foundations of his future great career as a landscape-painter. Dunthorne continued to live at East Bergholt until his death, on 19 October 1844, at the age of seventy-four. By his wife Hannah he had four children, the third of whom was John Dunthorne, jun. (1798–1832), born at East Bergholt 19 April 1798, and baptised there 3 June. Constable's attachment to the elder Dunthorne was extended in an even greater manner to the son. Young Dunthorne became Constable's constant companion and assistant, and in the latter capacity proved very useful to him. He was possessed also of considerable mathematical and mechanical ingenuity, and was highly esteemed by all who knew him. He painted landscapes on his own account, and contributed to the Royal Academy exhibitions from 1827 to 1832, and occasionally to the British Institution. In 1832, however, he suffered from disease of the heart, which caused his death early in November of that year at East Bergholt, where he was buried. There were also two artists of the name of John Dunthorne, father and son, who lived at Colchester, and contributed small genre pictures to the Royal Academy exhibitions from 1783 to 1792. Some of these were engraved in stipple by E. Scott and others. The younger Dunthorne is said to have died young, and to have shown much ability.
