= Charles Golding Constable =

Royal Indian Navy officer

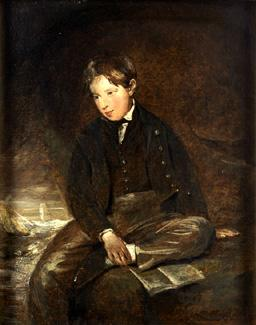
Charles Golding Constable by John Constable, 1835–36 (Britten-Pears Foundation)

Charles Golding Constable (29 March 1821 – 18 March 1878) was an Indian Navy officer who joined up in his youth. He was the second son of the painter John Constable and, on his elder brother John Charles's death in 1841, became head of the Constable family. His younger brother was the artist Lionel Constable.

He oversaw the splitting-up of his father's studio collection in winter 1847/48. On his death in 1878 he was buried alongside John Charles and their parents in the family tomb at St John-at-Hampstead, Hampstead.

He was the only one of John Constable's children to have issue.
