= John Constable =

English painter (1776–1837)

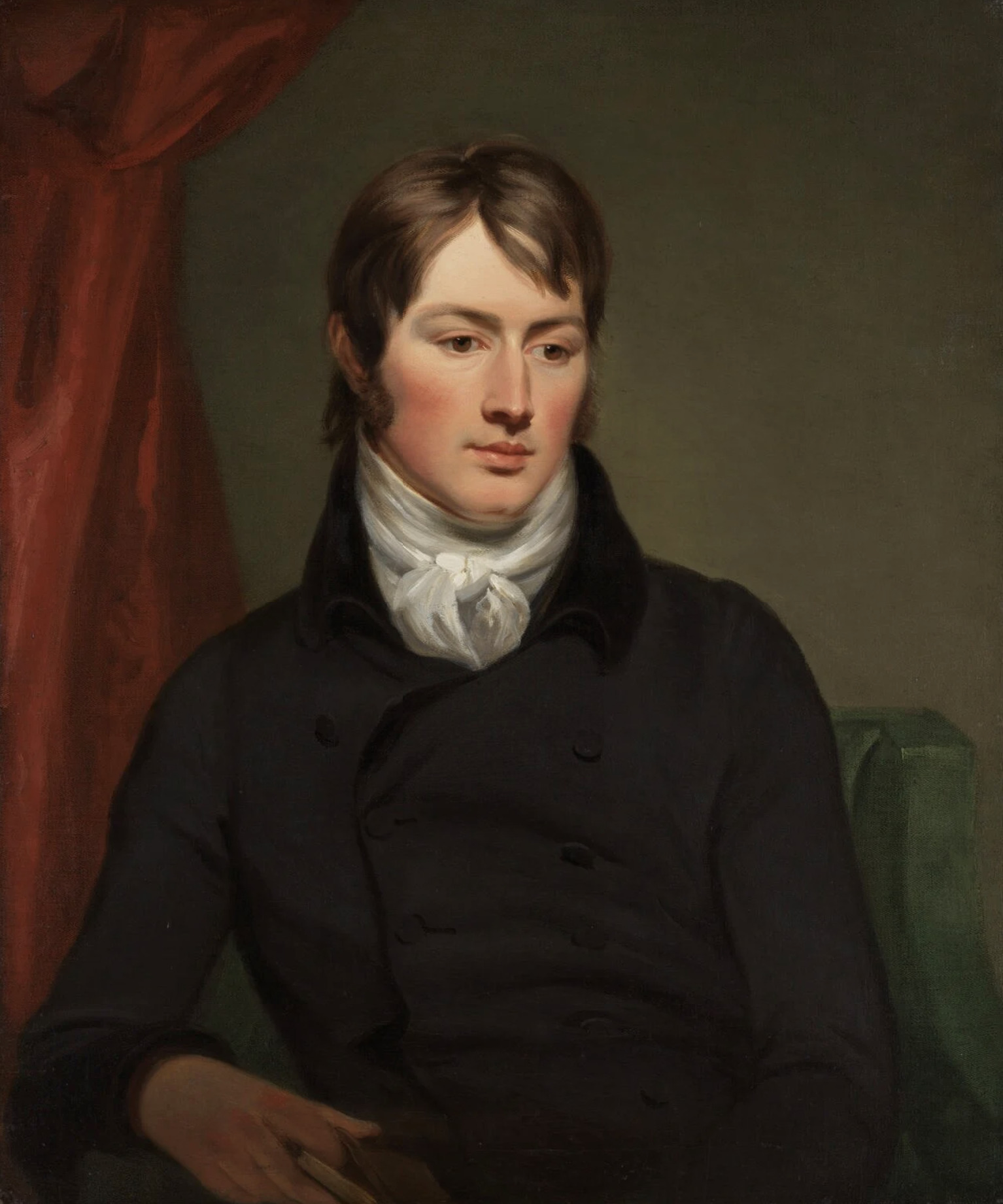
- Portrait by Ramsay Richard Reinagle, c. 1799
- Born: 11 June 1776; East Bergholt, Suffolk, England
- Died: 31 March 1837 (aged 60); London, England
- Resting place: St John-at-Hampstead, London
- Known for: Landscape painting
- Notable work: The Hay Wain; Dedham Vale
- Movement: Romanticism
- Spouse: Maria Elizabeth Bicknell (m. 1816, died 1828)
- Children: 7, including Charles Golding Constable, Lionel Constable

John Constable (/ˈkʌnstəbəl, ˈkɒn-/; 11 June 1776 – 31 March 1837) was an English landscape painter in the Romantic tradition. Born in Suffolk, he is known principally for revolutionising the genre of landscape painting with his pictures of Dedham Vale, the area on the borderland of Suffolk and north Essex surrounding his home – now known as "Constable Country" – which he invested with an intensity of affection. "I should paint my own places best", he wrote to his friend John Fisher in 1821, "painting is but another word for feeling."

Constable's most famous paintings include Wivenhoe Park (1816), Dedham Vale (1828) and The Hay Wain (1821). Although his paintings are now among the most popular and valuable in British art, he was never financially successful. He was elected to the Royal Academy of Arts at the age of 52. His work was embraced in France, where he sold more than in his native England and inspired the Barbizon school.

== Early career ==
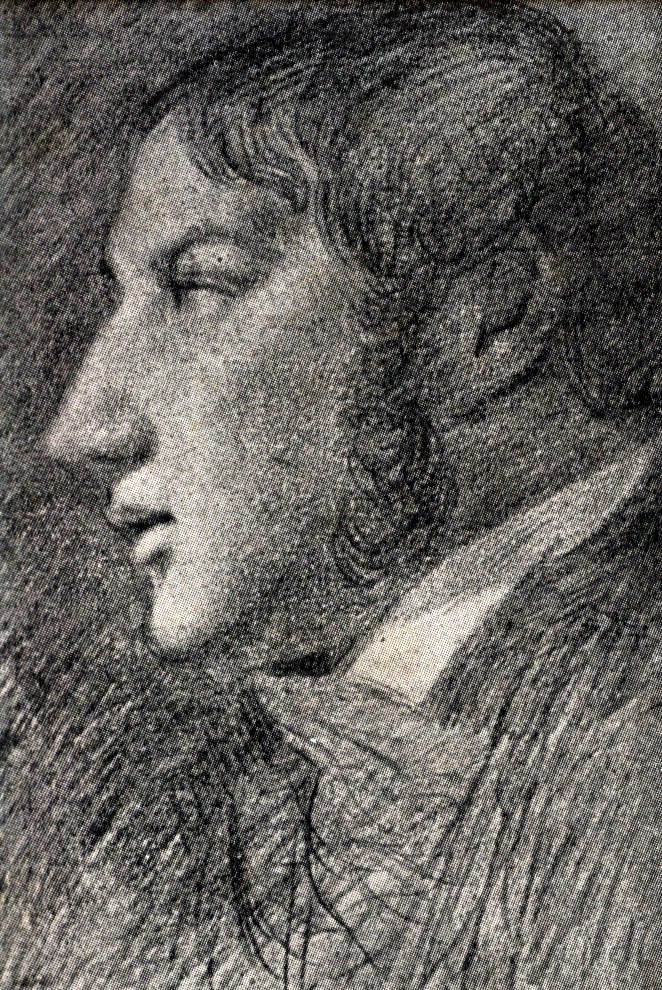
John Constable, Self-portrait 1806, pencil on paper, Tate Gallery London. His only indisputable self-portrait, drawn by an arrangement of mirrors.

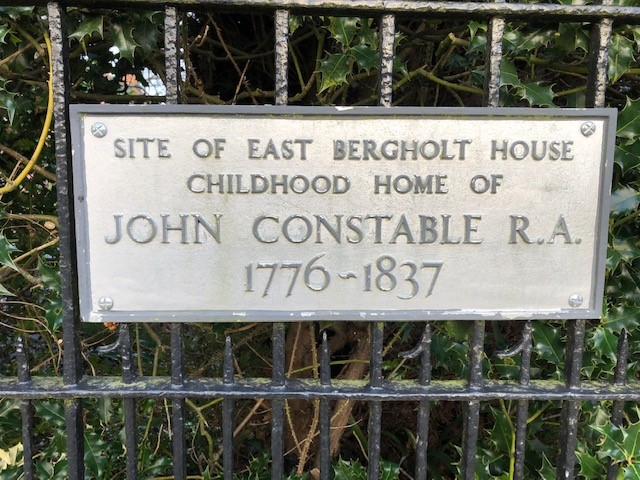
Plaque in East Bergholt marking the site of Constable's childhood home

John Constable was born in East Bergholt, a village on the River Stour in Suffolk, to Golding and Ann (Watts) Constable. His father was a wealthy corn merchant, owner of Flatford Mill in East Bergholt and, later, Dedham Mill in bordering Essex. Golding Constable owned a small ship, The Telegraph, which he moored at Mistley on the Stour estuary, and used to transport corn to London. He was a cousin of the London tea merchant, Abram Newman. Although Constable was his parents' second son, his older brother was intellectually disabled and John was expected to succeed his father in the business. After a brief period at a boarding school in Lavenham, he was enrolled in a day school in Dedham, Essex. Constable worked in the corn business after leaving school, but his younger brother Abram eventually took over the running of the mills.

In his youth, Constable embarked on amateur sketching trips in the surrounding Suffolk and Essex countryside, which was to become the subject of a large proportion of his art. These scenes, in his own words, "made me a painter, and I am grateful"; "the sound of water escaping from mill dams etc., willows, old rotten planks, slimy posts, and brickwork, I love such things." He was introduced to George Beaumont, a collector, who showed him his prized Hagar and the Angel by Claude Lorrain, which inspired Constable. Later, while visiting relatives in Middlesex, he was introduced to the professional artist John Thomas Smith, who advised him on painting but also urged him to remain in his father's business rather than take up art professionally.

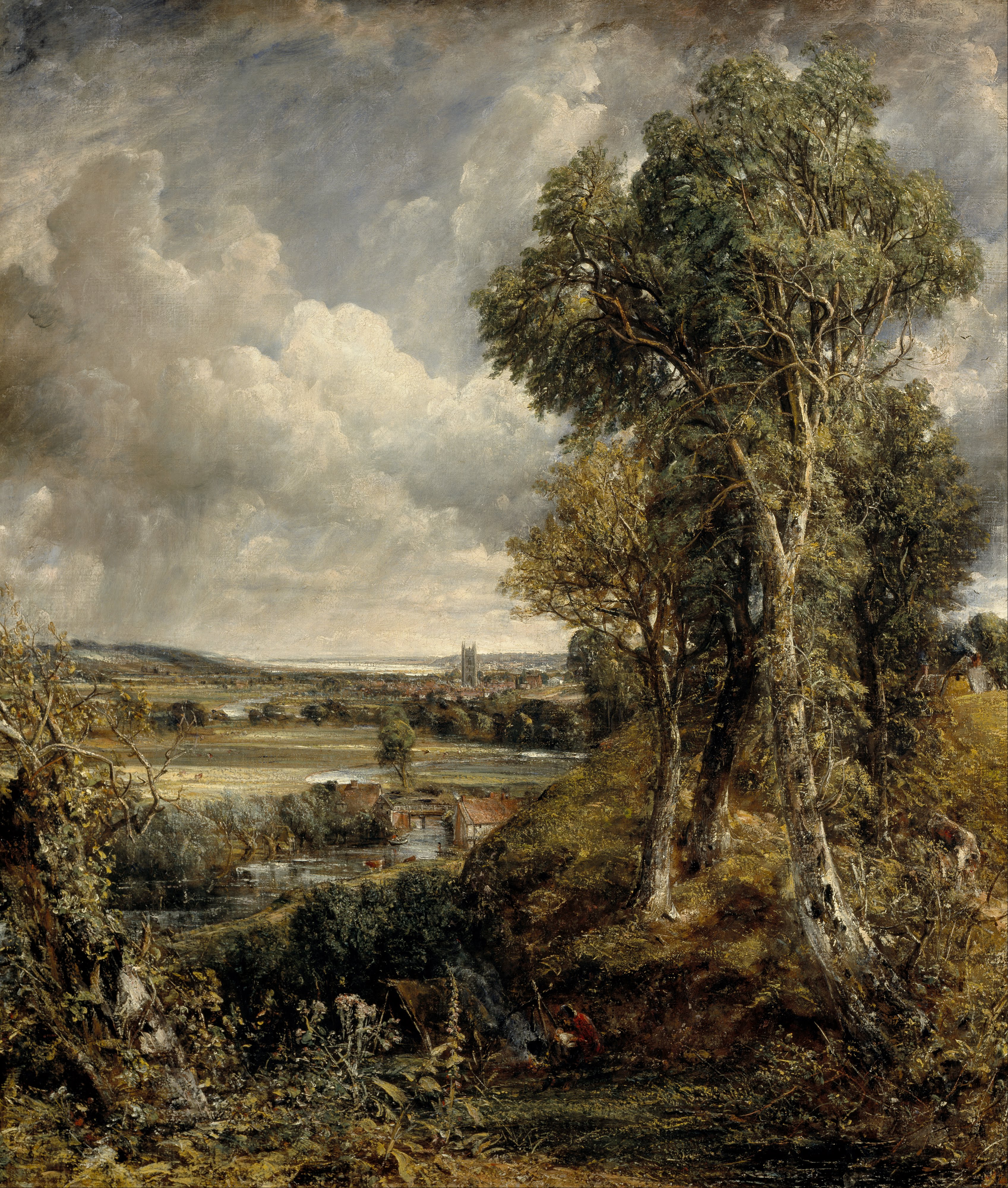
The Vale of Dedham (1828). Scottish National Gallery, Edinburgh

In 1799, Constable persuaded his father to let him pursue a career in art, and Golding granted him a small allowance. Entering the Royal Academy Schools as a probationer, where he came under the tutelage of Joseph Farington, he attended life classes and anatomical dissections, and studied and copied old masters. Constable together with fellow Farington protégé, Samuel Lane worked closely with Farington to develop their own styles until Farington death in 1821. Among works that particularly inspired him during this period were paintings by Thomas Gainsborough, Claude Lorrain, Peter Paul Rubens, Annibale Carracci and Jacob van Ruisdael. He also read widely among poetry and sermons, and later proved a notably articulate artist.

In 1802 he refused the position of drawing master at Great Marlow Military College (now Sandhurst), a move which Benjamin West (then master of the RA) counselled would mean the end of his career. In that year, Constable wrote a letter to John Dunthorne in which he spelled out his determination to become a professional landscape painter:

For the last two years I have been running after pictures, and seeking the truth at second hand... I have not endeavoured to represent nature with the same elevation of mind with which I set out, but have rather tried to make my performances look like the work of other men...There is room enough for a natural painter. The great vice of the present day is bravura, an attempt to do something beyond the truth.

His early style has many qualities associated with his mature work, including a freshness of light, colour and touch, and reveals the compositional influence of the old masters he had studied, notably of Claude Lorrain. Constable's usual subjects, scenes of ordinary daily life, were unfashionable in an age that looked for more romantic visions of wild landscapes and ruins. He made occasional trips farther afield.

By 1803, he was exhibiting paintings at the Royal Academy. In April he spent almost a month aboard the East Indiaman Coutts as it visited south-east ports while sailing from London to Deal before leaving for China.

In 1806 Constable undertook a two-month tour of the Lake District. He told his friend and biographer, Charles Robert Leslie, that the solitude of the mountains oppressed his spirits, and Leslie wrote:

His nature was peculiarly social and could not feel satisfied with scenery, however grand in itself, that did not abound in human associations. He required villages, churches, farmhouses and cottages.

Constable adopted a routine of spending winter in London and painting at East Bergholt in summer. In 1811 he first visited John Fisher and his family in Salisbury, a city whose cathedral and surrounding landscape were to inspire some of his greatest paintings.

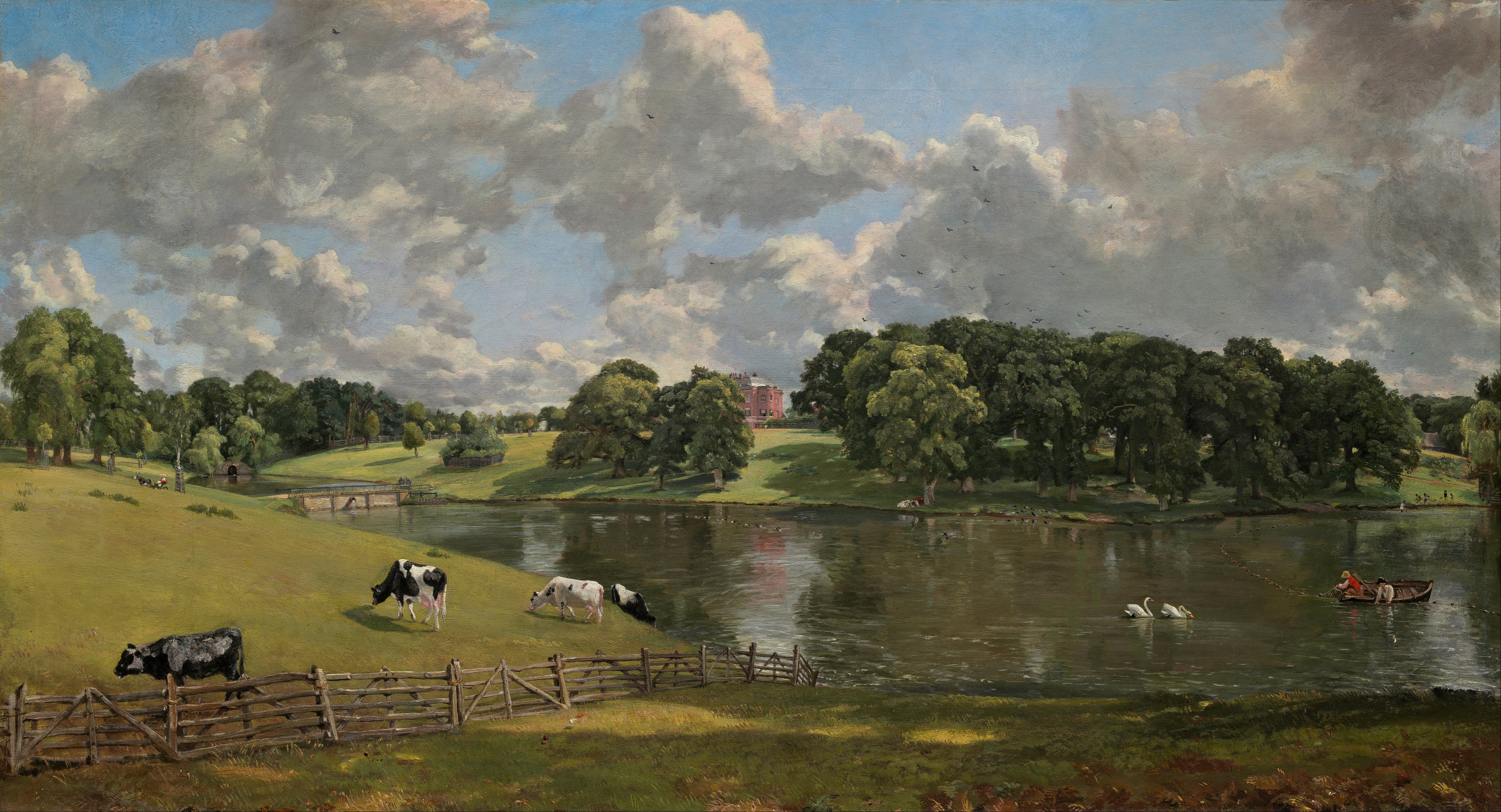
Wivenhoe Park (1816). National Gallery of Art, Washington.

To make ends meet, Constable took up portraiture, which he found dull, though he executed many fine portraits. He also painted occasional religious pictures but, according to John Walker, "Constable's incapacity as a religious painter cannot be overstated."

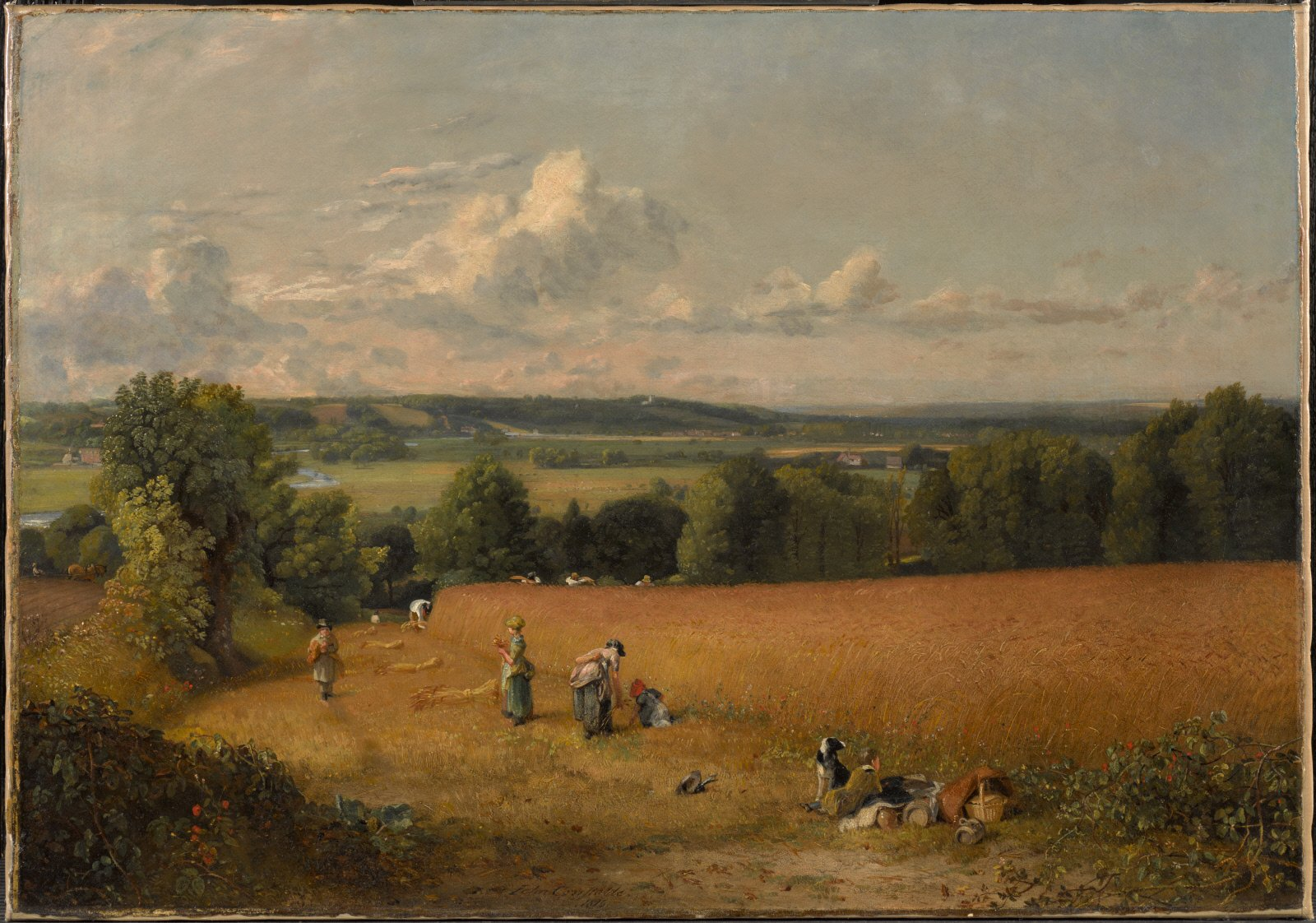
The Wheat Field, 1816, oil on canvas. Clark Art Institute, gift of the Manton Art Foundation in memory of Sir Edwin and Lady Manton

Another source of income was country house painting. In 1816, he was commissioned by Major-General Francis Slater Rebow to paint his country home, Wivenhoe Park, Essex. The Major-General also commissioned a smaller painting of the fishing lodge in the grounds of Alresford Hall, which is now in the National Gallery of Victoria. Constable used the money from these commissions towards his wedding with Maria Bicknell. This period of Constable's painting is heavily populated with idyllic country scenes with heavy detail, notably his 1816 work The Wheat Field.

== Marriage ==
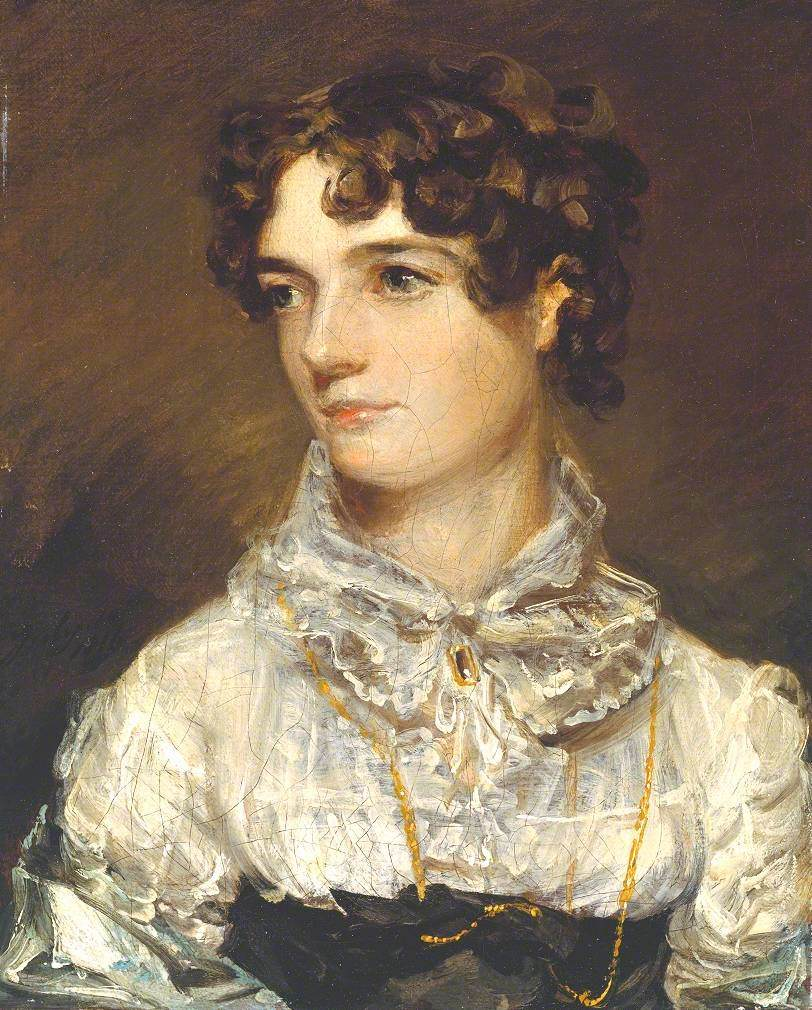
Portrait of Maria Constable, 1816. Tate Britain.

From 1809, his childhood friendship with Maria Elizabeth Bicknell developed into a deep, mutual love. Their marriage in 1816 when Constable was 40 was opposed by Maria's grandfather, Dr. Rhudde, rector of East Bergholt. He considered the Constables his social inferiors and threatened Maria with disinheritance. Maria's father, Charles Bicknell, solicitor to George IV and the Admiralty, was reluctant to see Maria throw away her inheritance. Maria pointed out to John that a penniless marriage would detract from any chances he had of making a career in painting. Golding and Ann Constable, while approving the match, held out no prospect of supporting the marriage until Constable was financially secure. After they died in quick succession, Constable inherited a fifth share in the family business.

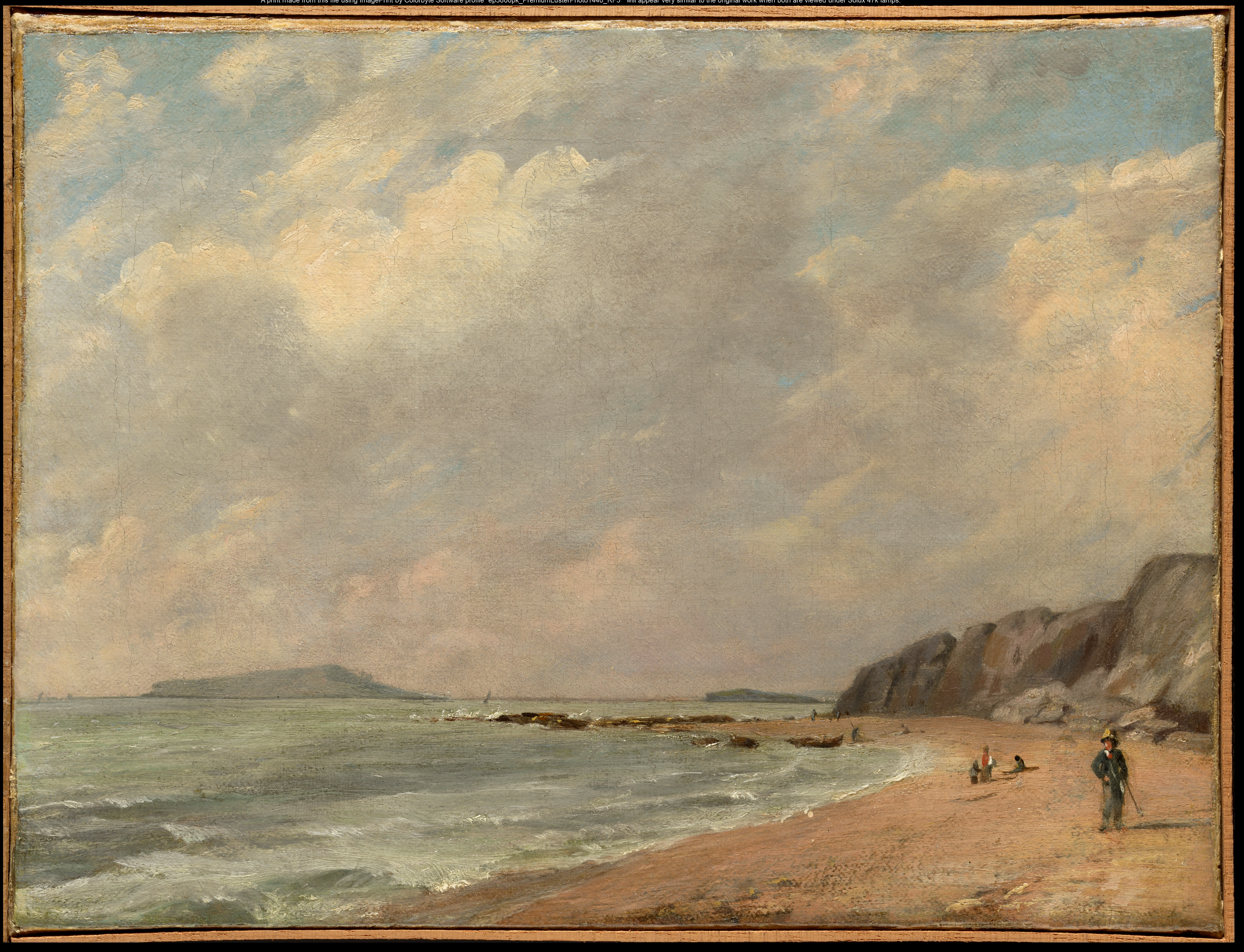
Osmington Bay, 1816, oil on canvas. Clark Art Institute, gift of the Manton Art Foundation in memory of Sir Edwin and Lady Manton.

John and Maria's marriage in October 1816 at St Martin-in-the-Fields (with Fisher officiating) was followed by time at Fisher's vicarage and a honeymoon tour of the south coast. The sea at Weymouth and Brighton stimulated Constable to develop new techniques of brilliant colour and vivacious brushwork. At the same time, a greater emotional range began to be expressed in his art. While on honeymoon, Constable began to experiment with works exploring nature's grandeur, characterized by dominating skies, such as Osmington Bay.

Constable was passionate about his objective of painting truthful pictures of nature and he usually painted on location (en plain air). But during all of his early career, he was unable to persuade others of their value. At the time, landscapes were not considered an "important" category, at the same level of historical or mythological themes. Also, the small size of his canvases made them easy to miss in the Royal Exhibition, with walls filled from ceiling to floor with larger and more imposing paintings. In 1804 he did not present any paintings, sharing his frustrations with his friend Joseph Farington, noting that nothing could be gained by putting his pictures 'in competition with works which are extravagant in colour & bad taste wanting truth.' Even though since the start of his career in the early 19th century he compared himself with Turner, it would be many years until anybody else did. That changed the moment he started painting his famous 'six-footers'.

== The 'Six-Footers' ==
In 1817 Constable started work on his most ambitious project to date. The picture was Flatford Mill (Scene on a Navigable River). It was the largest painting of a rural scene that he had done to date and the largest he would ever complete largely outdoors. Constable was determined to paint on a larger scale, his objective not only to attract more attention at the Royal Academy exhibitions but also, it seems, to project his ideas about landscape on a scale more in keeping with the achievements of the classical landscape painters he so admired. Although Flatford Mill failed to find a buyer when it was exhibited at the Royal Academy in 1817, its fine and intricate execution drew much praise, encouraging Constable to move on to the even larger canvases that were to follow.

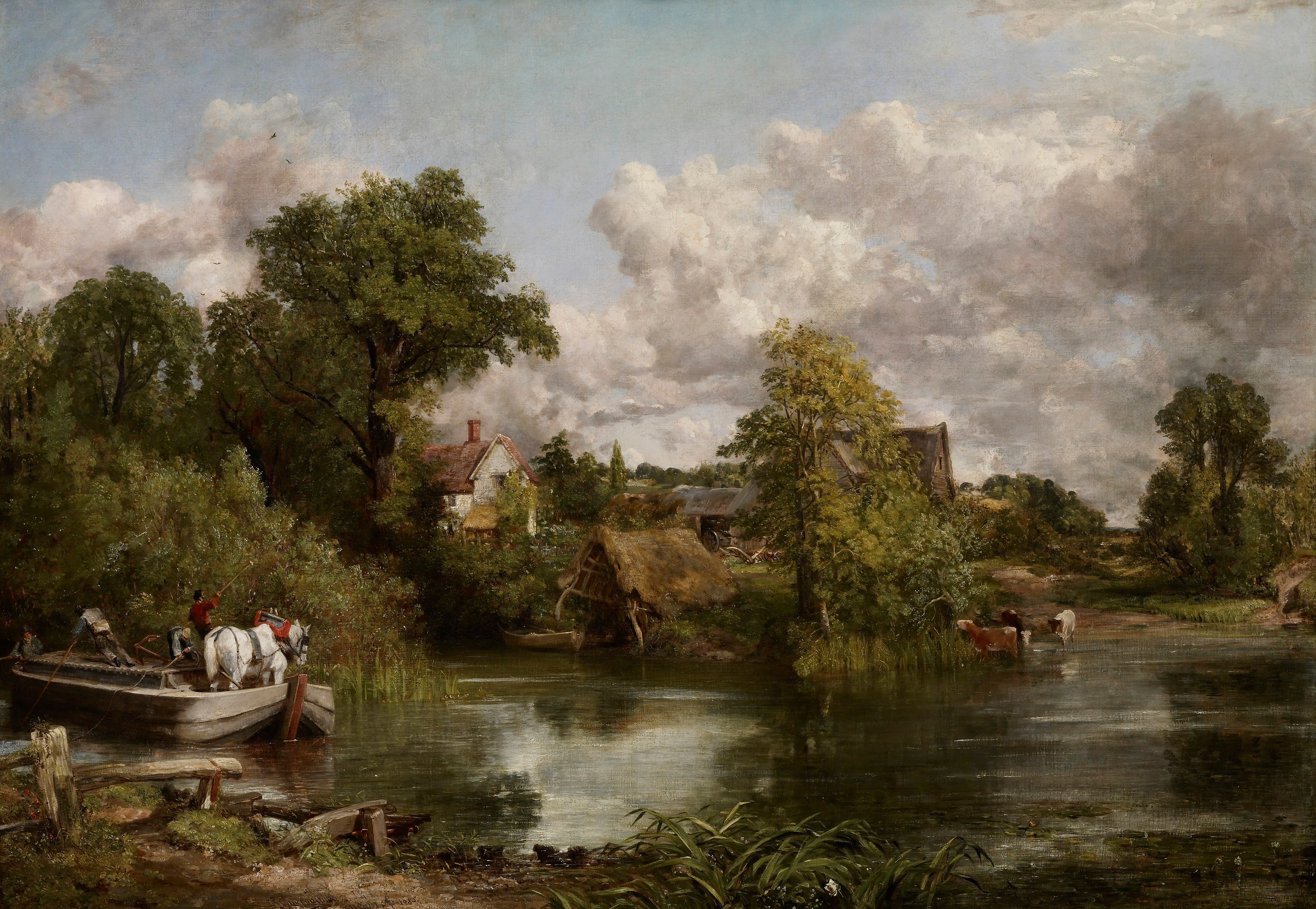
The White Horse (1819). Frick Collection.

Although he managed to scrape an income from painting, it was not until 1819 that Constable sold his first important canvas, The White Horse, described by Charles Robert Leslie as on many accounts the most important picture Constable ever painted. The painting sold for the substantial price of 100 guineas to his friend John Fisher, finally providing Constable with a level of financial freedom he had never before known. The White Horse marked an important turning point in Constable's career; its success saw him elected an associate of the Royal Academy and it led to a series of six monumental landscapes depicting narratives on the River Stour now known as the 'six-footers', in reference to their size. The series also includes Stratford Mill, 1820 (National Gallery, London); The Hay Wain, 1821 (National Gallery, London); View on the Stour near Dedham, 1822 (Huntington Library and Art Gallery, Los Angeles County); The Lock, 1824 (Private Collection); and The Leaping Horse, 1825 (Royal Academy of Arts, London).

The large size (for landscapes) of these paintings helped Constable attract attention in the competitive space of the Academy's exhibitions. Viewed as 'the knottiest and most forceful landscapes produced in 19th-century Europe', for many they are the defining works of the artist's career. For the first time, the art critics compared him with Turner, which would happen regularly in the following years. In his biographical book that compares the careers of Turner and Constable, Moorby underlines the importance of the White Horse for Constable's career: "A new decade was dawning: one that would witness the rise of John Constable."

The next year in 1820, his second 'six-footer' Stratford Mill was exhibited. The Examiner described it as having a more exact look of nature than any picture we have ever seen by an Englishman. The painting was a success, acquiring a buyer in the loyal John Fisher, who purchased it for 100 guineas (a price he himself thought too low). Fisher bought the painting for his solicitor and friend, John Pern Tinney. Tinney loved the painting so much, he offered Constable another 100 guineas to paint a companion picture, an offer the artist didn't take up. Constable's growing popularity in turn led to more lucrative commissions, such as Malrvern Hall (1821, Clark Art Institute).

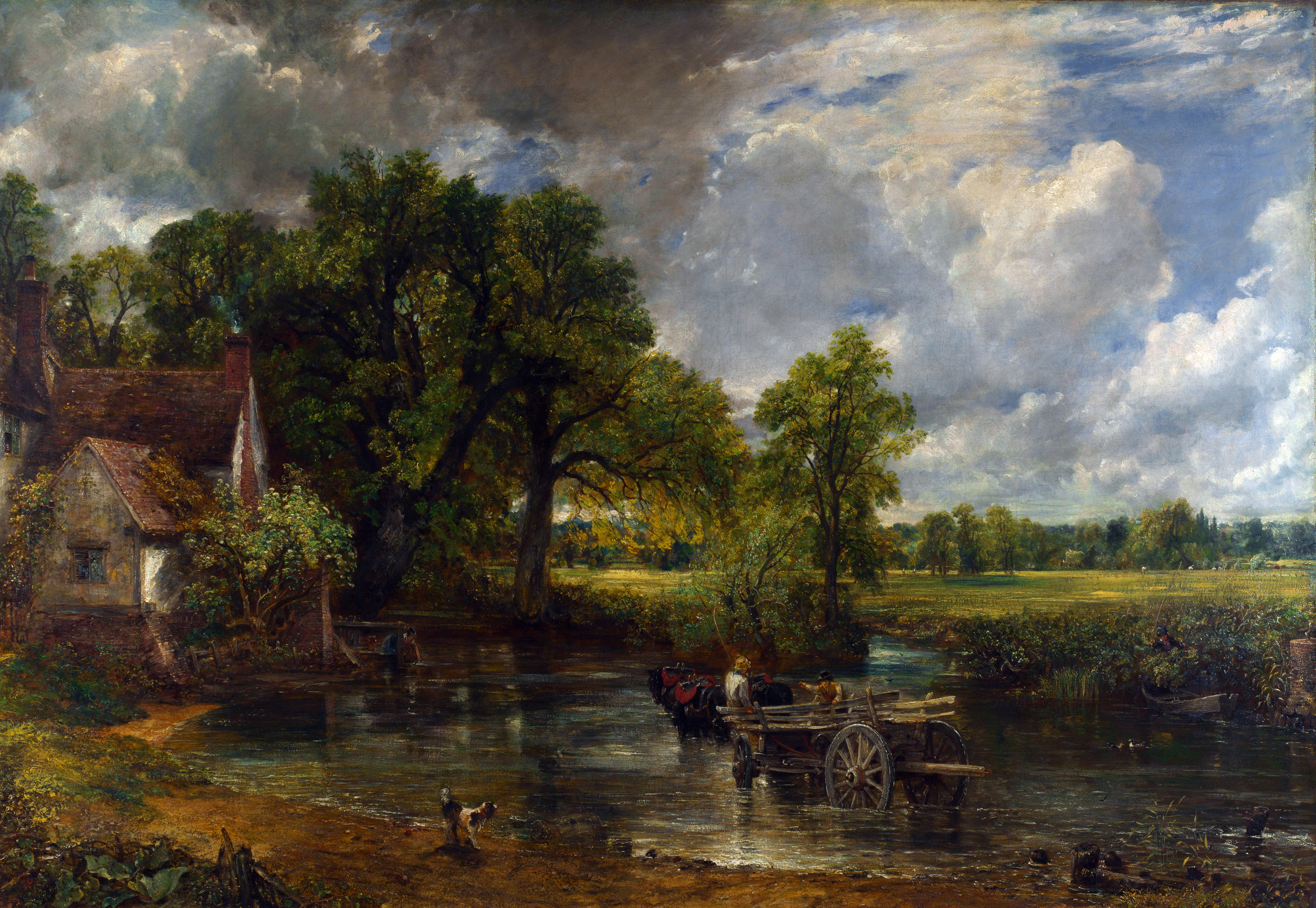
The Hay Wain (1821). National Gallery, London.

In 1821, his most famous painting The Hay Wain was shown at the Royal Academy's exhibition. Although it failed to find a buyer, it was viewed by some important people of the time, including two Frenchmen, the artist Théodore Géricault and writer Charles Nodier. According to the painter Eugène Delacroix, Géricault returned to France 'quite stunned‘ by Constable's painting, while Nodier suggested French artists should also look to nature rather than relying on trips to Rome for inspiration. It was eventually purchased, along with View on the Stour near Dedham, by the Anglo-French dealer John Arrowsmith, in 1824. A small painting Yarmouth Jetty was added to the bargain by Constable, with the sale totalling £250. Both paintings were exhibited at the Paris Salon that year, where they caused a sensation, with the Hay Wain being awarded a gold medal by Charles X. The Hay Wain was later acquired by the collector Henry Vaughan who donated it to the National Gallery in 1886.

Of Constable's colour, Delacroix wrote in his journal: "What he says here about the green of his meadows can be applied to every tone". Delacroix repainted the background of his 1824 Massacre de Scio after seeing the Constables at Arrowsmith's Gallery, which he said had done him a great deal of good.

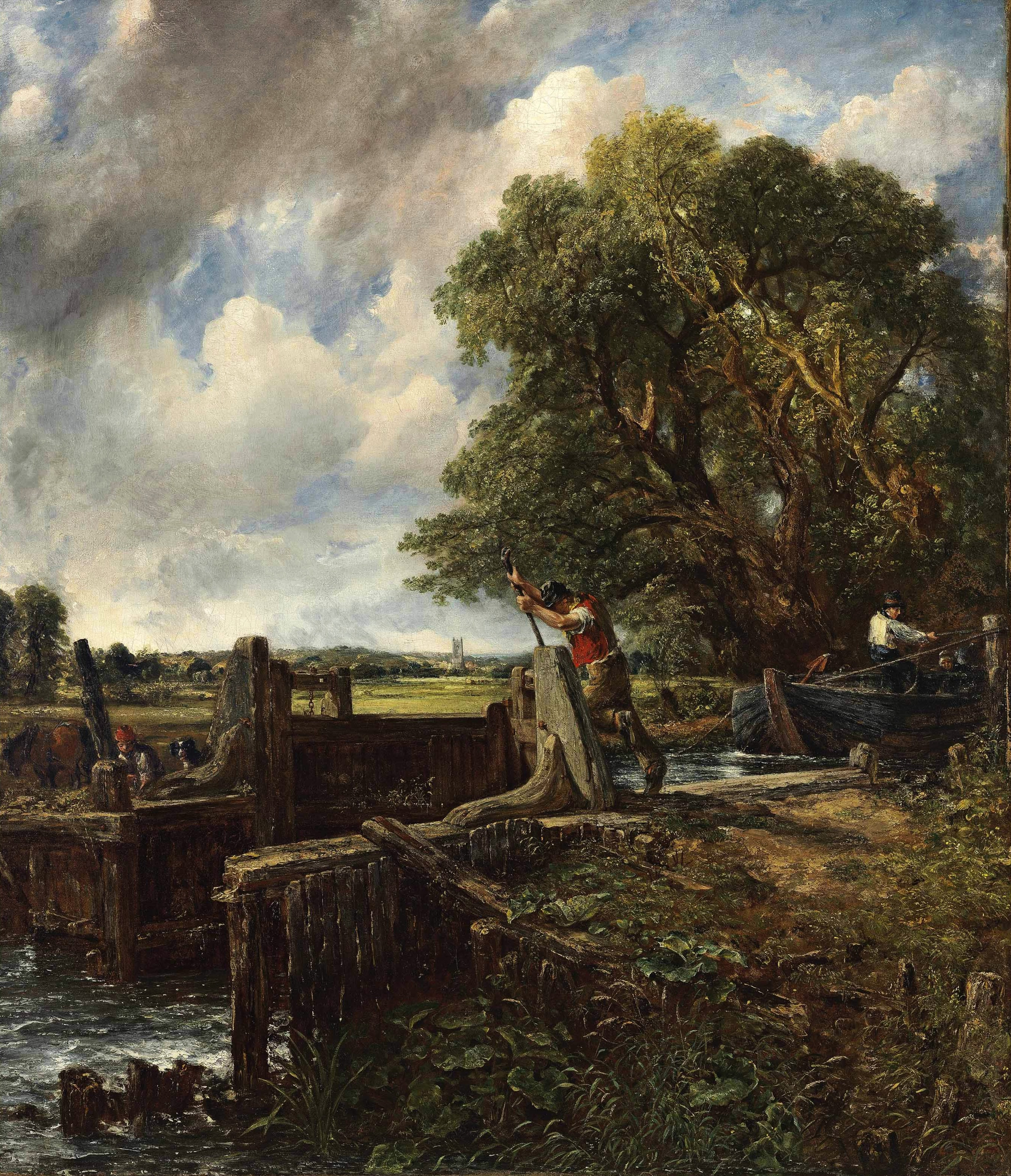
The Lock (1824). Private collection.

A number of distractions meant that The Lock wasn't finished in time for the 1823 exhibition, leaving the much smaller Salisbury Cathedral from the Bishop's Grounds as the artist's main entry. This may have occurred after Fisher forwarded Constable the money for the painting. This both helped him out of a financial difficulty and nudged him along to get the painting done. The Lock was therefore exhibited the following year to more fanfare and sold for 150 guineas on the first day of the exhibition, the only Constable ever to do so. The Lock is the only upright landscape of the Stour series and the only six-footer that Constable painted more than one version of. A second version now known as the 'Foster version' was painted in 1825 and kept by the artist to send to exhibitions. A third, landscape version, known as A Boat Passing a Lock (1826) is now in the collection of the Royal Academy of Arts. Constable's final attempt, The Leaping Horse, was the only six-footer from the Stour series that didn't sell in Constable's lifetime.

== Later life ==
Constable's pleasure at his own success was dampened after his wife started displaying symptoms of tuberculosis. Her growing illness meant that Constable took lodgings for his family in Brighton from 1824 until 1828, in the hope the sea air could restore her health. During this period Constable split his time between Charlotte Street in London and Brighton. This change saw Constable move away from large scale Stour scenes in favour of coastal scenes. He continued painting six-foot canvases, although he was initially unsure of the suitability of Brighton as a subject for painting. In a letter to Fisher in 1824 he wrote

The magnificence of the sea, and its (to use your own beautiful expression) everlasting voice, is drowned in the din & lost in the tumult of stage coaches - gigs - "flys" &c. -and the beach is only Piccadilly (that part of it where we dined) by the sea-side.

In his lifetime, Constable sold only 20 paintings in England, but in France he sold more than 20 in just a few years. Despite this, he refused all invitations to travel internationally to promote his work, writing to Francis Darby: "I would rather be a poor man [in England] than a rich man abroad." In 1825, perhaps due partly to the worry of his wife's ill-health, the uncongeniality of living in Brighton ("Piccadilly by the seaside"), and the pressure of numerous outstanding commissions, he quarreled with Arrowsmith and lost his French outlet.

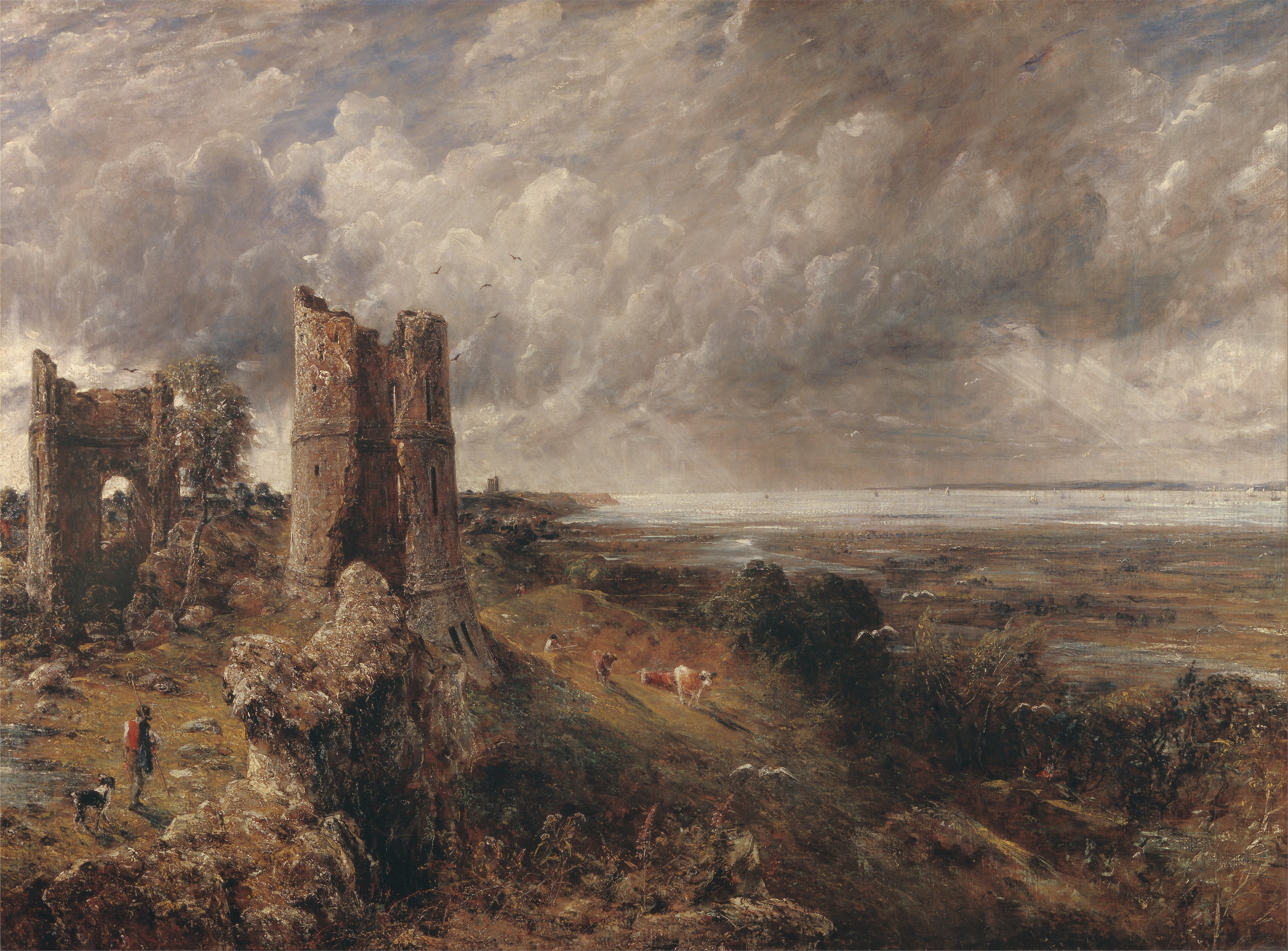
Hadleigh Castle (1829). Yale Center for British Art.

Chain Pier, Brighton was his only ambitious six-foot painting of a Brighton subject, it was exhibited in 1827. The Constables persevered in Brighton for five years to aid Maria's health, but to no avail. After the birth of their seventh child in January 1828, they returned to Hampstead where Maria died on 23 November at the age of 41. Intensely saddened, Constable wrote to his brother Golding, "hourly do I feel the loss of my departed Angel—God only knows how my children will be brought up...the face of the World is totally changed to me".

Thereafter, he dressed in black and was, according to Leslie, "a prey to melancholy and anxious thoughts". He cared for his seven children alone for the rest of his life. The children were John Charles, Maria Louisa, Charles Golding, Isobel, Emma, Alfred, and Lionel. Only Charles Golding Constable produced offspring. Several of Constable's children also painted, notably his son Lionel. While Lionel eventually gave up painting for photography, several of his works are within the collection of the Clark Art Institute.

Shortly before Maria died, her father had also died, leaving her £20,000. Constable speculated disastrously with the money, paying for the engraving of several mezzotints of some of his landscapes in preparation for a publication. He was hesitant and indecisive, nearly fell out with his engraver, and when the folios were published, could not interest enough subscribers. Constable collaborated closely with mezzotinter David Lucas on 40 prints after his landscapes, one of which went through 13 proof stages, corrected by Constable in pencil and paint. Constable said, "Lucas showed me to the public without my faults", but the venture was not a financial success.

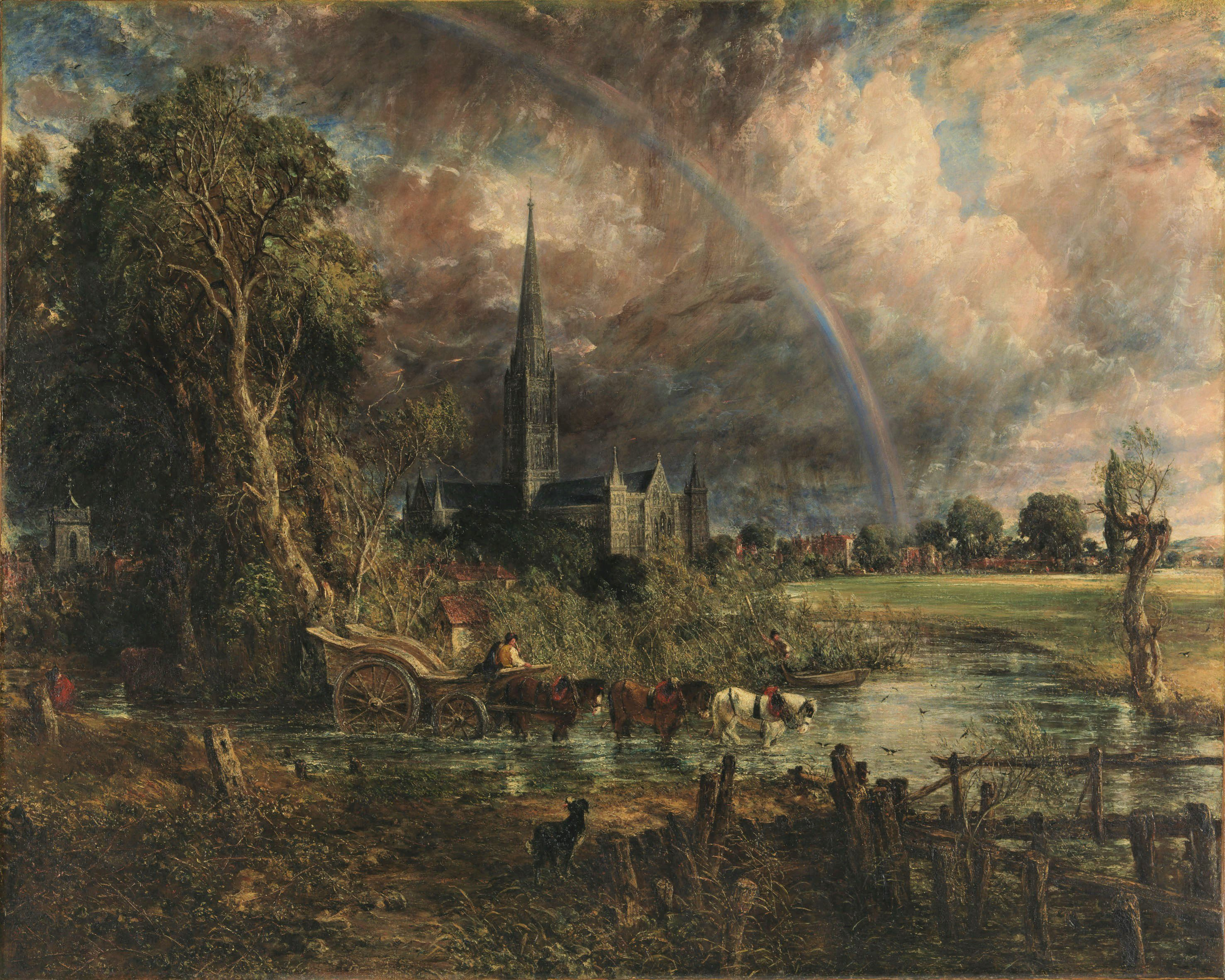
Salisbury Cathedral from the Meadows (1831). Tate Britain.

This period saw his art move from the serenity of its earlier phase, to a more broken and accented style. The turmoil and distress of his mind is clearly seen in his later six-foot masterpieces Hadleigh Castle (1829) and Salisbury Cathedral from the Meadows (1831), which are amongst his most expressive pieces.

He was elected to the Royal Academy in February 1829, at the age of 52. In 1831 he was appointed Visitor at the Royal Academy, where he seems to have been popular with the students.

He began to deliver public lectures on the history of landscape painting, which were attended by distinguished audiences. In a series of lectures at the Royal Institution in 1836, Constable proposed a three-fold thesis: firstly, painting "is scientific as well as poetic"; secondly, "that imagination never did, and never can" produce art to bear comparison with reality; and thirdly, "that no great painter was ever self taught".

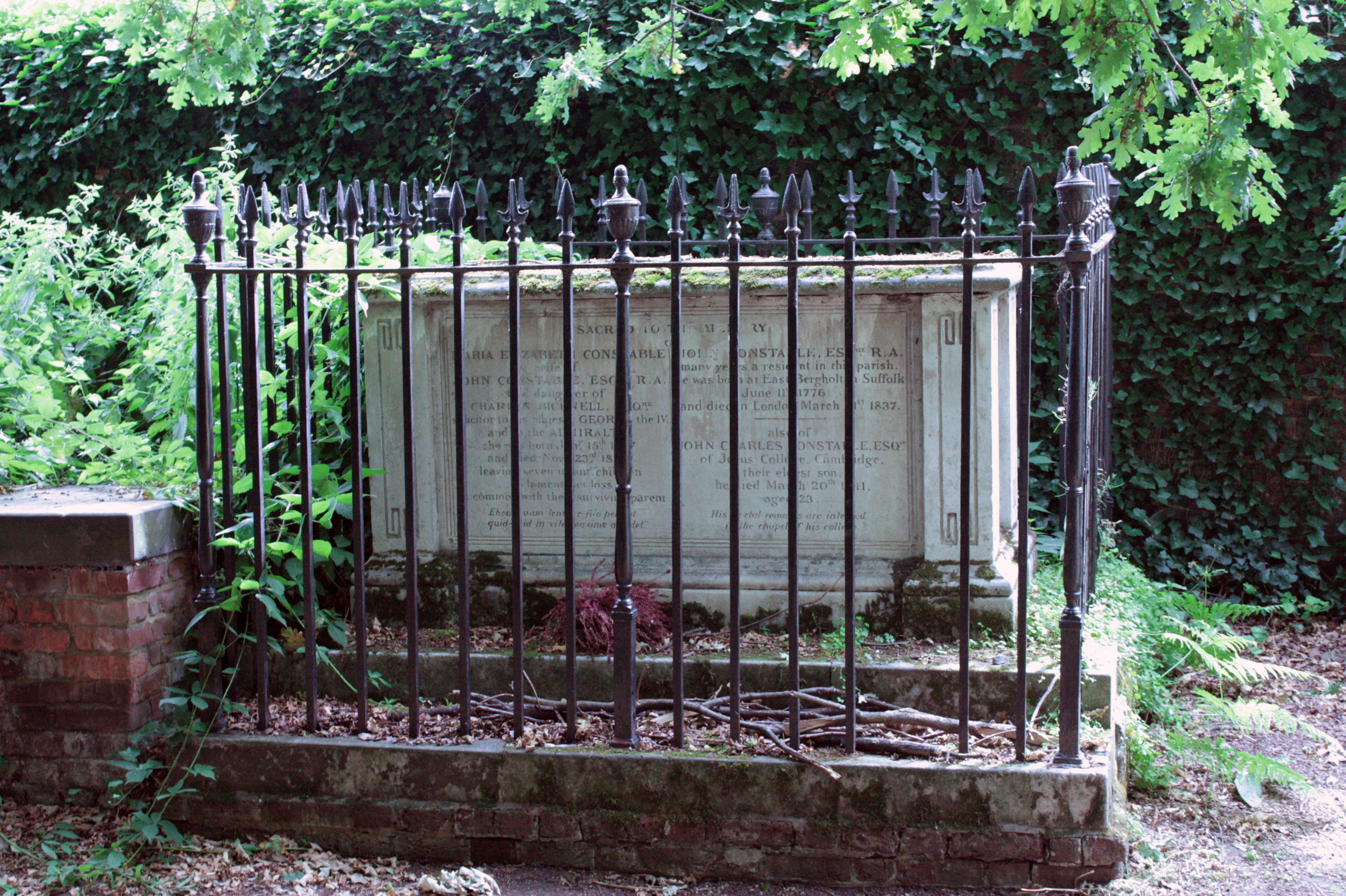
Constable's tomb at the church of St John-at-Hampstead, London

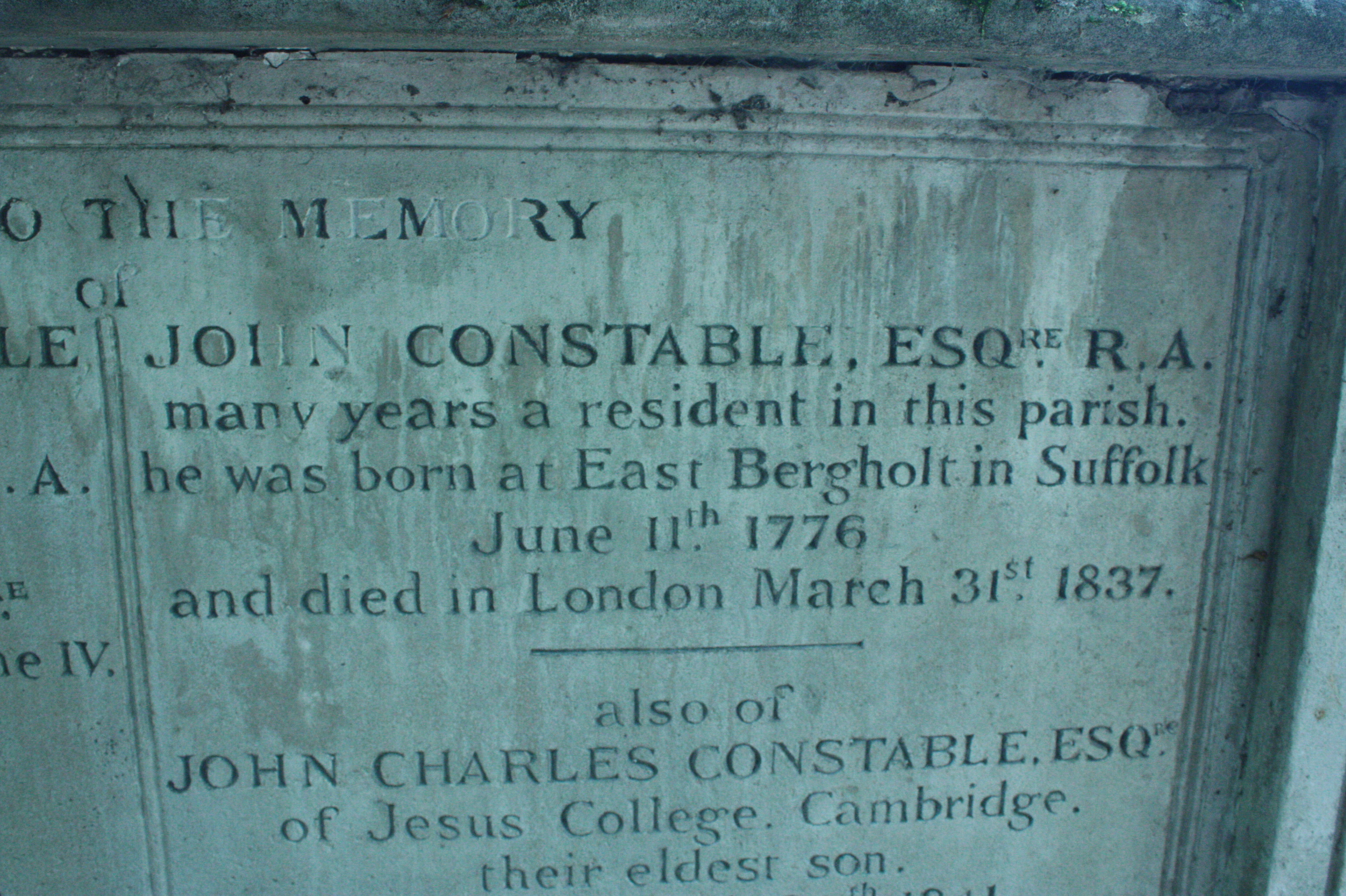
The inscription on Constable's tomb

He also spoke against the new Gothic Revival movement, which he considered mere "imitation".

In 1835, his last lecture to students of the Royal Academy, in which he praised Raphael and called the Academy the "cradle of British art", was "cheered most heartily". He died on the night of 31 March 1837, apparently from heart failure, and was buried with Maria in the graveyard of St John-at-Hampstead Church in Hampstead in London. (His children John Charles Constable and Charles Golding Constable are also buried in this family tomb.)

His friend Charles Robert Leslie published his influential biography Memoirs of the Life of John Constable in 1843.

== Locations ==
Bridge Cottage is a National Trust property, open to the public. Nearby Flatford Mill and Willy Lott's Cottage (the house visible in The Hay Wain) are used by the Field Studies Council for courses. The largest collection of original Constable paintings outside London is on display at Christchurch Mansion in Ipswich. Somerville College, Oxford is in possession of a portrait by Constable.

Constable's daughter Isabel donated a large collection of his work to the British Museum In 1888. A 2026 exhibition was largely drawn from this donation, showing primarily the artist's graphic work during his later career in the 1820s and 1830s.

== Art ==
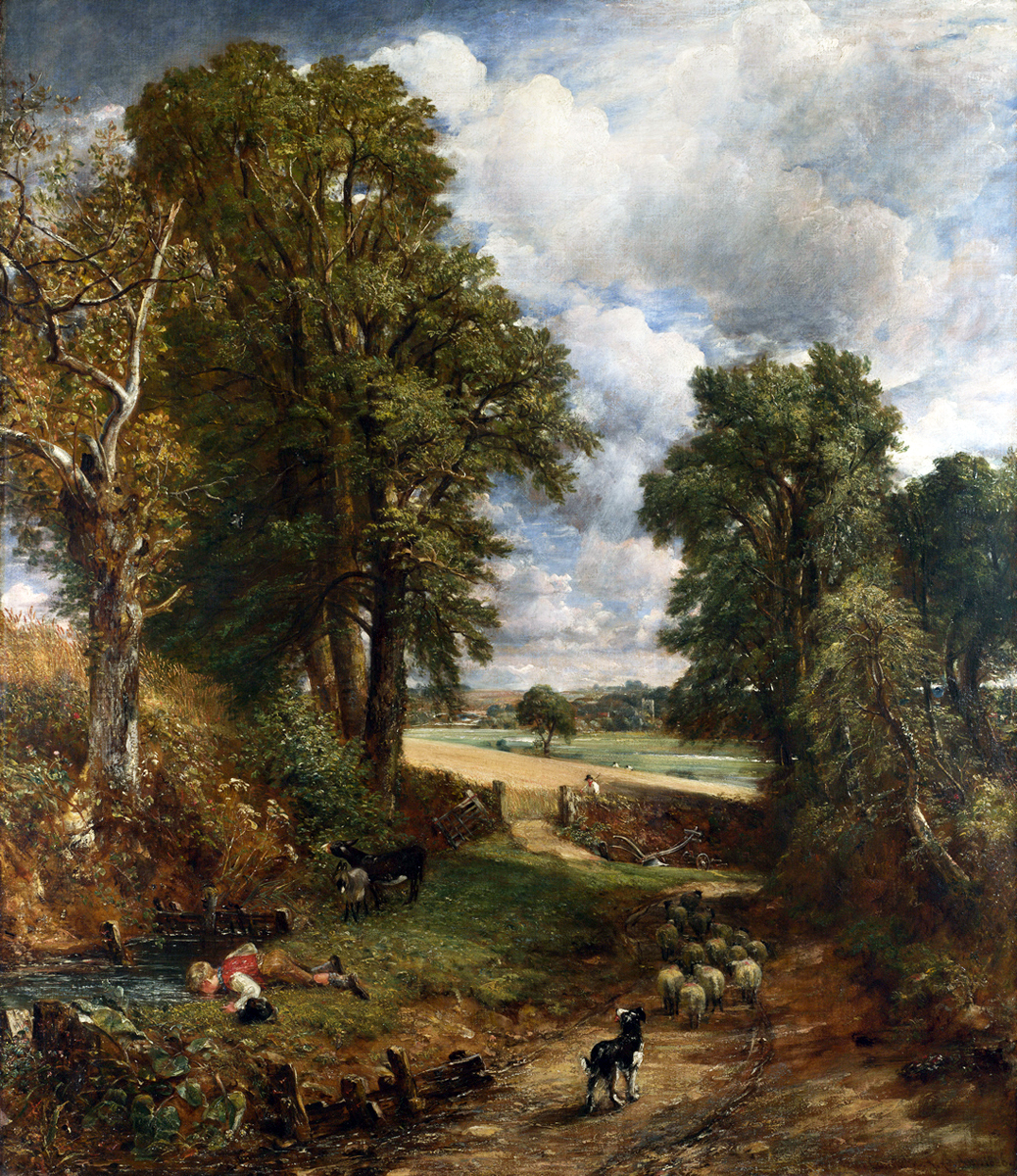
The Cornfield (1826). National Gallery, London.

Constable quietly rebelled against the artistic culture that taught artists to use their imagination to compose their pictures rather than nature itself. He told Leslie, "When I sit down to make a sketch from nature, the first thing I try to do is to forget that I have ever seen a picture."

Constable attributed his gift 'to all that lay on the Stour river', however, biographer Anthony Bailey attributed his artistic development to the influence of his well to do relative, Thomas Allen and the London contacts he introduced Constable to.

Although Constable produced paintings throughout his life for the "finished" picture market of patrons and R.A. exhibitions, constant refreshment in the form of on-the-spot studies was essential to his working method. He was never satisfied with following a formula. "The world is wide," he wrote, "no two days are alike, nor even two hours; neither were there ever two leaves of a tree alike since the creation of all the world; and the genuine productions of art, like those of nature, are all distinct from each other."

Constable painted many full-scale preliminary sketches of his landscapes to test the composition in advance of finished pictures. These large sketches, with their free and vigorous brushwork, were revolutionary at the time, and they continue to interest artists, scholars and the general public. The oil sketches of The Leaping Horse and The Hay Wain, for example, convey a vigour and expressiveness missing from Constable's finished paintings of the same subjects. Possibly more than any other aspect of Constable's work, the oil sketches reveal him in retrospect to have been an avant-garde painter, one who demonstrated that landscape painting could be taken in a totally new direction.

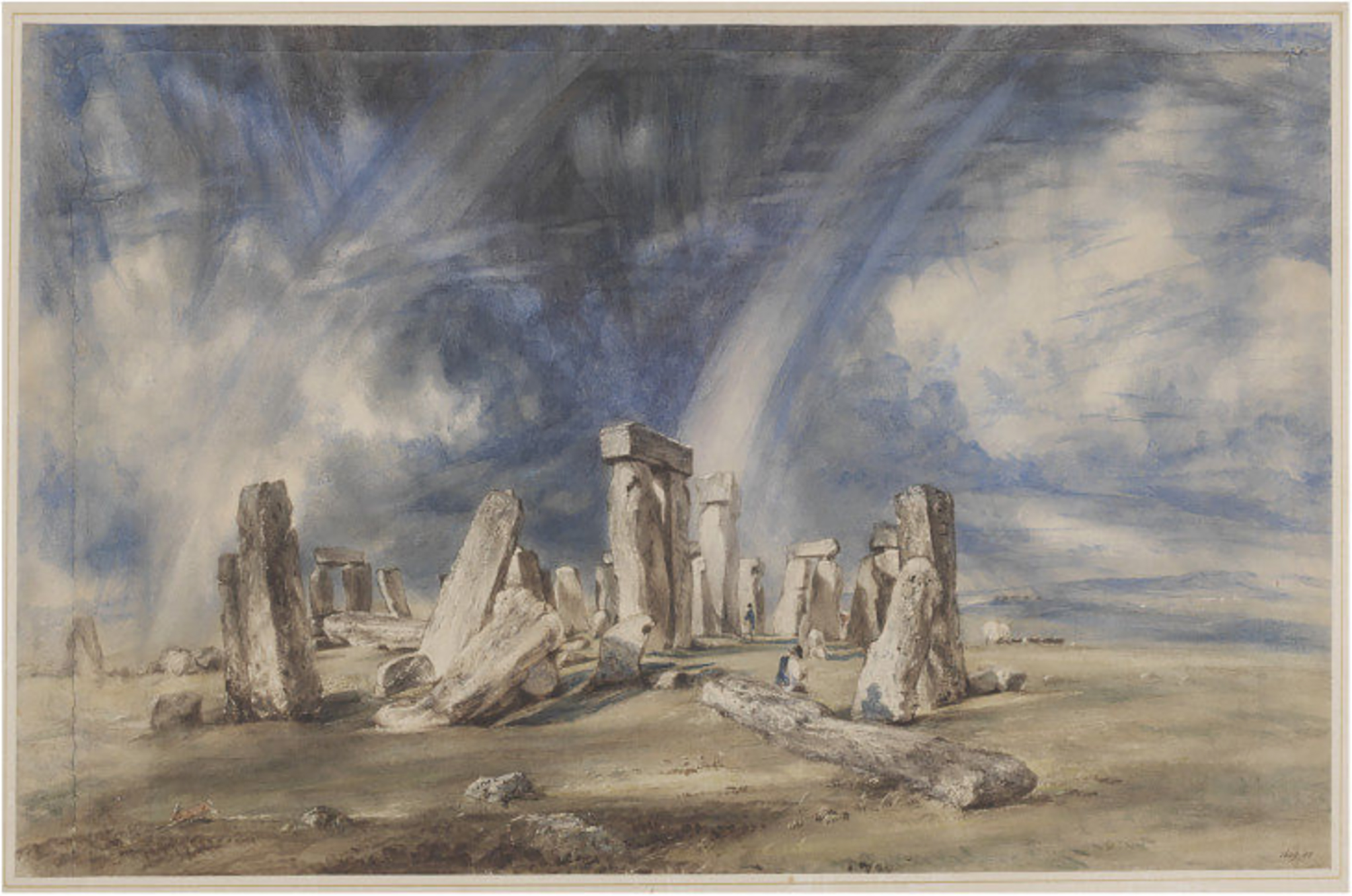
Stonehenge (1835). Victoria and Albert Museum, London.

Constable's watercolours were also remarkably free for their time: the almost mystical Stonehenge, 1835, with its double rainbow, is often considered to be one of the greatest watercolours ever painted. When he exhibited it in 1836, Constable appended a text to the title: "The mysterious monument of Stonehenge, standing remote on a bare and boundless heath, as much unconnected with the events of past ages as it is with the uses of the present, carries you back beyond all historical records into the obscurity of a totally unknown period."

In addition to the full-scale oil sketches, Constable completed numerous observational studies of landscapes and clouds, determined to become more scientific in his recording of atmospheric conditions. The power of his physical effects was sometimes apparent even in the full-scale paintings which he exhibited in London; The Chain Pier, 1827, for example, prompted a critic to write: "the atmosphere possesses a characteristic humidity about it, that almost imparts the wish for an umbrella".

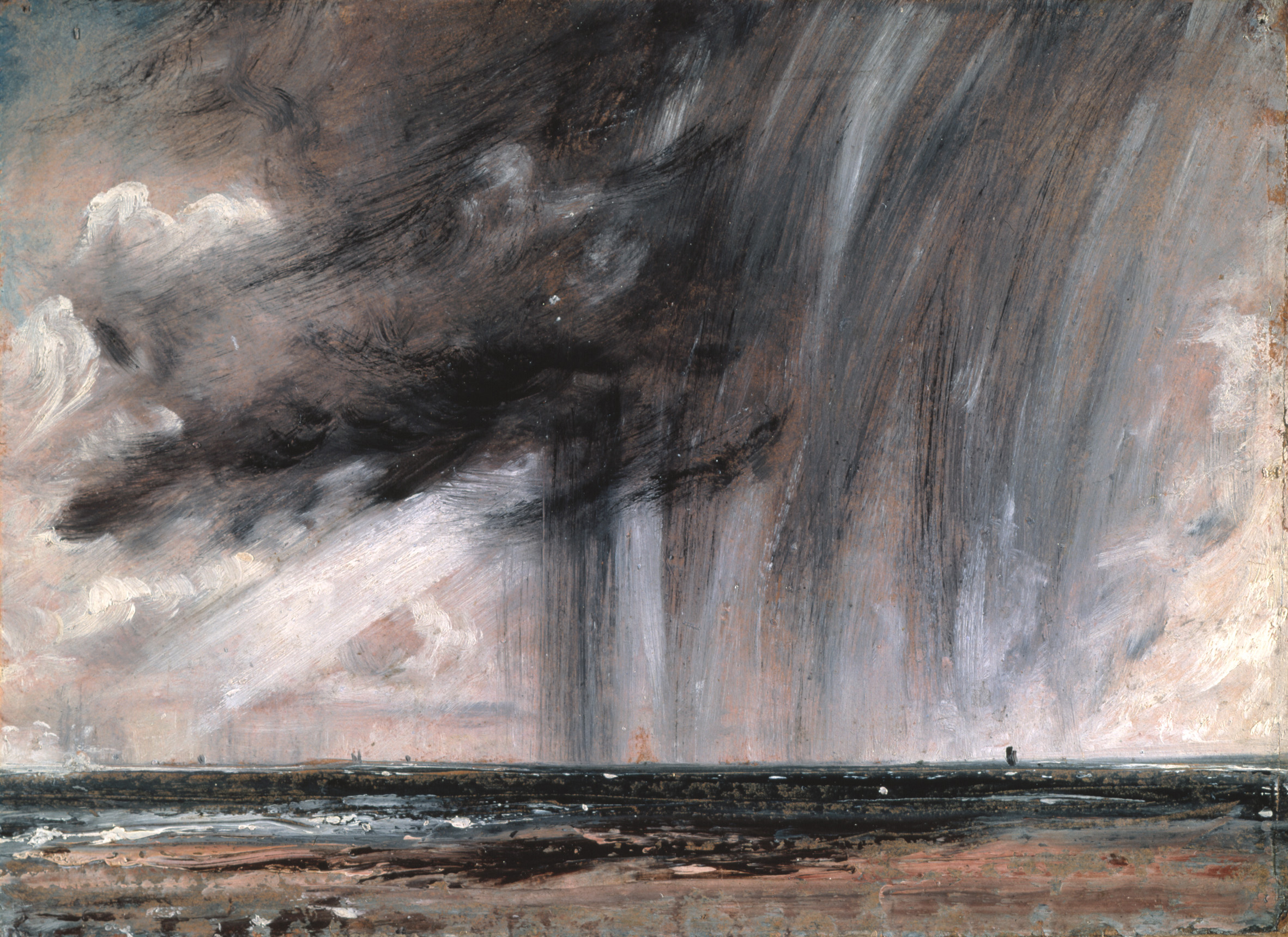
Seascape Study with Rain Cloud (c.1824). Royal Academy of Arts, London.

The sketches themselves were the first ever done in oils directly from the subject in the open air, with the notable exception of the oil sketches Pierre-Henri de Valenciennes made in Rome around 1780. To convey the effects of light and movement, Constable used broken brushstrokes, often in small touches, which he scumbled over lighter passages, creating an impression of sparkling light enveloping the entire landscape. One of the most expressionistic and powerful of all his studies is Seascape Study with Rain Cloud, painted about 1824 at Brighton, which captures with slashing dark brushstrokes the immediacy of an exploding cumulus shower at sea. Constable also became interested in painting rainbow effects, for example in Salisbury Cathedral from the Meadows, 1831, and in Cottage at East Bergholt, 1833.

To the sky studies he added notes, often on the back of the sketches, of the prevailing weather conditions, direction of light, and time of day, believing that the sky was "the key note, the standard of scale, and the chief organ of sentiment" in a landscape painting. In this habit he is known to have been influenced by the pioneering work of the meteorologist Luke Howard on the classification of clouds; Constable's annotations of his own copy of Researches About Atmospheric Phaenomena by Thomas Forster show him to have been fully abreast of meteorological terminology. "I have done a good deal of skying", Constable wrote to Fisher on 23 October 1821; "I am determined to conquer all difficulties, and that most arduous one among the rest".

Constable once wrote in a letter to Leslie, "My limited and abstracted art is to be found under every hedge, and in every lane, and therefore nobody thinks it worth picking up". He could never have imagined how influential his honest techniques would turn out to be. Constable's art inspired not only contemporaries like Géricault and Delacroix, but the Barbizon School, and the French impressionists of the late nineteenth century.

In 2019 two drawings by Constable were found among the possessions of the late playwright and poet, Christopher Fry; the drawings later sold for £60,000 and £32,000 at auction.

=== Gallery ===
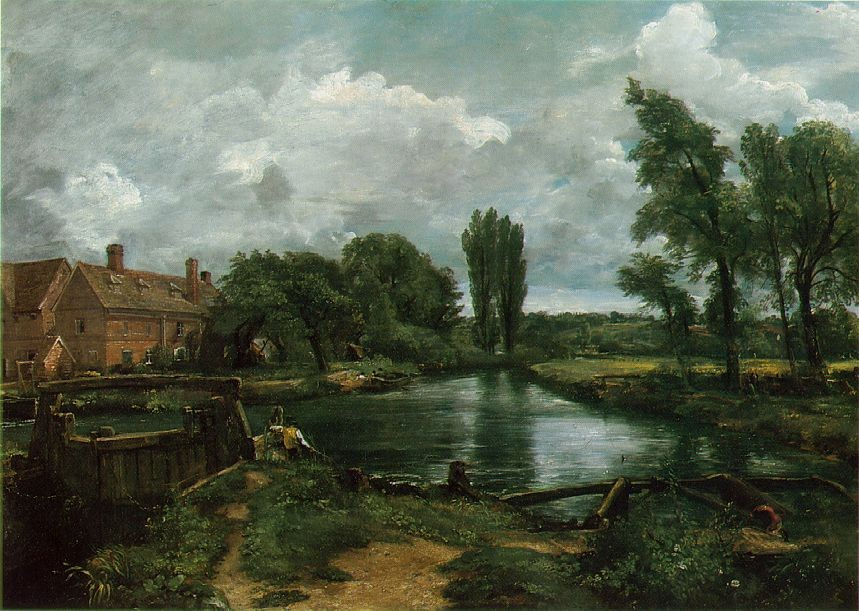
Flatford Mill from the Lock, oil on canvas, 1812, Private collection

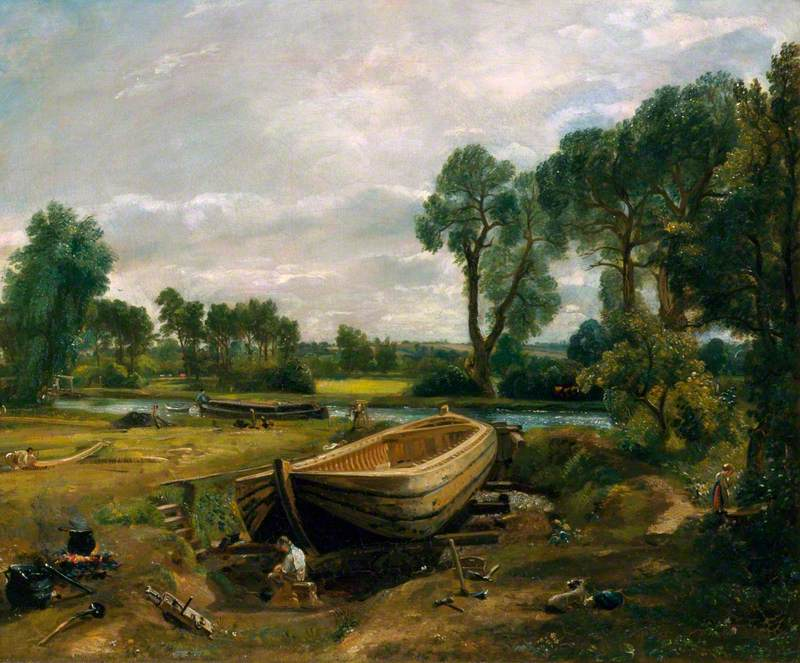
Boat-Building Near Flatford Mill, oil on canvas, 1815, Victoria and Albert Museum, London

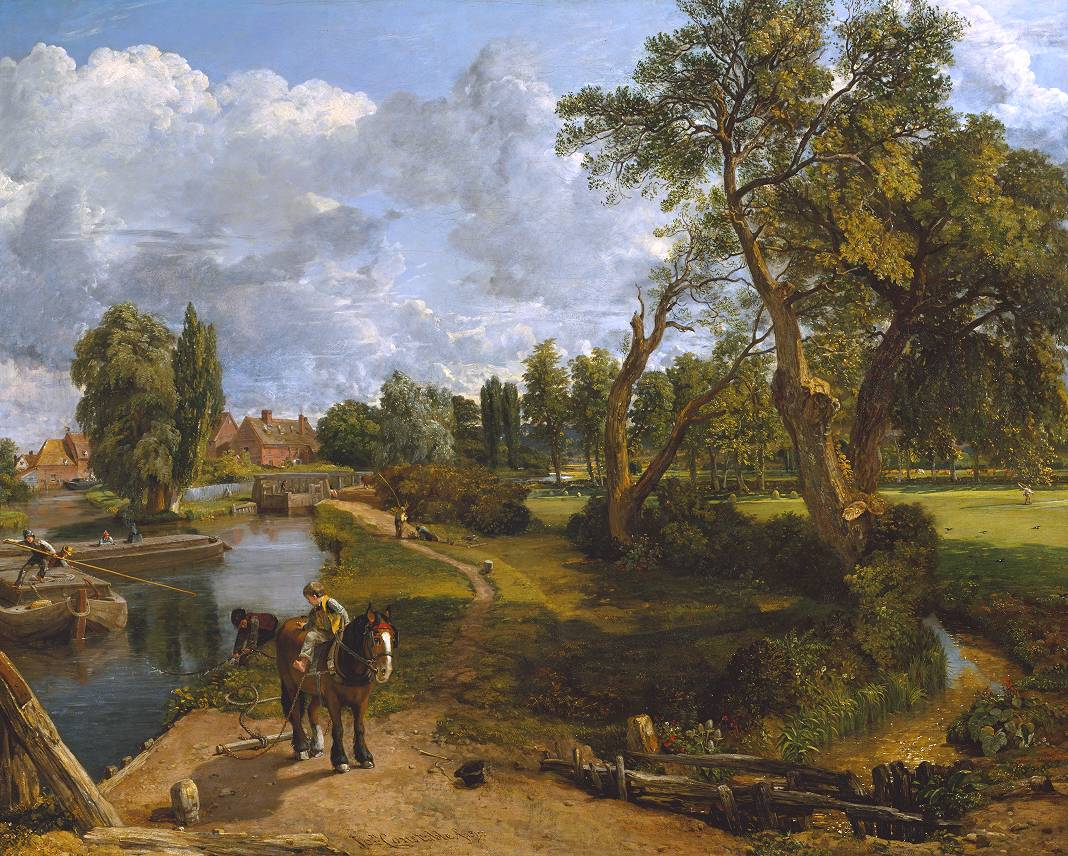
Flatford Mill, c. 1816, oil on canvas, Tate Britain, London

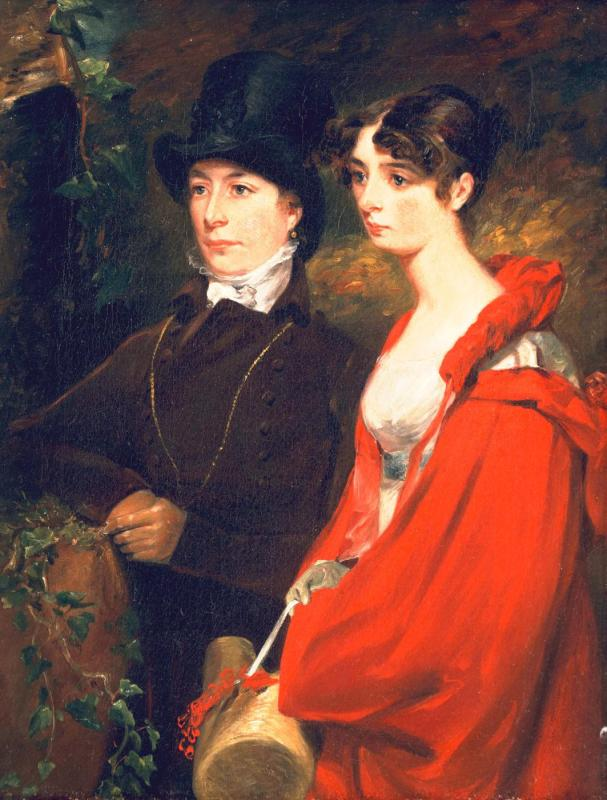
Anne and Mary Constable, oil on canvas, 1818, The Huntington Library, Art Museum, and Botanical Gardens

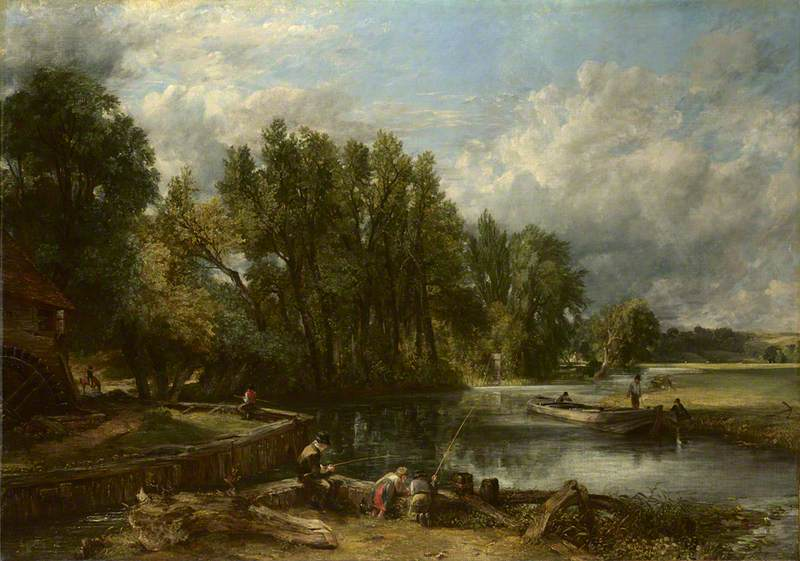
Stratford Mill, 1820, oil on canvas, National Gallery, London

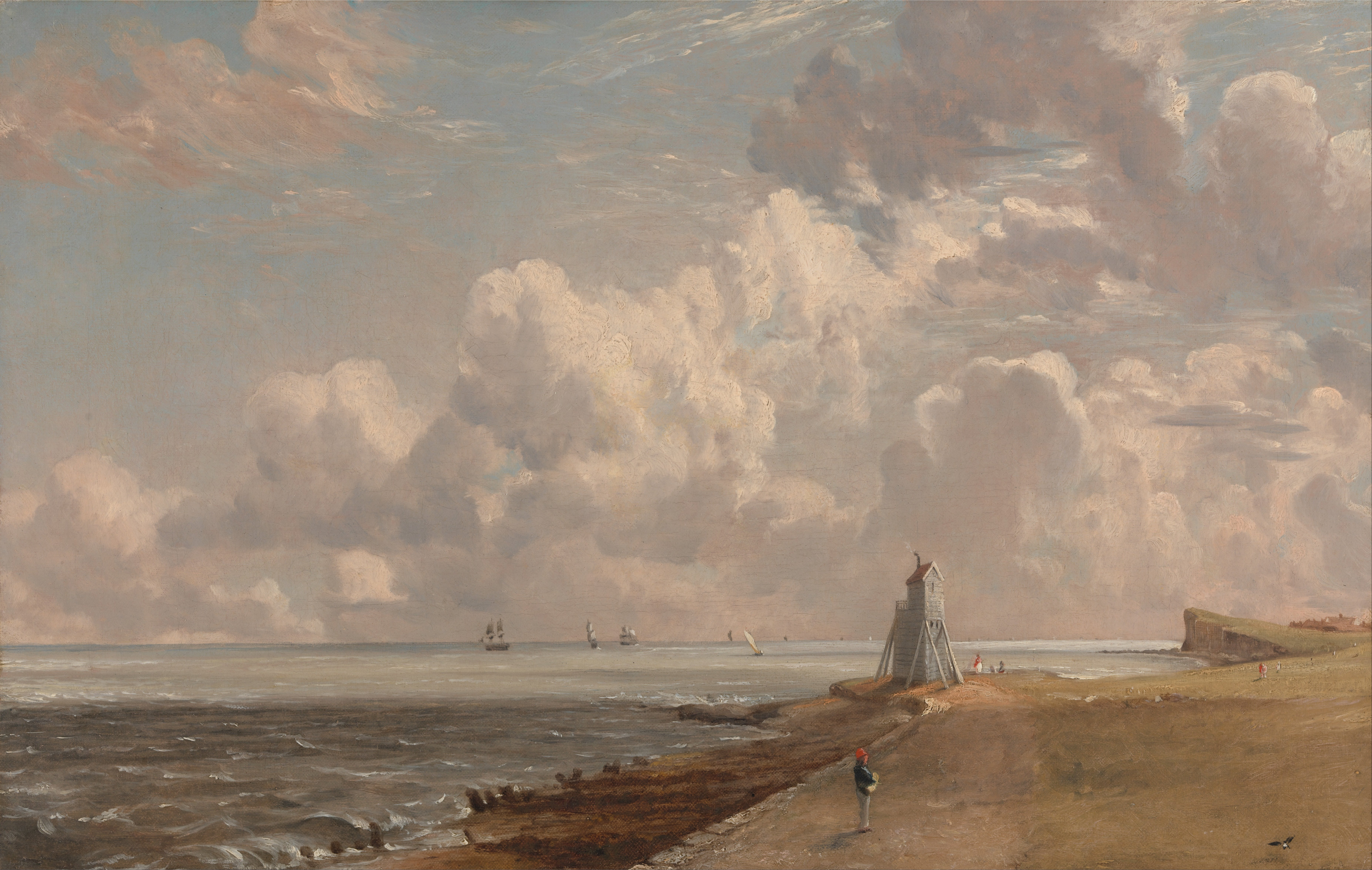
Harwich Lighthouse, oil on canvas, 1820, Yale Center for British Art, New Haven, Connecticut

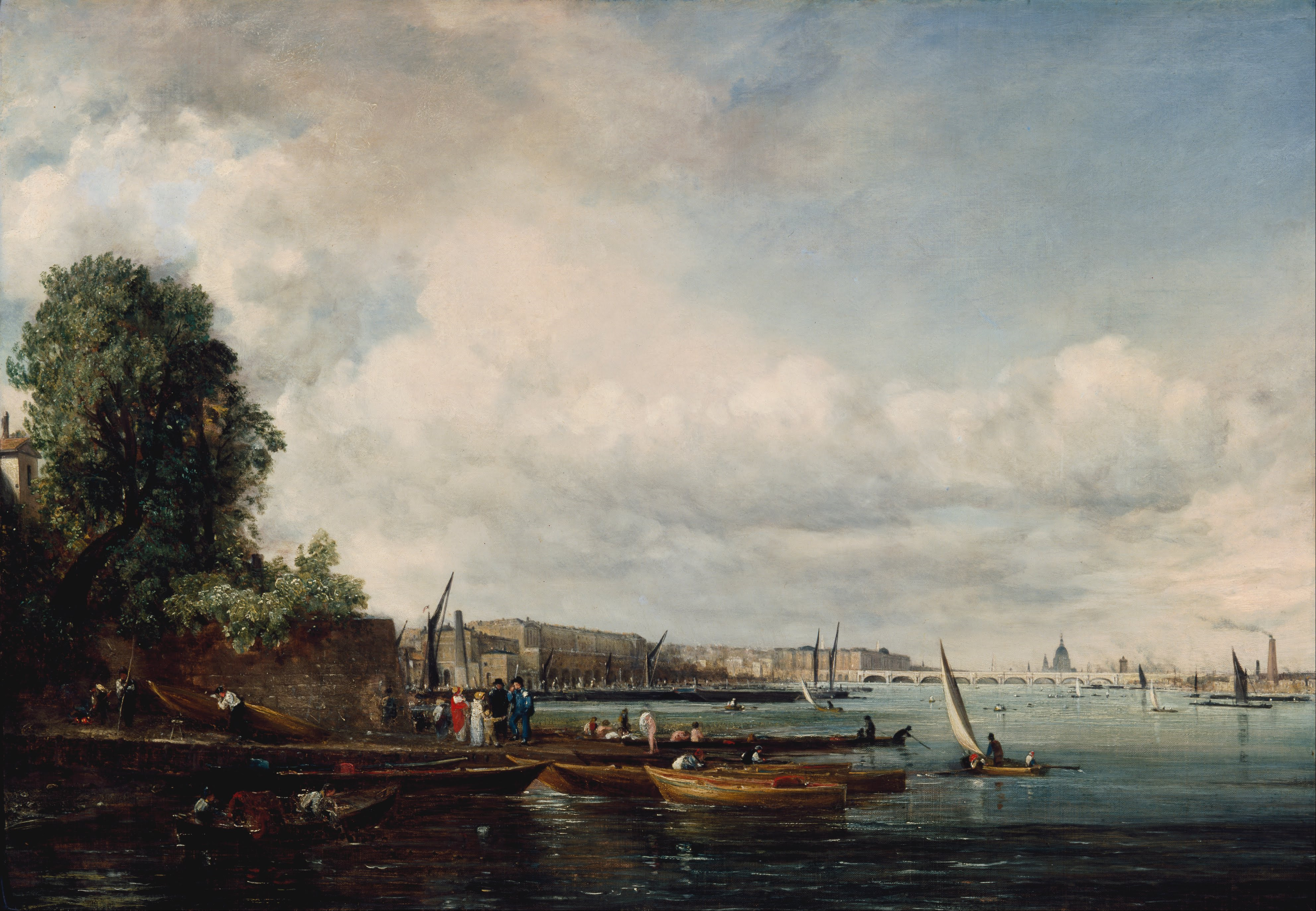
Waterloo Bridge, oil on canvas, 1820, Cincinnati Art Museum, Cincinnati, Ohio

Hampstead Heath with the Salt Box, oil on canvas, c.1820, Tate Britain, London

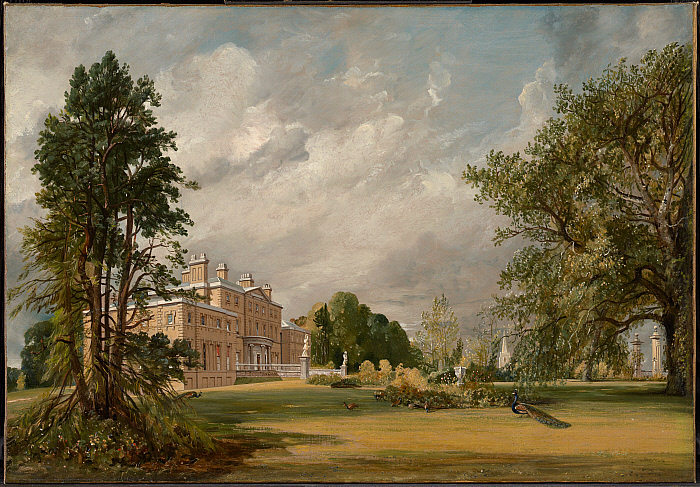
Malvern Hall (1821), oil on canvas, 21 5/16 x 30 13/16 in. (54.1 x 78.3 cm), Clark Art Institute, Williamstown, Massachusetts

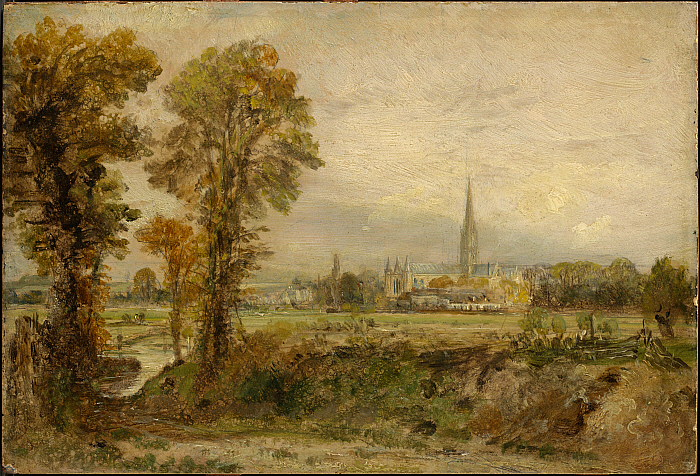
Distant View of Salisbury Cathedral (1821), oil on panel, 6 13/16 x 10 1/16 in. (17.3 x 25.6 cm), Clark Art Institute, Williamstown, Massachusetts

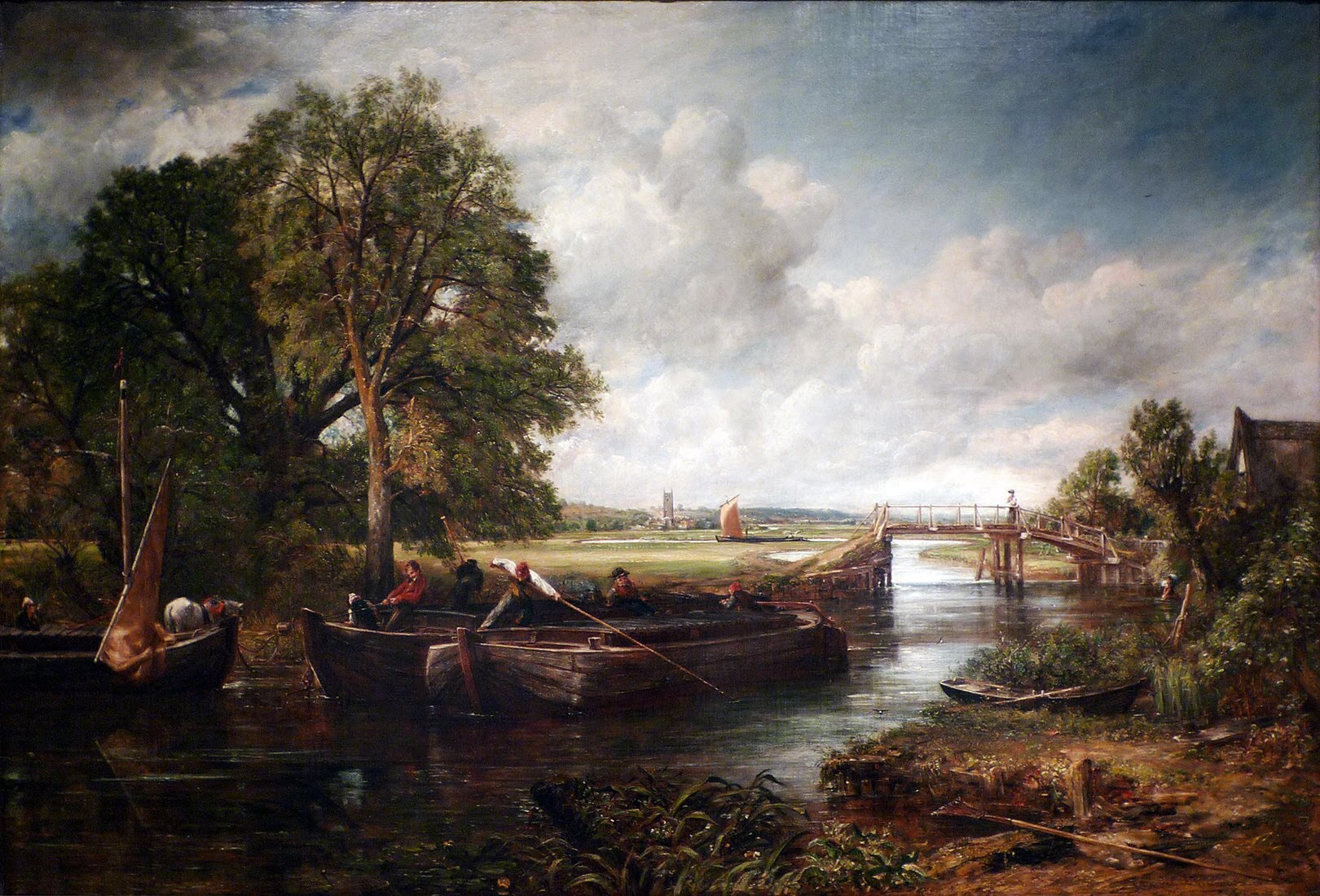
View on the Stour near Dedham, 1822, oil on canvas, Huntington Library, Los Angeles County, California

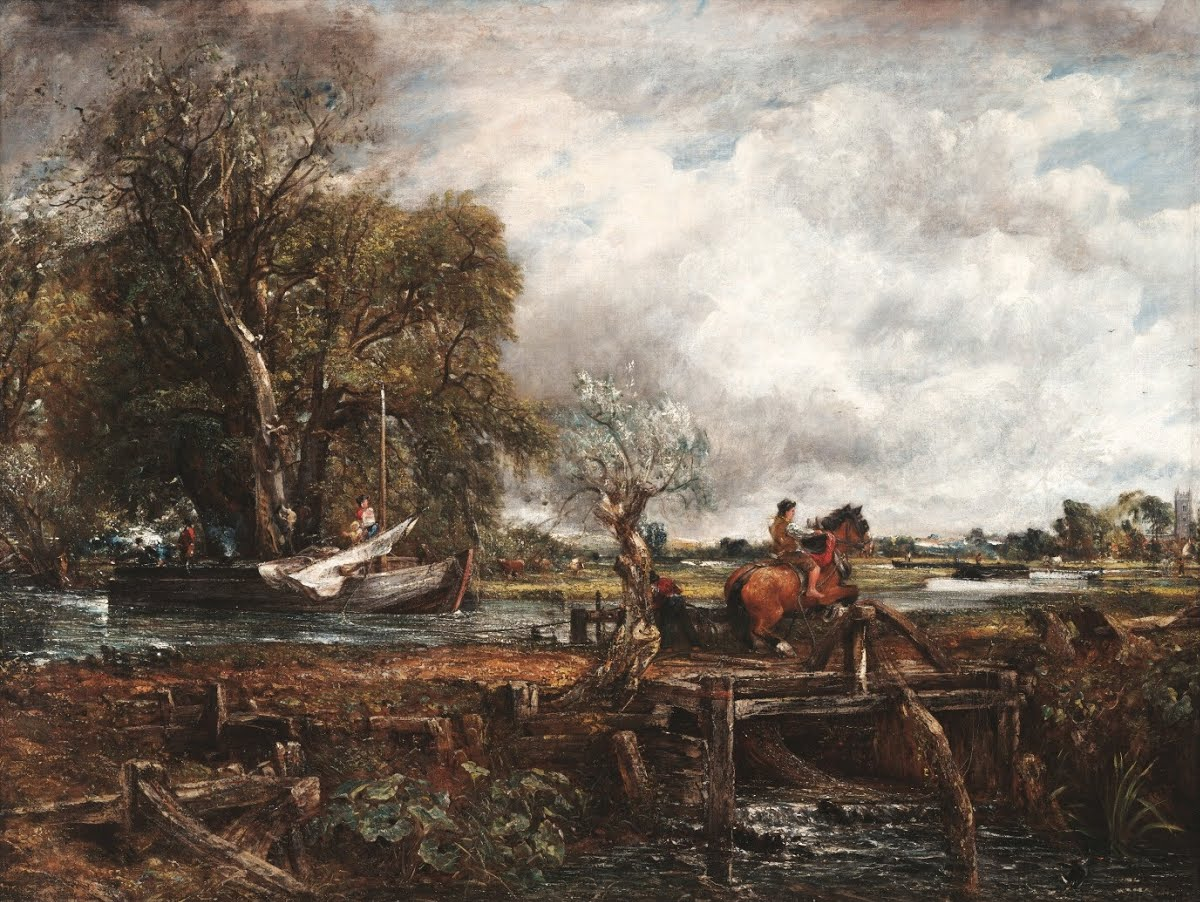
The Leaping Horse, 1825, oil on canvas, Royal Academy of Arts, London

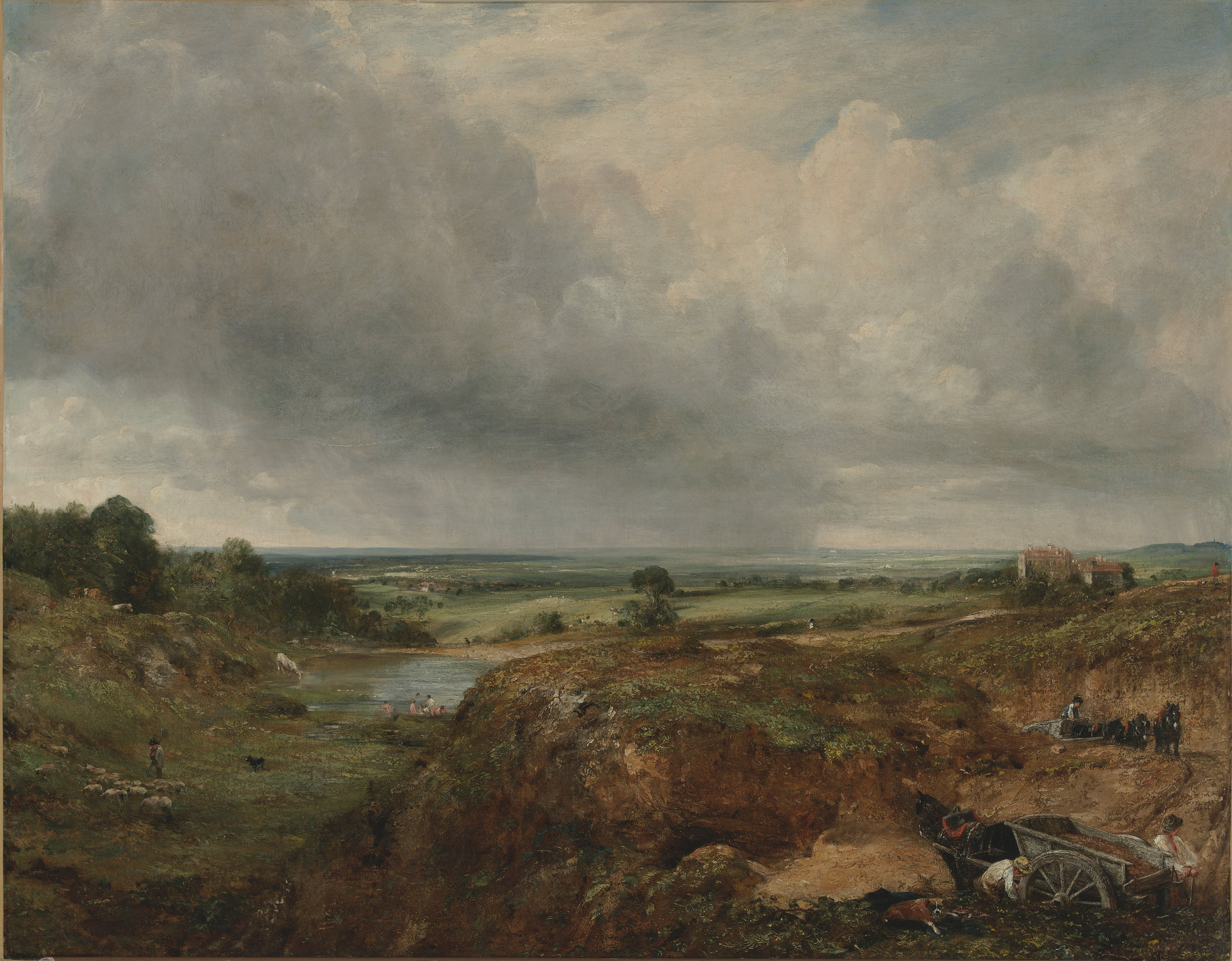
Branch Hill Pond, Hampstead Heath, oil on canvas, 1825, Virginia Museum of Fine Arts, Richmond, Virginia

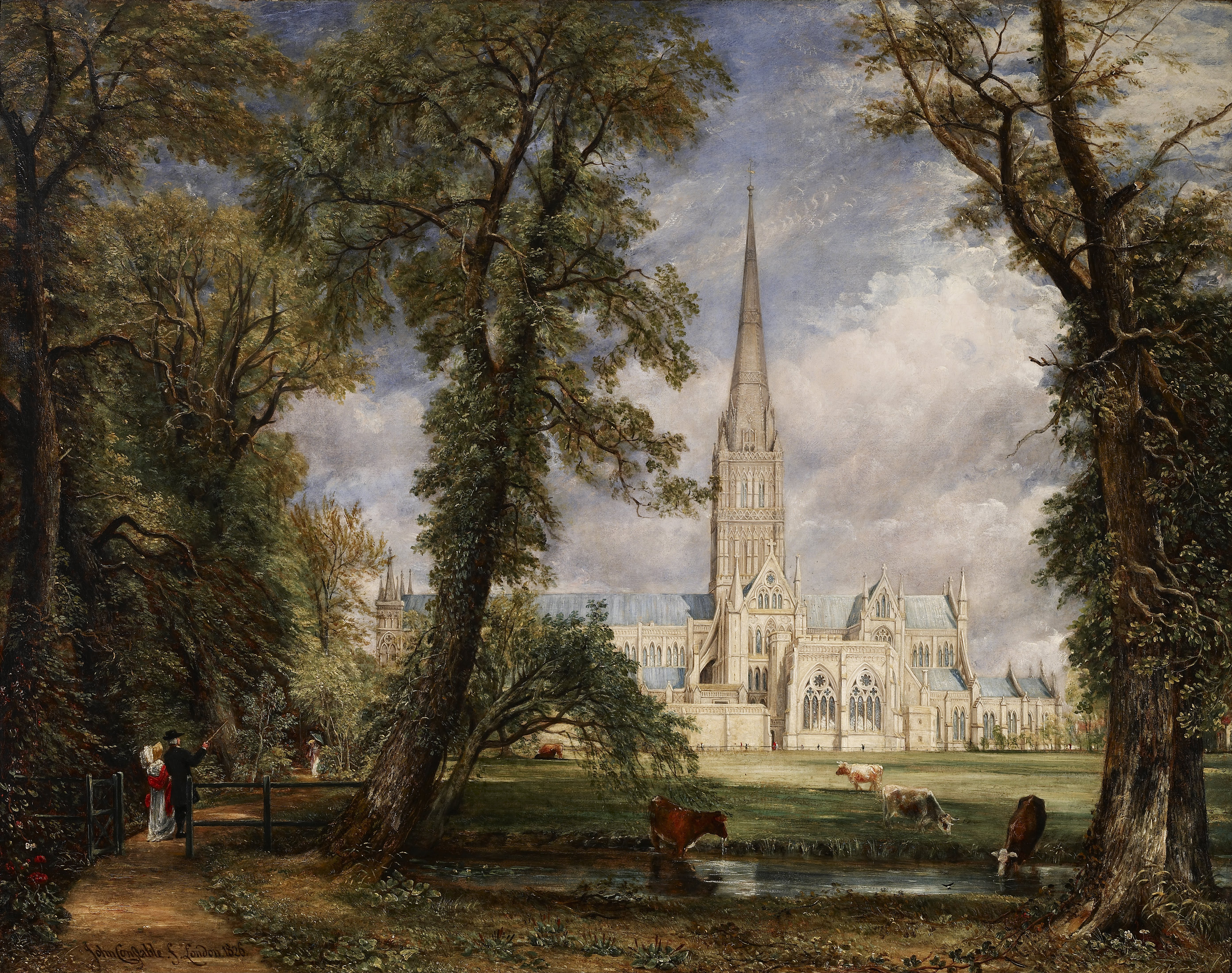
Salisbury Cathedral from the Bishop's Grounds, oil on canvas, c. 1825. As a gesture of appreciation for John Fisher, the Bishop of Salisbury, who commissioned this painting, Constable included the Bishop and his wife in the bottom left corner. Frick Collection, New York City

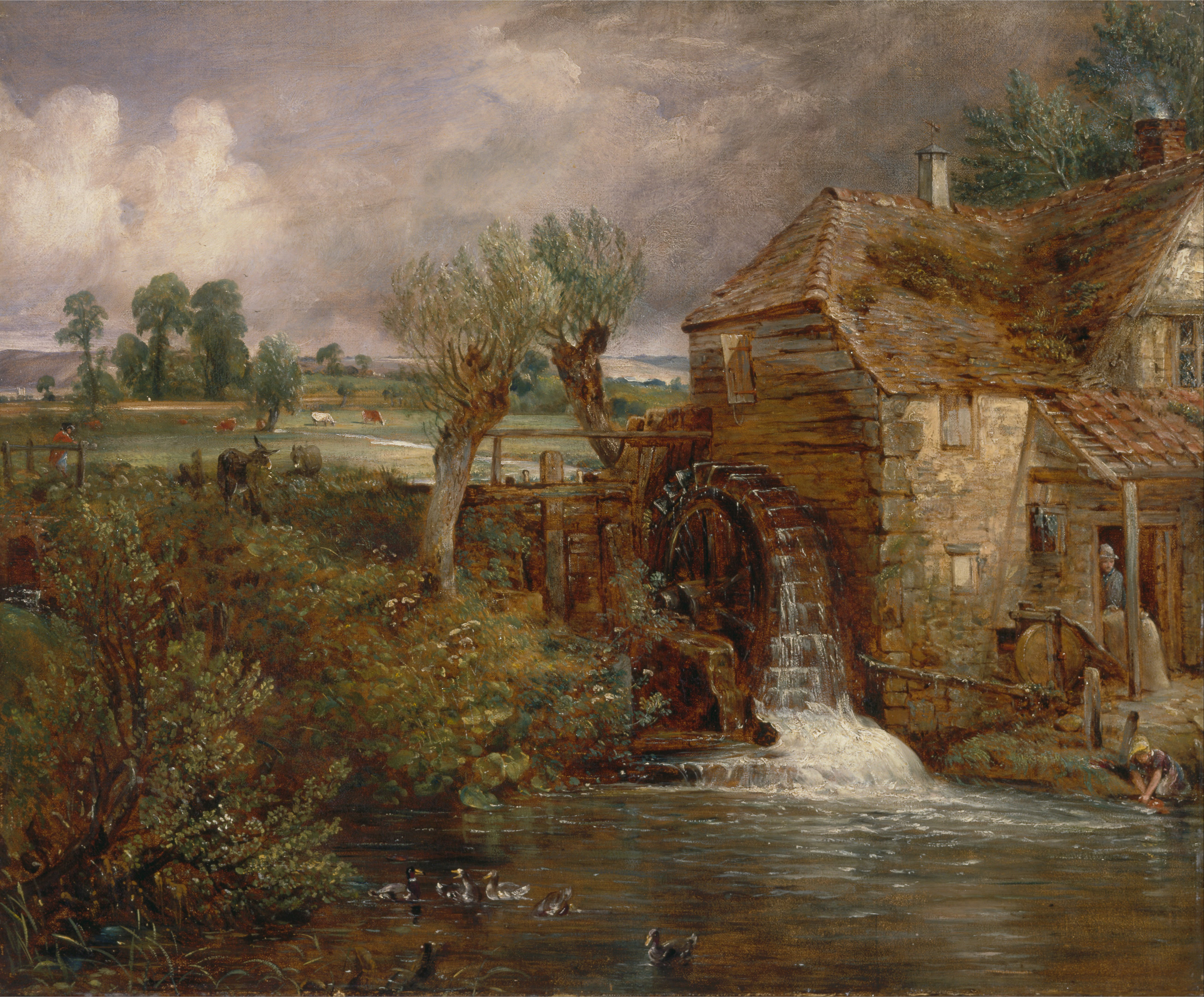
Parham Mill, 1826, oil on canvas, Yale Center for British Art, New Haven, Connecticut

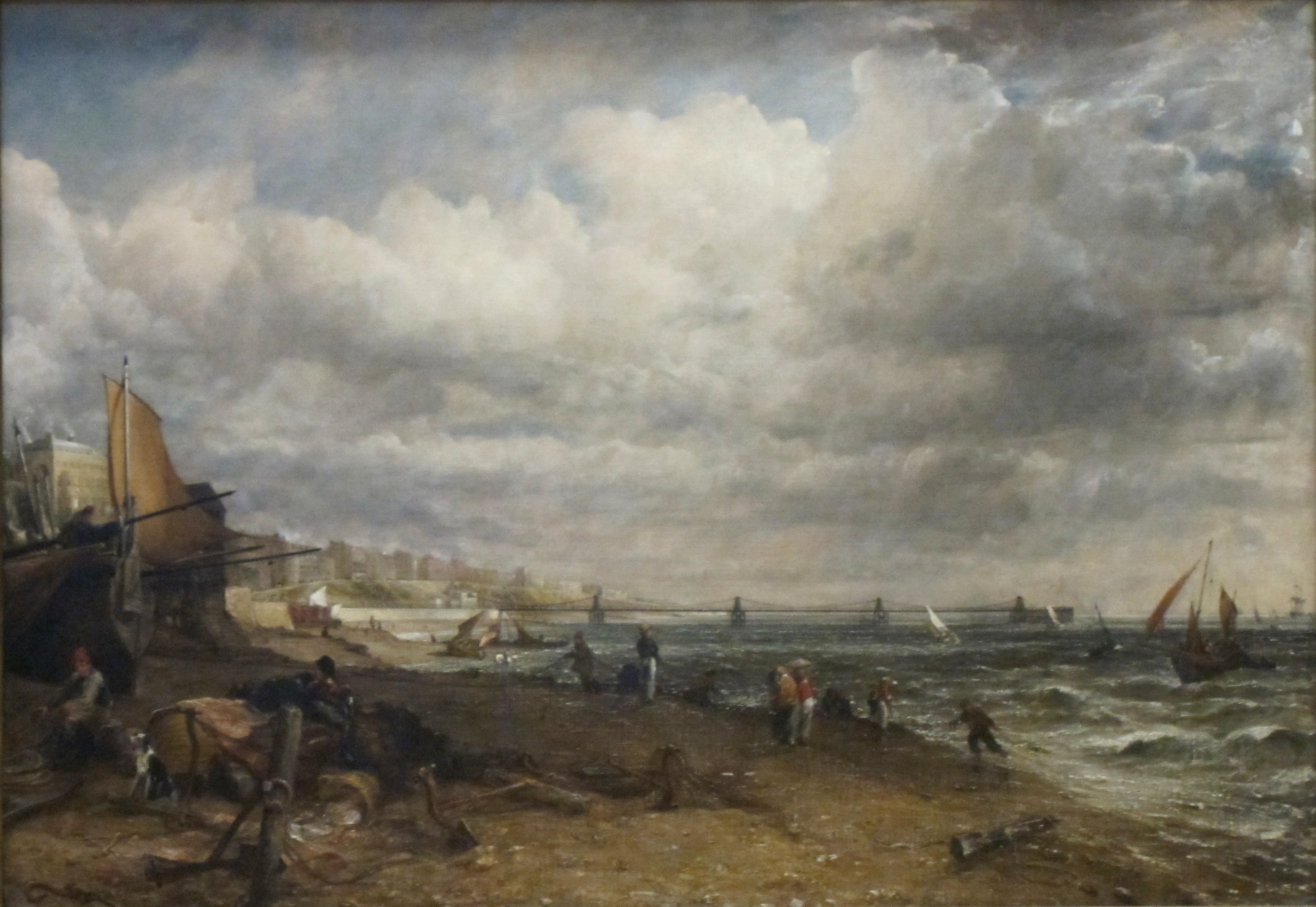
Chain Pier, Brighton, 1826–27, oil on canvas, Tate Britain, London

Vale of Health, Hampstead, oil on canvas, c. 1827, Victoria and Albert Museum, London

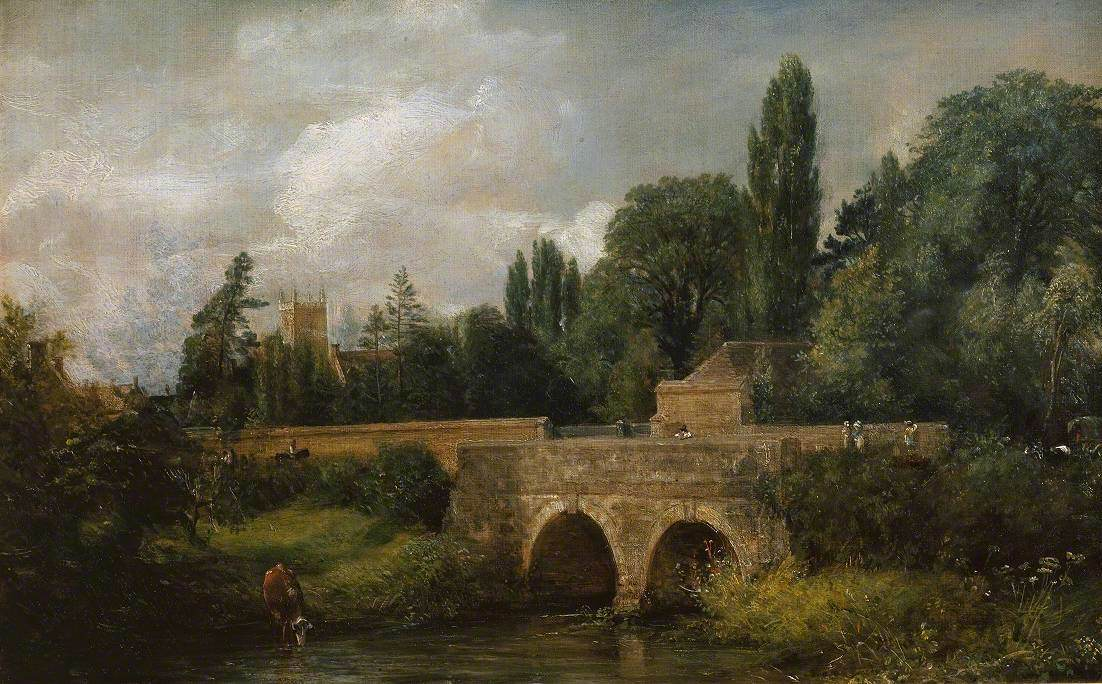
Gillingham Bridge, Dorset, oil on canvas, 1823, Tat Britain, London

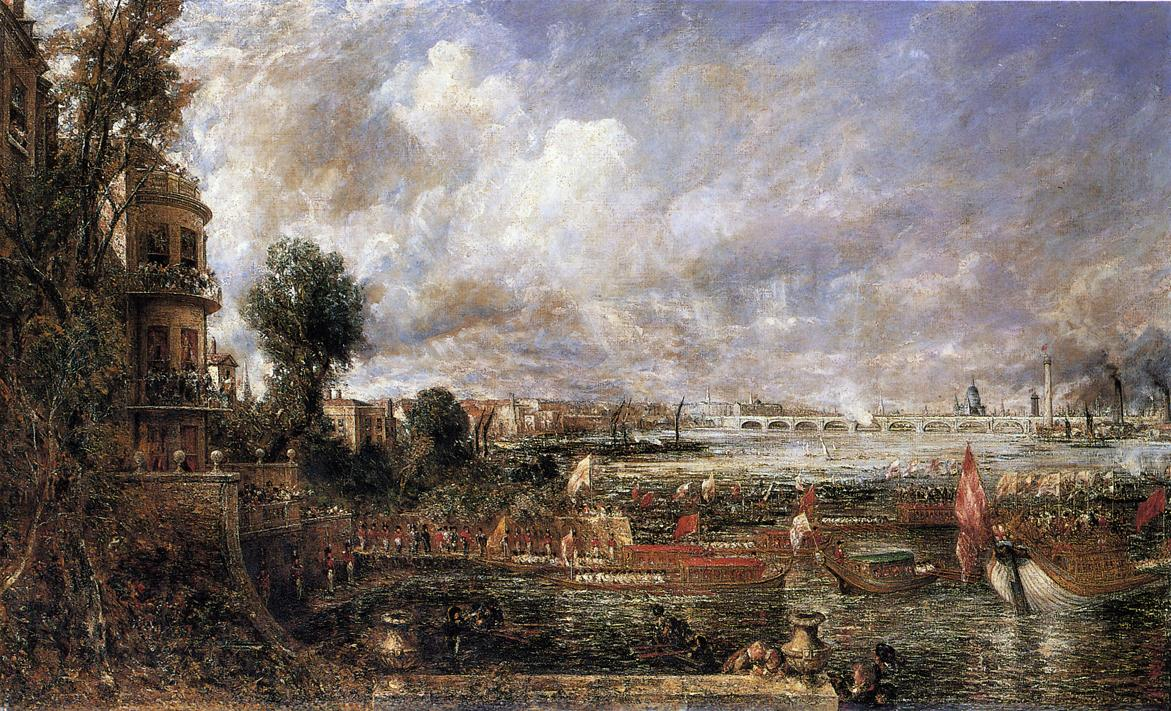
The Opening of Waterloo Bridge, oil on canvas, c. 1832. Tate Britain, London

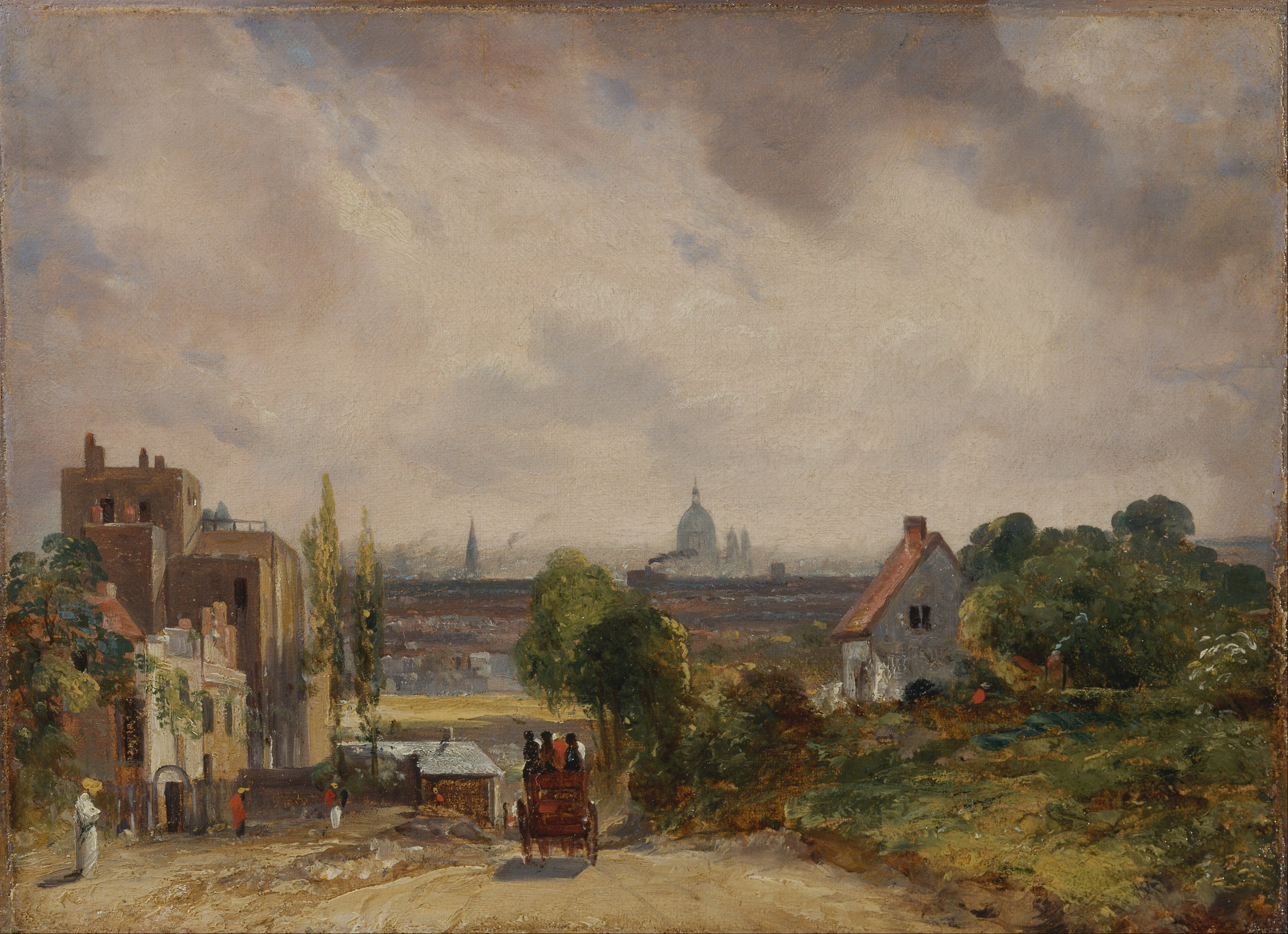
Sir Richard Steele's Cottage, Hampstead, oil on canvas, 1832, Yale Center for British Art, New Haven, Connecticut

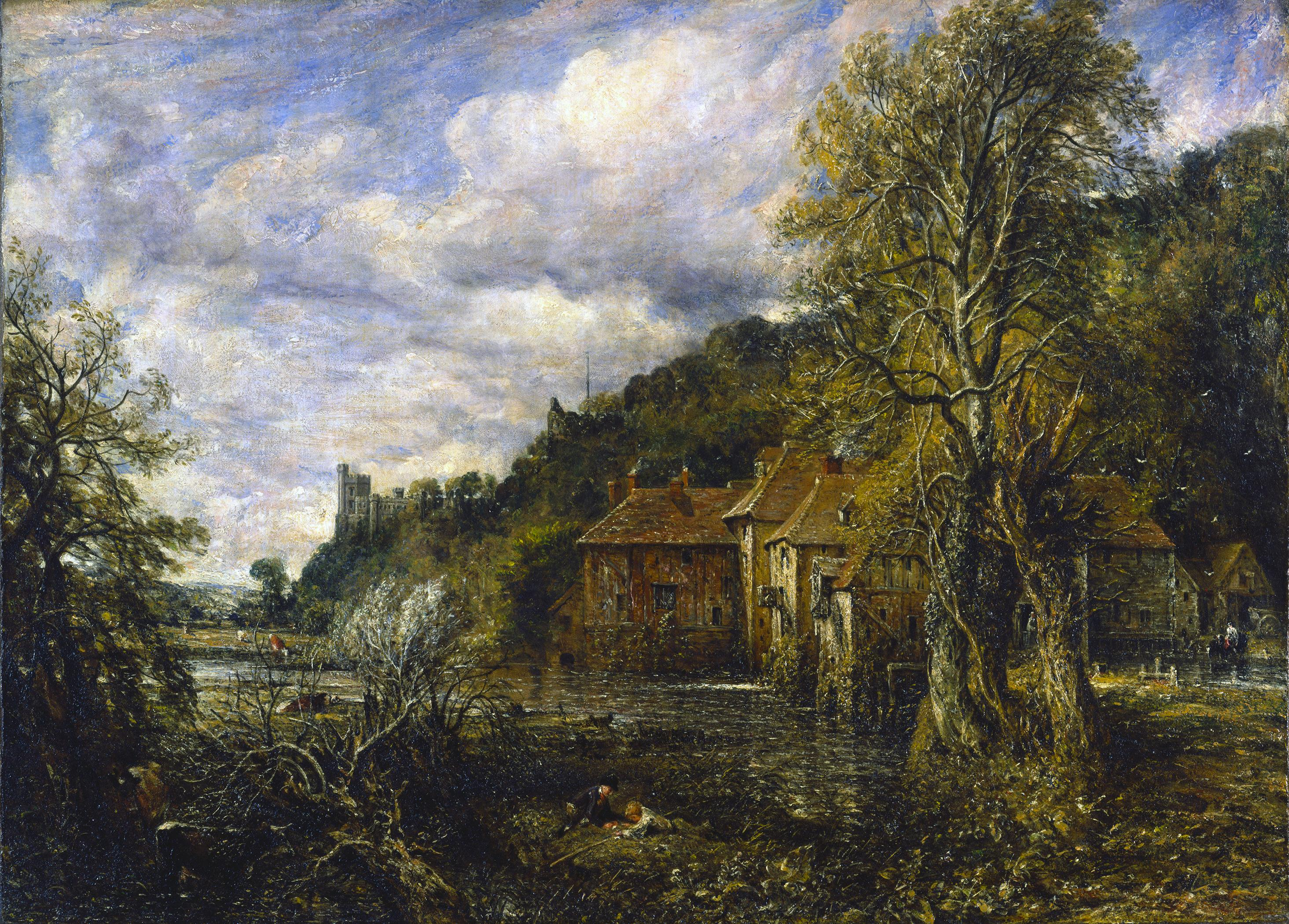
Arundel Mill and Castle, oil on canvas, 1837, Toledo Museum of Art, Toledo, Ohio

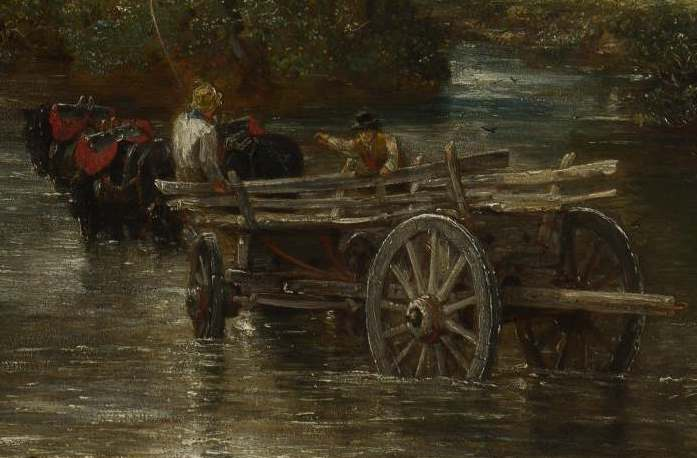
A detail of The Hay Wain, oil on canvas, 1821, National Gallery, London

== Selected paintings ==
- Dedham Vale (1802) – Victoria and Albert Museum, London
- The Stour (1810) – Philadelphia Museum of Art
- Landscape: Two Boys Fishing (1813) – Anglesey Abbey, Cambs, NT
- Landscape: Ploughing Scene in Suffolk (1814, revised c. 1816 and 1831) – Yale Center for British Art, New Haven
- The Mill Stream, Flatford (1814) – Christchurch Mansion, Ipswich
- The Stour Valley And Dedham Village (1814–1815) – Museum of Fine Arts, Boston
- Boat-Building Near Flatford Mill (1815) – Victoria and Albert Museum, London
- Golding Constable's Flower Garden (1815) – Christchurch Mansion, Ipswich
- Golding Constable's Kitchen Garden (1815) – Christchurch Mansion, Ipswich
- Portrait of Maria Bicknell, Mrs. John Constable (1816) – Tate Britain, London
- Wivenhoe Park, Essex (1816) – National Gallery of Art, Washington, D.C.
- The Quarters behind Alresford Hall (1816) – National Gallery of Victoria, Melbourne
- Flatford Mill (original title Scene on a Navigable River) (1816) – Tate Britain, London
- Two Donkeys (1816) – Philadelphia Museum of Art
- Weymouth Bay: Bowleaze Cove and Jordon Hill (1816–17) – National Gallery, London
- A Cottage in a Cornfield (1817) – National Museum Cardiff
- Weymouth Bay with Approaching Storm (1819) – Louvre, Paris
- The White Horse (A Scene on the River Stour) (1819) – Frick Collection, New York City
- Harwich- The Low Lighthouse and Beacon Hill (1820) – Yale Center for British Art, New Haven
- Hampstead Heath (1820) – Fitzwilliam Museum, Cambridge
- Dedham Lock and Mill (1820) – Victoria and Albert Museum, London
- Stratford Mill (1820) – National Gallery, London
- The Hay Wain (original title Landscape: Noon; 1821) – National Gallery, London
- The Grove, or the Admiral's House in Hampstead (1821–22) – Alte Nationalgalerie, Berlin
- View on the Stour near Dedham (1822) – The Huntington Library, San Marino, CA
- Salisbury Cathedral from the Bishop's Grounds (1823) – Victoria and Albert Museum, London
- The Lock (1824) – Private Collection
- Seascape Study with Rain Clouds (1824–25) – Royal Academy of Arts, London
- Brighton Beach (c. 1824–26) – Dunedin Public Art Gallery, Dunedin
- The Leaping Horse (1825) – Royal Academy of Arts, London
- Salisbury Cathedral from the Bishop's Grounds (1825) – Frick Collection, New York City
- The Cornfield (1826) – National Gallery, London
- Chain Pier, Brighton (1827) – Tate Britain, London
- The Vale of Dedham (1828) – National Gallery of Scotland, Edinburgh
- Hadleigh Castle (1829) – Yale Center for British Art and sketch Tate Britain
- Salisbury Cathedral from the Meadows (1831) – Tate Britain, London
- Sir Richard Steele's Cottage, Hampstead (1832) – Yale Center for British Art
- The Opening of Waterloo Bridge (1832) – Tate Britain, London
- The Valley Farm (1835) – Tate Britain, London
- Stonehenge (1835) – Victoria and Albert Museum, London
- Hampstead Heath with a Rainbow (1836) – Tate Britain, London
- Cenotaph to the Memory of Sir Joshua Reynolds (1836) – National Gallery, London
- Arundel Mill and Castle (c. 1836–37) – Toledo Museum of Art, Toledo, OH

== Bibliography ==
- Bailey, Anthony (2007), John Constable: A Kingdom of His Own, London: Vintage, ISBN 978-1-84413-833-3
- Beckett, Ronald B. (1970). John Constable's Correspondence VI: The Fishers. Ipswich: Suffolk Records Society. ISBN 08-5229-077-2.
- Charles, Victoria (2015), Constable, New York: Parkstone International, ISBN 978-1-78042-954-0
- Constable, Freda (1975), John Constable, Lavenham: Terence Dalton, ISBN 0-900963-54-9
- Constable, John (1970). Beckett, R. B. (ed.). John Constable's Discourses. Ipswich: Suffolk Records Society.
- Cormack, Malcolm (1986), Constable, Oxford: Phaidon, ISBN 0-7148-2350-3
- Fleming-Williams, Ian (1976), Constable: Landscape Watercolours & Drawings, London: Tate, ISBN 0-905005-10-4
- Fleming-Williams, Ian; Parris, Leslie (1984), The Discovery of Constable, London: Hamish Hamilton, ISBN 0-241-11248-6
- Fraser, John Lloyd (1976), John Constable: 1776–1837, Newton Abbot, UK: Readers Union, ISBN 0-09-125540-6
- Gayford, Martin (2009), Constable in Love: Love, Landscape, Money and the Making of a Great Painter, Fig Tree
- Hamilton, James (2022), Constable: A Portrait, Weidenfeld & Nicolson, ISBN 978-1474612913
- Holmes, Charles John (2012), John Constable: Illustrated, The Bookmill, ISBN 978-0-9567303-6-7 Kindle
- Kelder, Diane (1980), The Great Book of French Impressionism, New York: Abbeville Press, ISBN 0-89659-151-4
- Johnson, Paul (1991), The Birth of the Modern: World Society 1815-1830, University of Michigan: HarperCollins, ISBN 9780060165741
- Leslie, C. R. (1995), Mayne, Jonathan (ed.), Memoirs of the Life of John Constable, London: Phaidon, ISBN 0-7148-3360-6
- Lyles, Anne, ed. (2006), Constable: The Great Landscapes, London: Tate Publishing, ISBN 1-85437-635-7
- Mayor, A. Hyatt (1980), Prints & People: A Social History of Printed Pictures, Princeton, N. J.: Princeton University Press, ISBN 0-691-00326-2
- Parkinson, Ronald (1998), John Constable: The Man and His Art, London: V&A, ISBN 1-85177-243-X
- Parris, Leslie; Fleming-Williams, Ian (1991), Constable, London: Tate, ISBN 1-85437-070-7
- Parris, Leslie; Fleming-Williams, Ian (1982), Lionel Constable, London: Tate, ISBN 0-905005-38-4
- Parris, Leslie; Fleming-Williams, Ian; Shields, Conal (1976), Constable: Paintings, Watercolours & Drawings, London: Tate Gallery, ISBN 0-905005-15-5
- Pool, Phoebe (1964), John Constable, London: Blandford, OCLC 3365016
- Reynolds, Graham (1976), Constable: The Natural Painter, St Albans, UK: Panther, ISBN 0-586-04401-9
- Reynolds, Graham (1983), Constable's England, New York, NY: Metropolitan Museum of Art, ISBN 9780870993350
- Rhyne, Charles (2006), "The Remarkable Story of the 'Six-Foot Sketches'", Constable: The Great Landscapes, ed. Anne Lyles, London: Tate, ISBN 978-1-85437-635-0
- Rhyne, Charles (1990), John Constable: Toward a Complete Chronology, Portland, Oregon: Author, ISBN 0-9627197-0-6
- Rosenthal, Michael (1987), Constable, London: Thames and Hudson, ISBN 0-500-20211-7
- Rosenthal, Michael (1983), Constable: The Painter and His Landscape, New Haven, CT.: Yale University Press, ISBN 0-300-03014-2
- Smart, Alastair; Brooks, Attfield (1976), Constable and His Country, London: Elek, ISBN 0-236-40011-8
- Sunderland, John (1986), Constable, London: Phaidon, ISBN 978-0-7148-2754-4
- Thornes, John E. (1999), John Constable's Skies, Birmingham: University of Birmingham Press, ISBN 1-902459-02-4
- Vaughan, William (2002), John Constable, London: Tate, ISBN 1-85437-434-6
- Walker, John (1979), Constable, London: Thames and Hudson, ISBN 0-500-09133-1
- Wilcox, Timothy (2011), Constable and Salisbury. The soul of landscape, London: Scala, ISBN 978-1-85759-678-6
