= Hampstead Heath (painting) =

Painting by John Constable

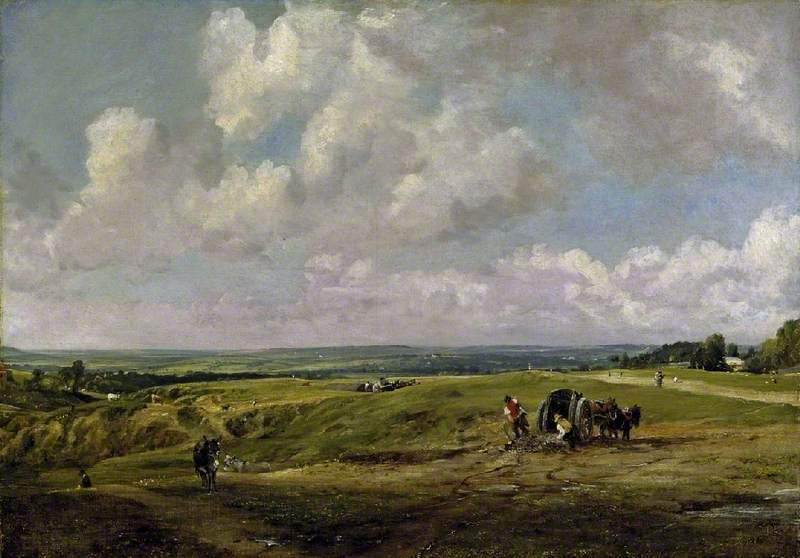
- Artist: John Constable
- Year: 1820
- Type: Oil on canvas, landscape painting
- Dimensions: 54 cm × 76.9 cm (21 in × 30.3 in)
- Location: Fitzwilliam Museum, Cambridge

Hampstead Heath is an 1820 landscape painting by the British artist John Constable. It depicts a view across Hampstead Heath in Middlesex, allowing the artist to illustrate the skies that fascinated him. In 1819 Constable moved to Hampstead, then located to the north of London, to help with the health of his wife Maria. Hampstead and its surroundings became a popular subject in his art. One of his earliest finished pictures from his spell as Hampstead, it shows a view towards Harrow from Whitestone Pond. A painting of the same size but facing in the opposite direction is in the Victoria and Albert Museum. The painting is today in the collection of the Fitzwilliam Museum in Cambridge, having been acquired in 1948.

== See also ==
- List of paintings by John Constable

== Bibliography ==
- Bailey, Anthony. John Constable: A Kingdom of his Own. Random House, 2012.
- Bermingham, Ann. Landscape and Ideology: The English Rustic Tradition, 1740-1860. University of California Press, 1996.
- Charles, Victoria. Constable. Parkstone International, 2015.
