= Portrait of Madame de Senonnes =

Painting by Jean-Auguste-Dominique Ingres

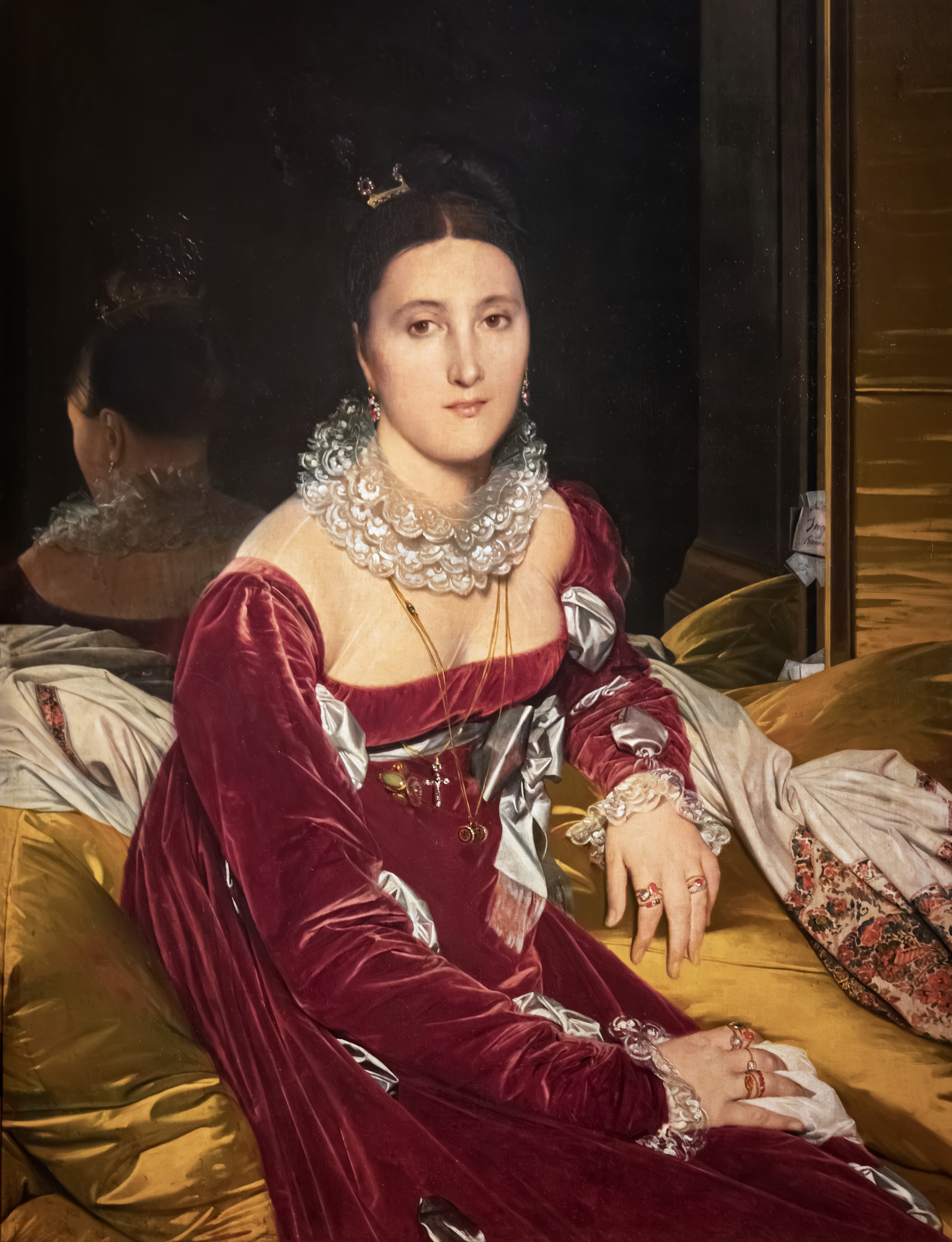
Portrait of Madame de Senonnes, 106 x 84 cm. Jean-Auguste-Dominique Ingres

Portrait of Madame de Senonnes (once known as La Trastéverine) is an 1816 painting by Jean-Auguste-Dominique Ingres. It shows Madame de Senonnes, née Marie-Genevieve-Marguerite Marcoz, viscountess of Senonnes (1783–1828). Marcoz was 31 when the portrait was completed. Ingres had earlier portrayed her in a drawing of 1813.

The portrait is considered one of Ingres' finest. Because she was significantly attractive and aristocratic, Ingres, who professed to disdain portraiture but who needed the income it provided, put great effort into the work in the hope of attracting other commissions. Portrait of Madame de Senonnes is part of the collection of Le tableau fait partie des collections at the Musée des Beaux-Arts de Nantes.

== Marie-Geneviève-Marguerite Marcoz ==
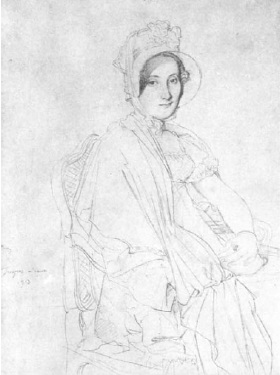
Marie Marcoz, 1813. Graphite on paper. 26.6 x 19.7 cm

Born into a relatively wealthy family, she married Jean Marcoz, a merchant draper, in 1802, and they moved to Rome in 1803, and had a daughter, Geneviève-Amélina Talensier that year. However, the marriage was unhappy, and they separated in 1809. Talensier left Rome to fight in the French army, and was wounded twice.

She began to socialise in artistic circles, passing herself off as Italian. Marcoz met Alexandre de La Motte-Baracé, Viscount of Senonne, and they married in 1815, the year after their return to France.

After her death in 1828, the portrait remained in the possession of her husband until 1831, when, pursued by creditors, he sent it to his elder brother, the Marquis de Senonnes, where it was kept in his castle in Feneu, in the west of France. The painting remained there until 1852, when it was sold to an art dealer. It was acquired in 1853 by the Musée des Beaux-Arts de Nantes for 4,000 francs.

== Description ==
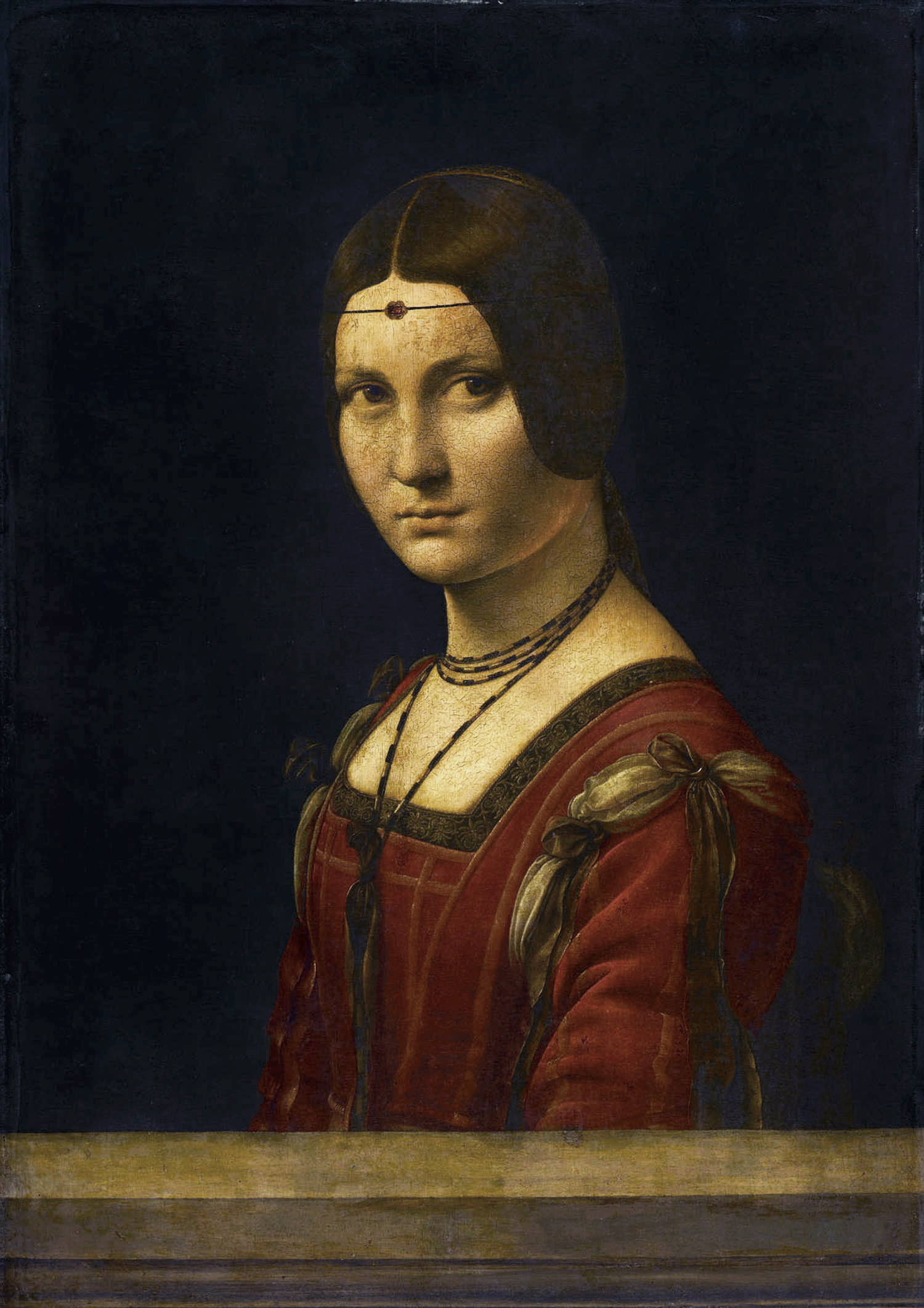
Leonardo da Vinci, La belle ferronnière, 1490–96

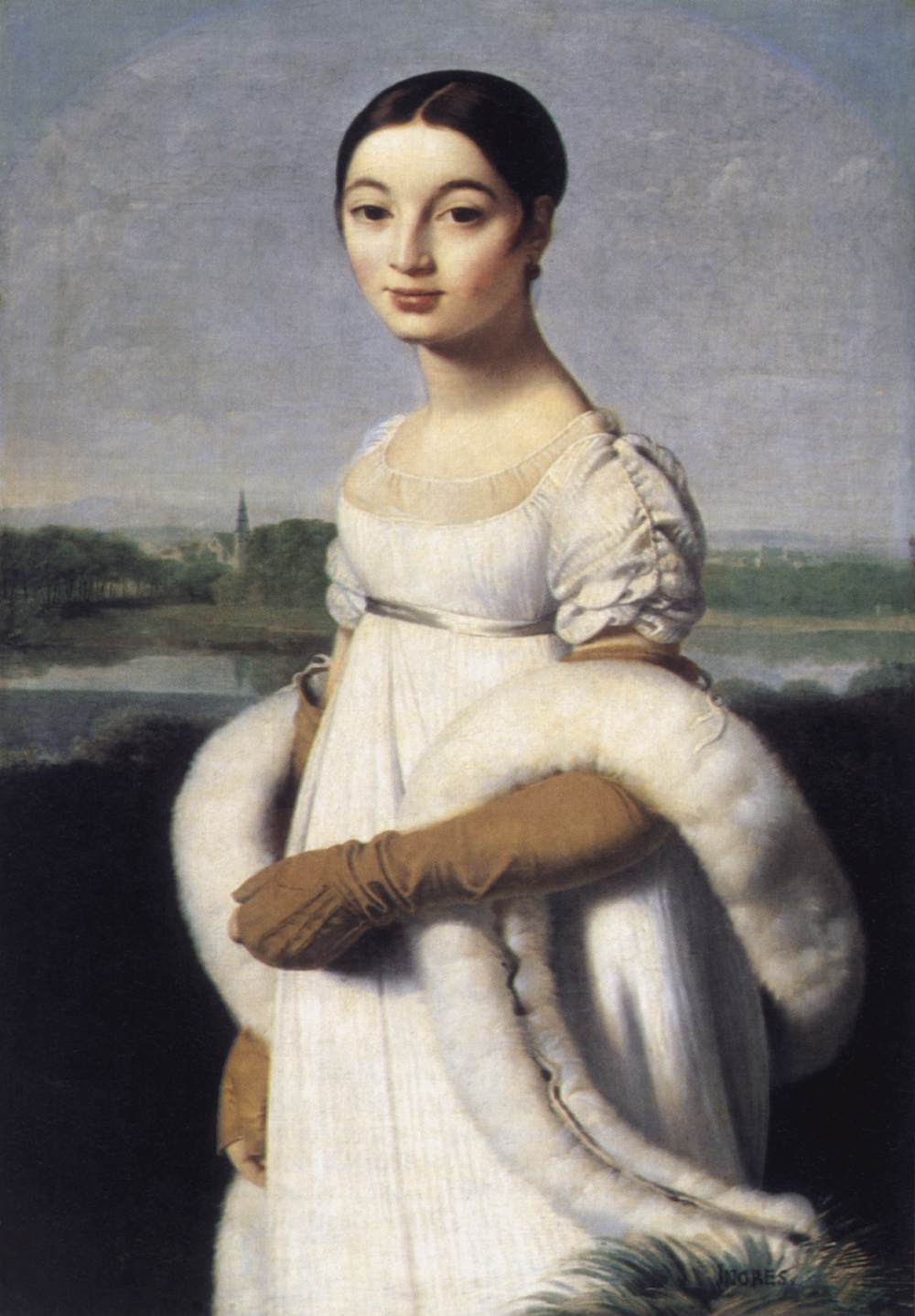
Ingres, Mademoiselle Caroline Rivière, 1805

Marcoz is shown in a seductive and languid pose on a sofa, her hair tightly pulled back. She is dressed in a low cut luxurious velvet gown trimmed with ochre, Indian muslin, a blond lace collar, and transparent lace, and with a white cashmere shawl. She is painted in bright red and gold colors, against a large, dark circular, mirror, lit by candle light, that reflects the back of her head and, especially, the curve of her neck. Her hands, which contain thirteen pale red and green jewel studded rings, caresses a white pillow and handkerchief. As with all of Ingres' female portraits, the sitter seems limbless, as if her body was not supported by a bone structure.

The work is Ingres' first to fully explore the use of a mirror, and the additional spatial space it allows, earlier seen but not as successfully, in the 1805 Mademoiselle Caroline Rivière.

His signature is written in the business tucked into the edge of the mirror. A number of small paper studies survive; the earliest of which show her reclining erotically on a sofa, the later sketches focus on the presentation of her upper body and chest. Some art historians have compared it in tone to his Grande Odalisque, which he was working on simultaneously.

Among the sources that Ingres took inspiration from were Jacques-Louis David's Portrait of madame de Verninac (1799), and Leonardo da Vinci's La belle ferronnière.

== Gallery ==
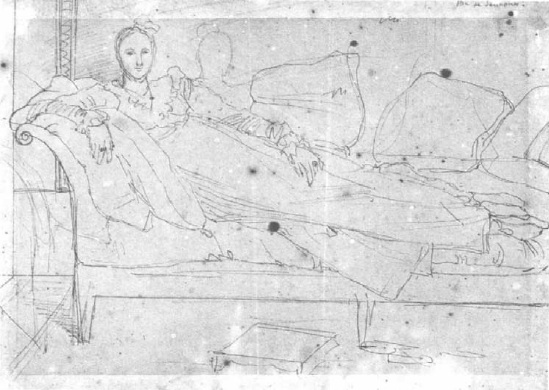
Study for a Portrait of Madame de Senonnes Ingres, 1813–14

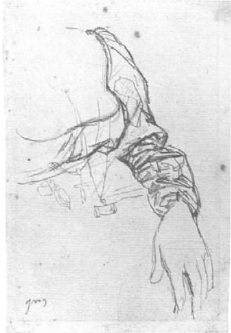
Study for a Portrait of Madame de Senonnes, graphite on paper, 1813–14

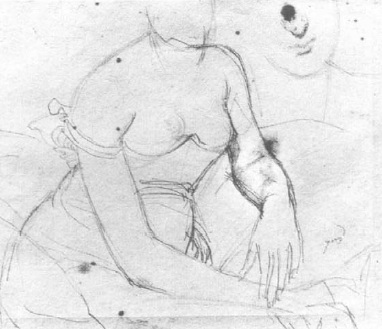
Study for a Portrait of Madame de Senonnes, graphite on paper, 1813–14

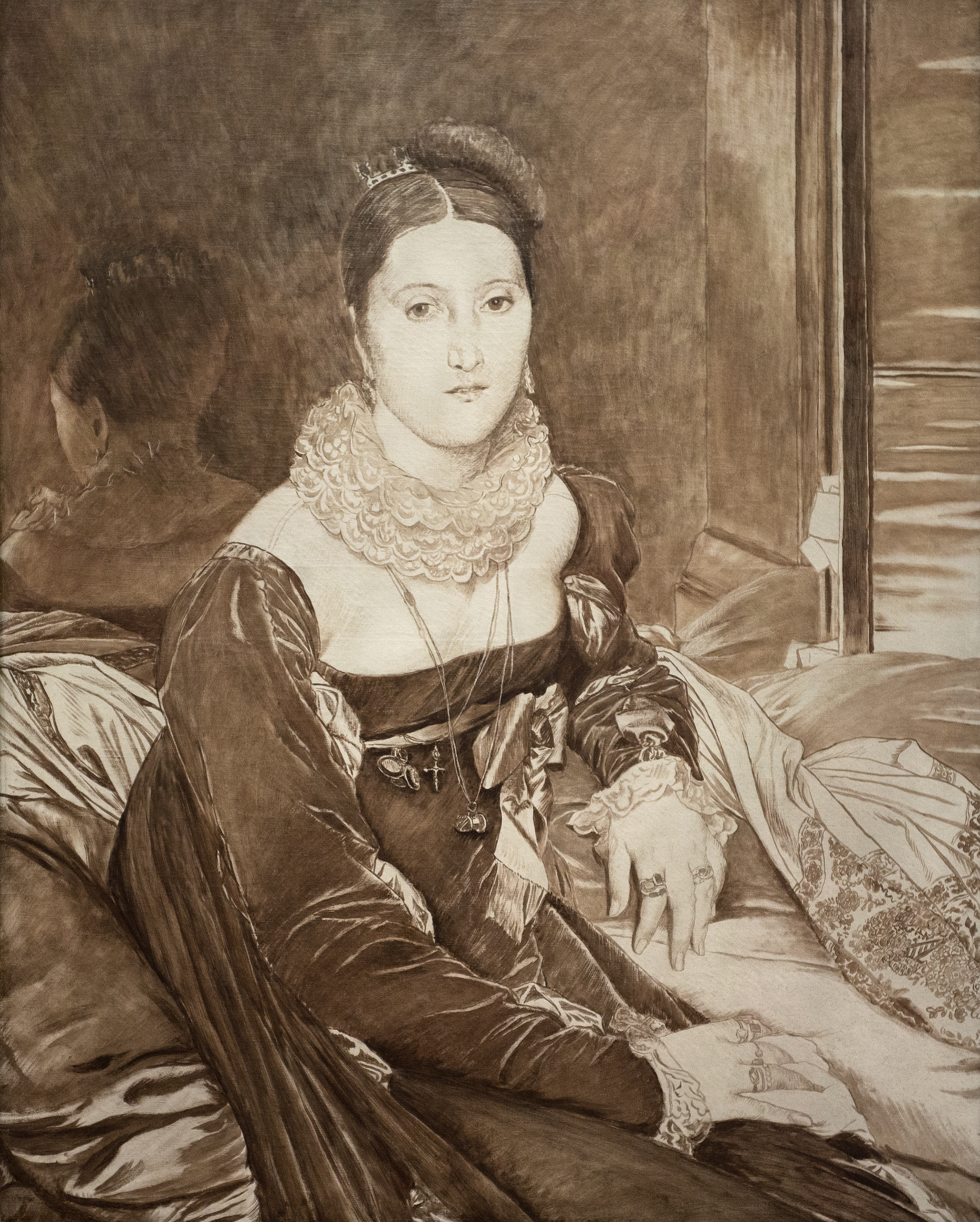
Copy in grisaille by James Tissot, 1899

== See also ==
- List of paintings by Jean-Auguste-Dominique Ingres
