= Salon of 1819 =

1819 art exhibition in Paris

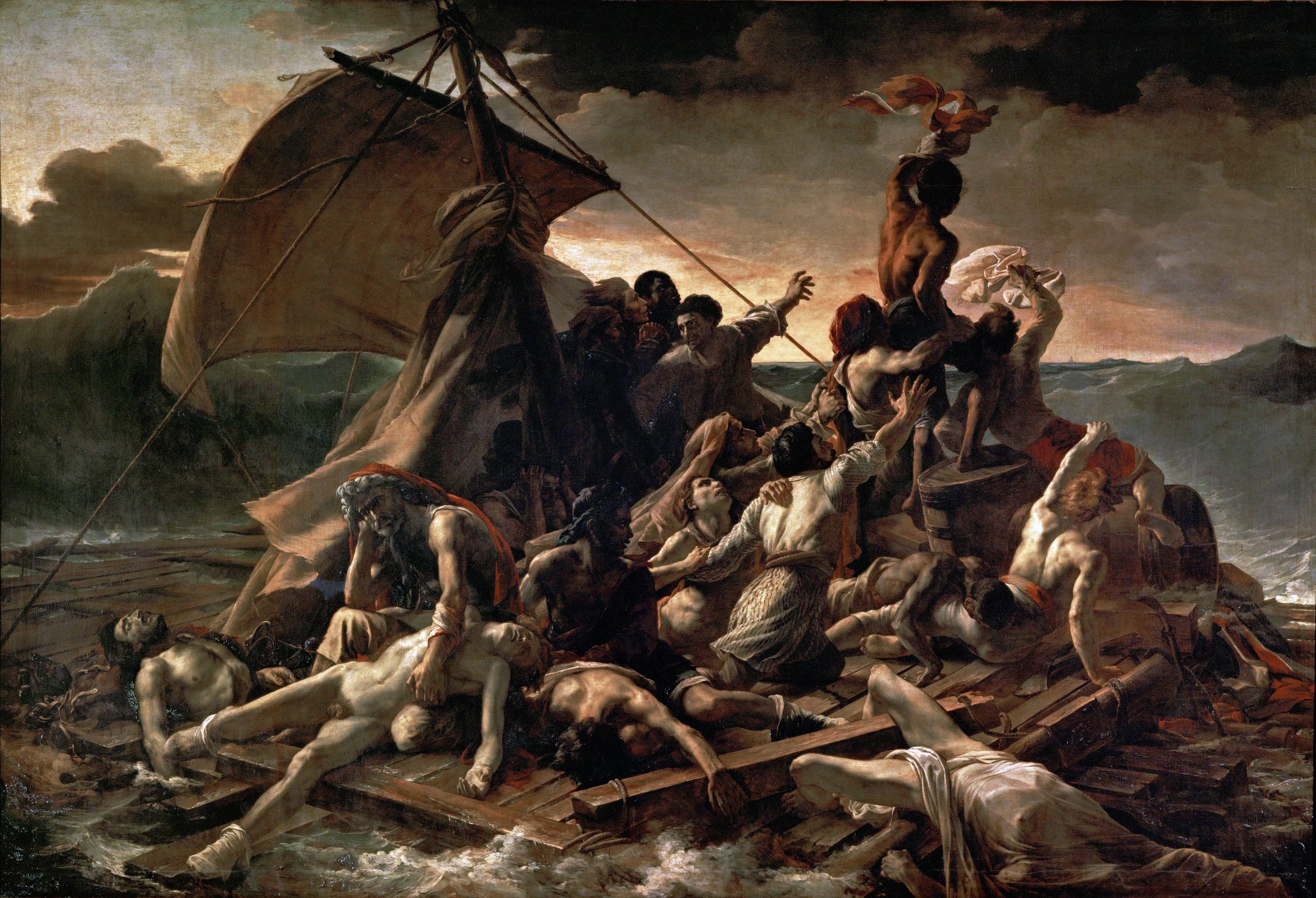
The Raft of the Medusa by Théodore Géricault

The Salon of 1819 was an art exhibition held at the Louvre in Paris between 25 August and 30 September 1819. It was the largest Salon to be staged since the fall of Napoleon. It took place during the Restoration era with Louis XVIII on the throne. It was the first to be held since the withdrawal of Allied Occupation forces from the country at the end of the previous year. The two officials behind the exhibition the Count Forbin and Vicomte de Senonnes set out to make it even more a celebration of the House of Bourbon than the previous Salon of 1817.

More than thirteen hundred paintings were displayed at the Salon. Over a hundred paintings were in the then fashionable Troubadour style including Roger Freeing Angelica by Jean-Auguste-Dominique Ingres. Ingres also displayed the history painting Philip V of Spain Investing Marshal Berwick with the Golden Fleece and Grande Odalisque which had originally been commissioned by Caroline Murat. Ingres felt he was harshly treated by critics at the Salon. Alexander the Great Visiting Apelles by Marie Nicolas Ponce-Camus was rejected from submission as the jury believed it alluded to a visit Napoleon had made to the studio of Jacques-Louis David during the Hundred Days. By contrast Horace Vernet's Massacre of the Mamelukes, taken to be a covert reference to the White Terror against Napoleon's supporters, was allowed to be displayed. Vernet exhibited a number of works at the Salon including The Dog of the Regiment Wounded.

Louis Hersent produced a popular history painting Gustave Vasa. Amongst others who exhibited was the rising star Ary Scheffer. The standout work was The Raft of the Medusa by Théodore Géricault depicting the shipwreck of the frigate Medusa.

== Gallery ==
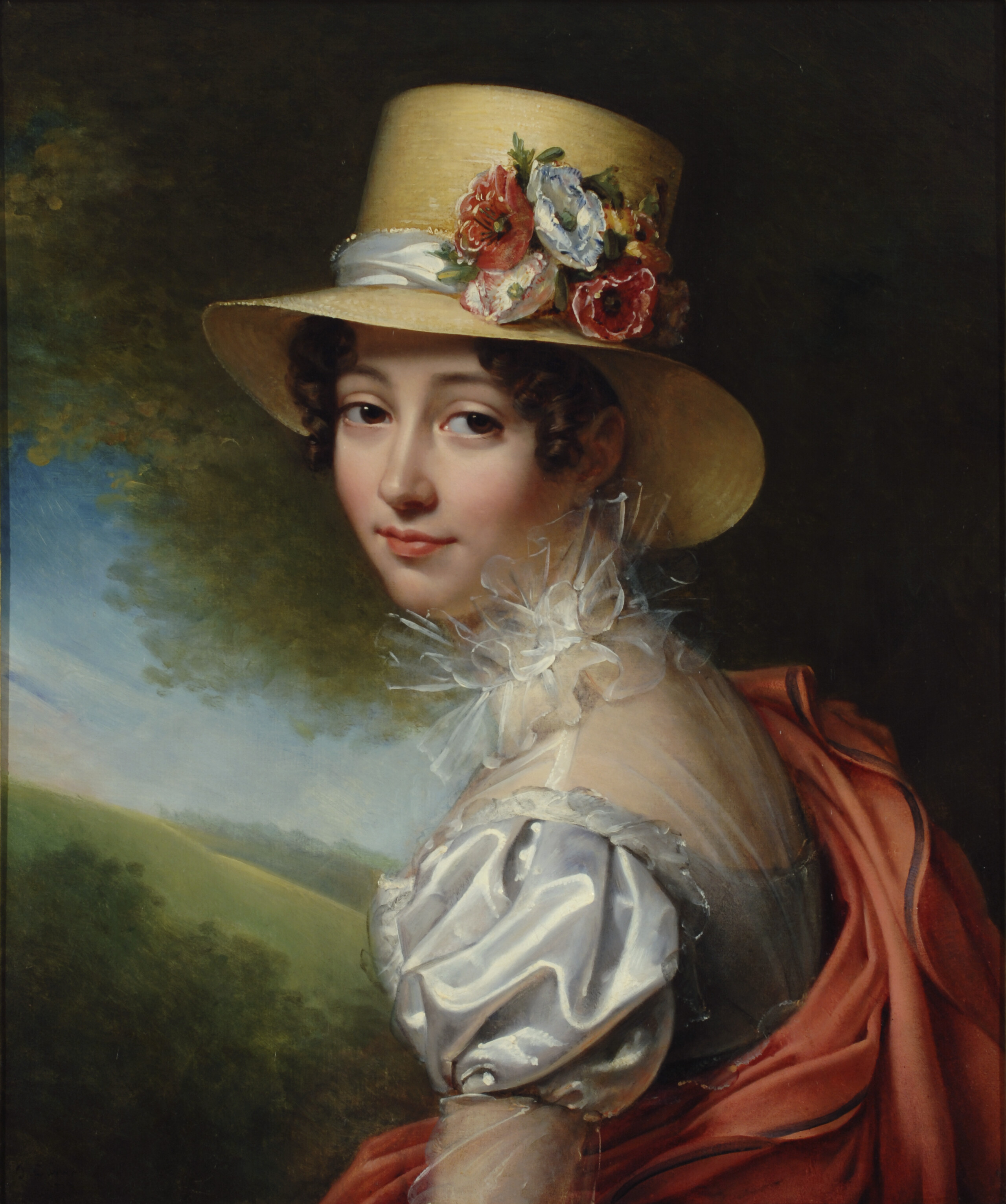
Portrait of Zoé Jacqueline Duvidal de Montferrier by Julie Hugo

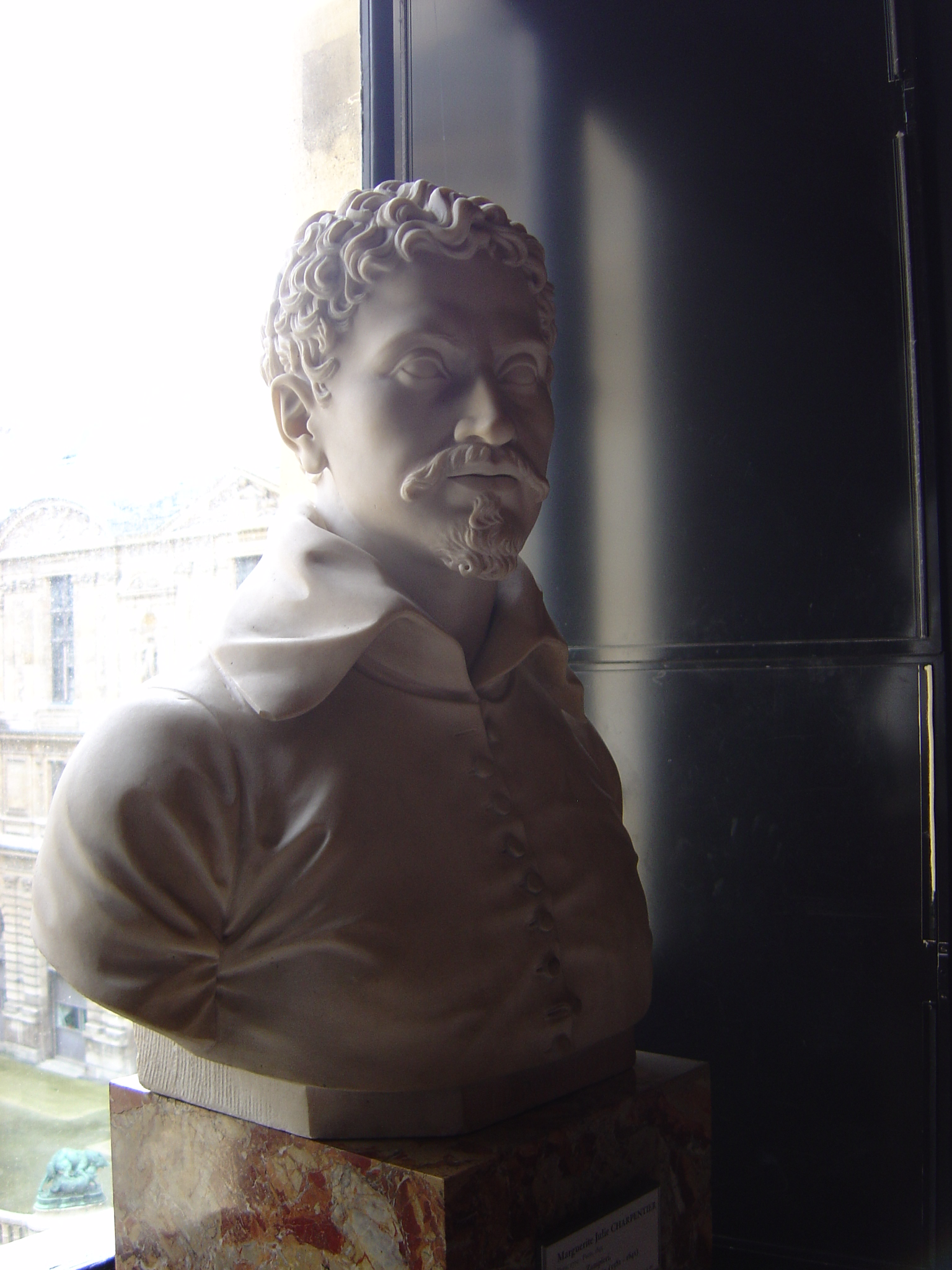
Domenichino by Julie Charpentier

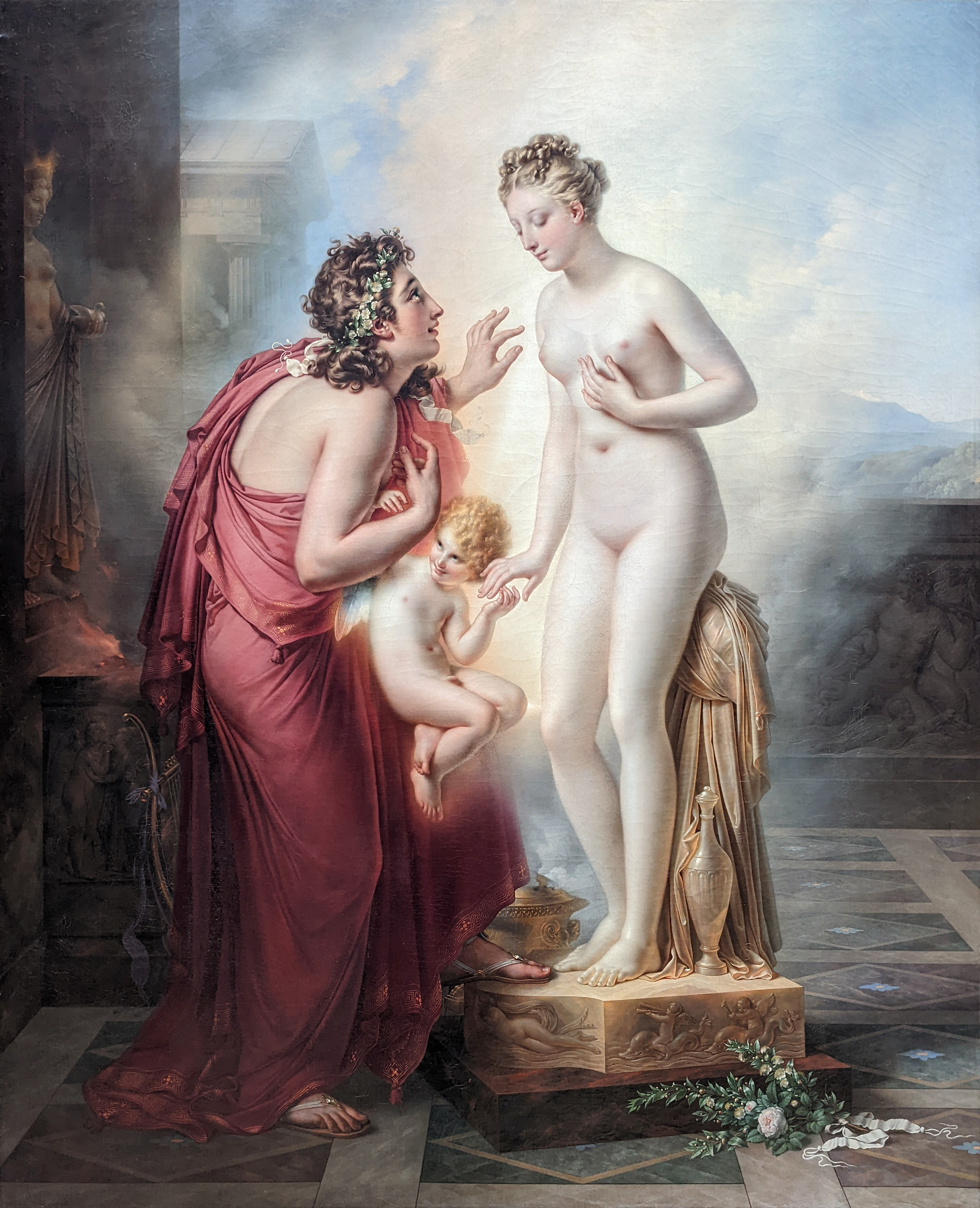
Pygmalion and Galatea by Girodet

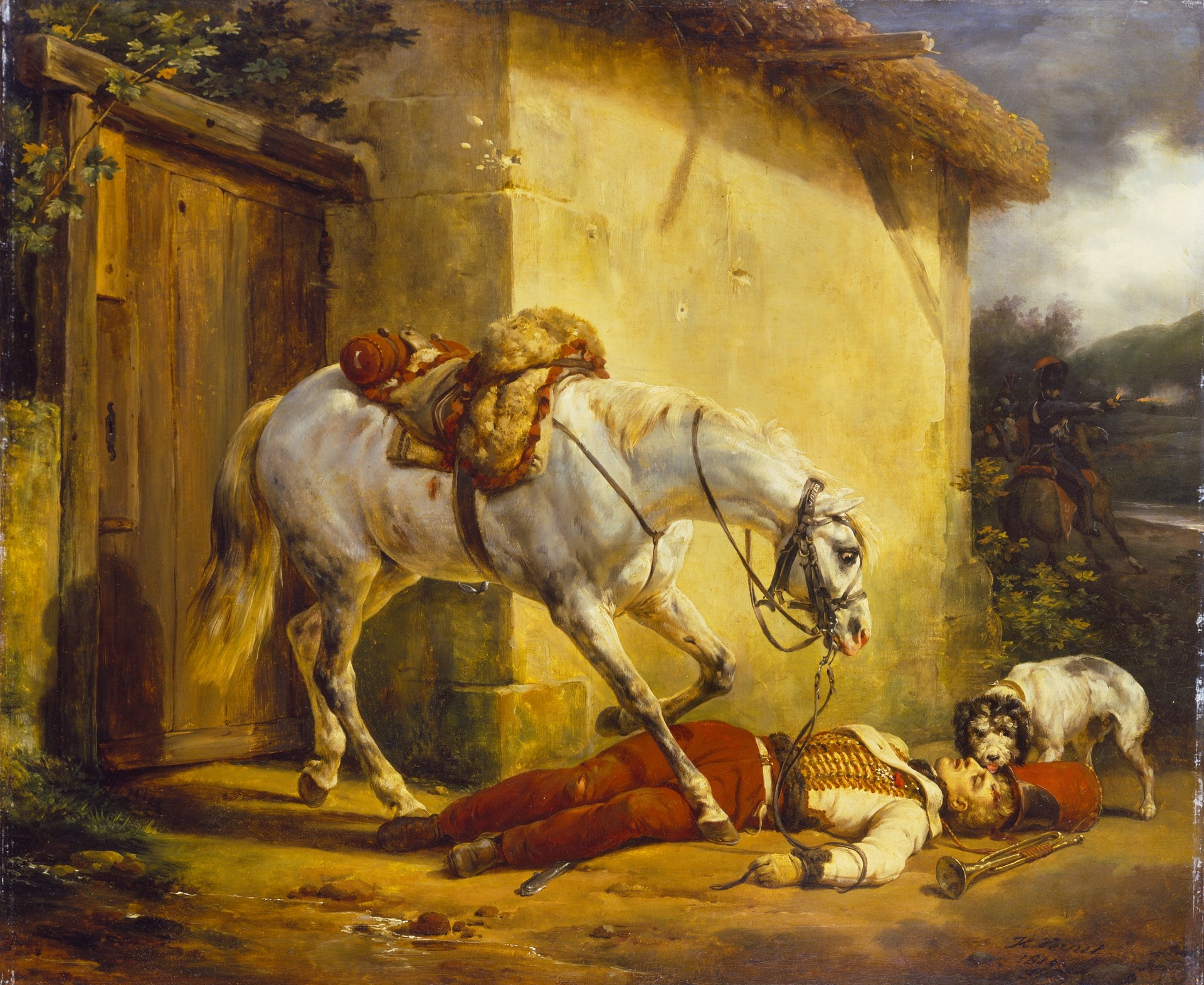
The Wounded Trumpeter by Horace Vernet

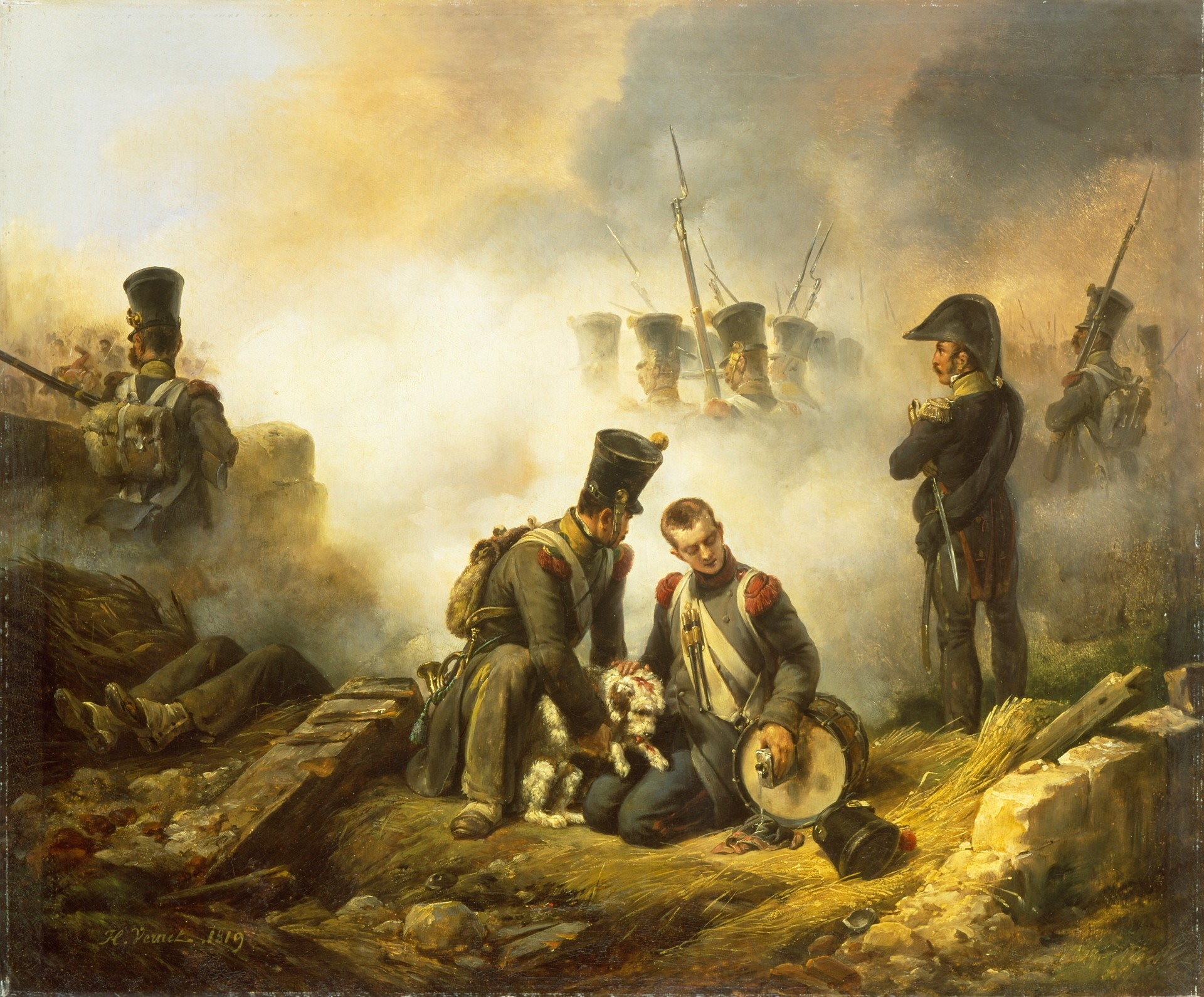
The Dog of the Regiment Wounded by Horace Vernet

Massacre of the Mamelukes by Horace Vernet

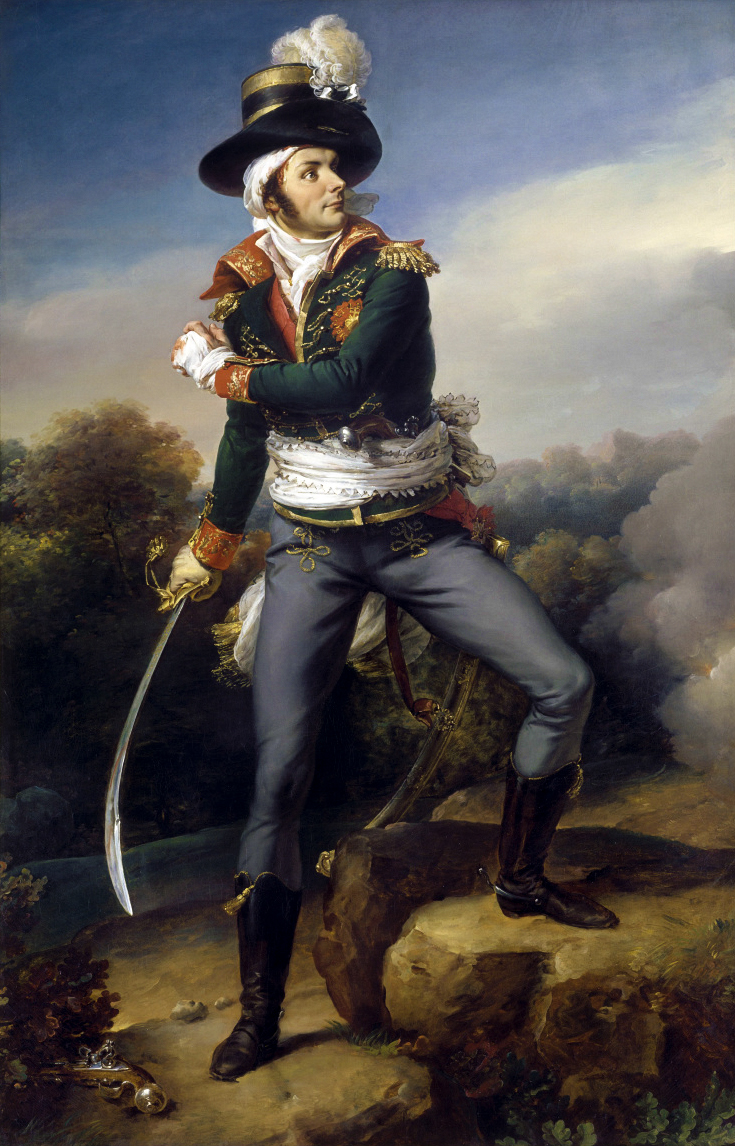
Portrait of François de Charette by Jean-Baptiste Paulin Guérin

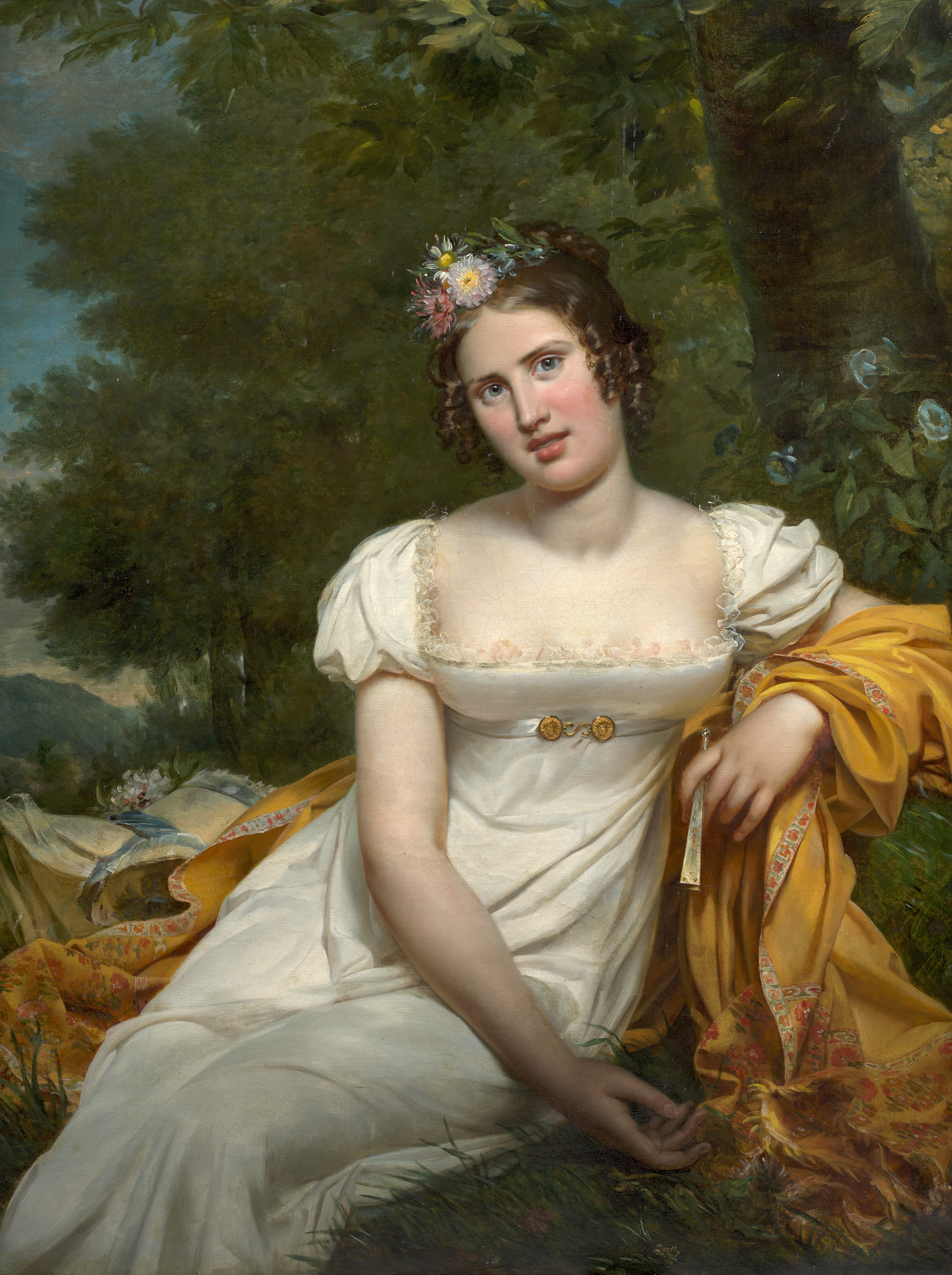
Alexandrine Jolly by Jean-Baptiste Paulin Guérin

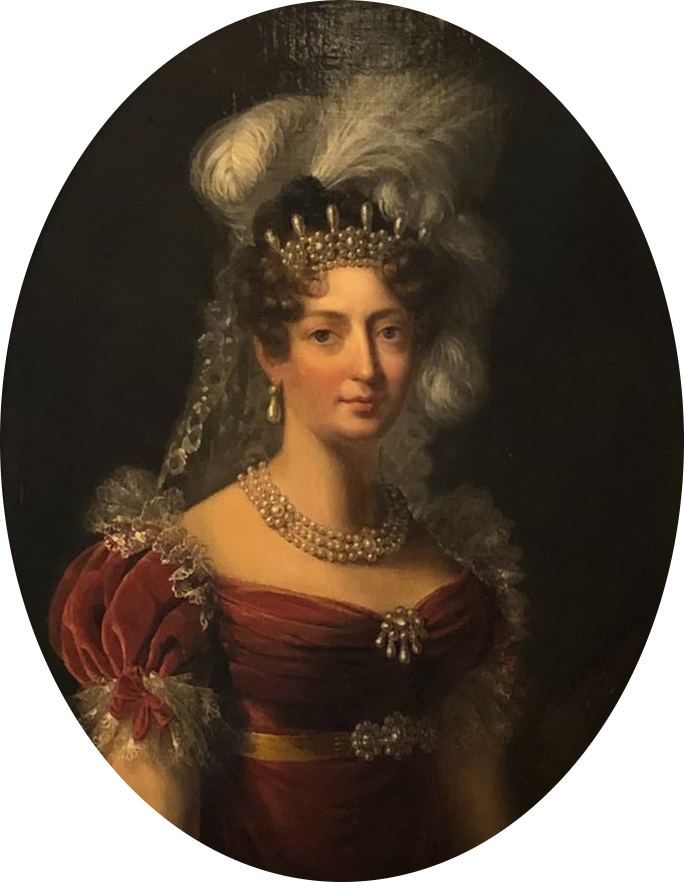
Portrait of the Duchess of Angoulême by Louise Bouteiller

Titus pardons the conspiring senators by François Joseph Heim

Titus and Vespasian Distribute Aid to the People by François Joseph Heim

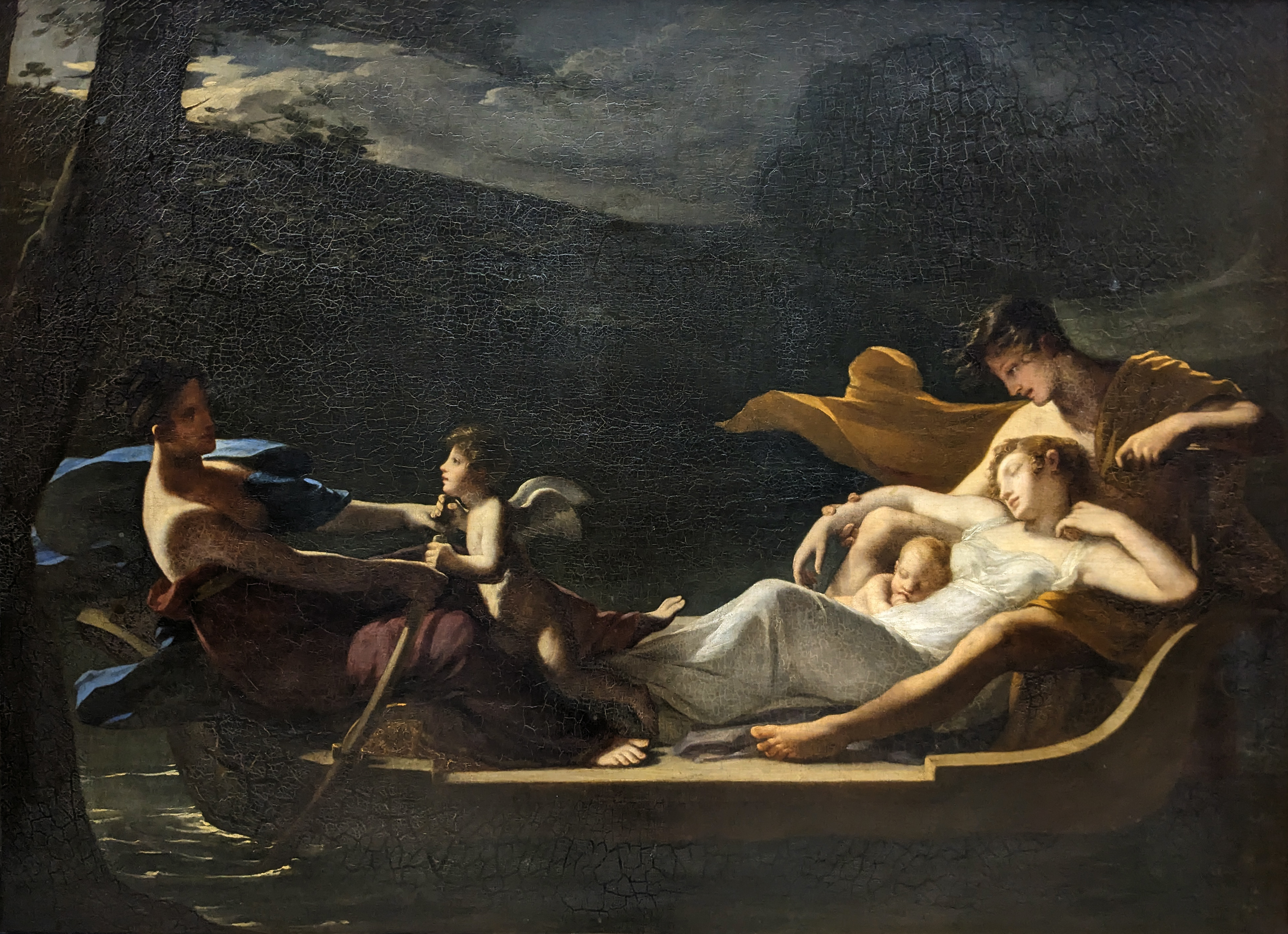
The Dream of Happiness by Constance Mayer and Pierre-Paul Prud'hon

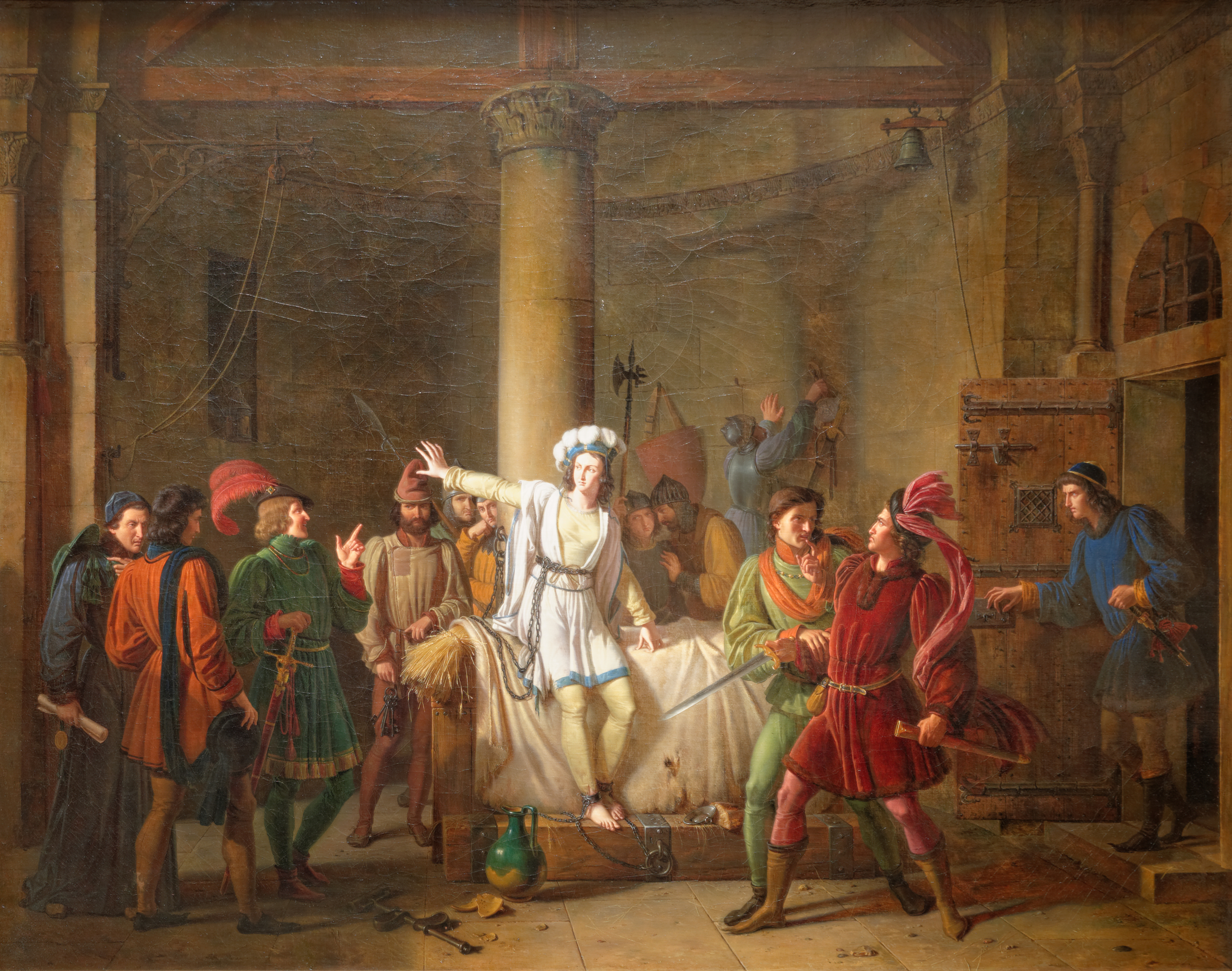
Joan of Arc Imprisoned in Rouen by Pierre Révoil

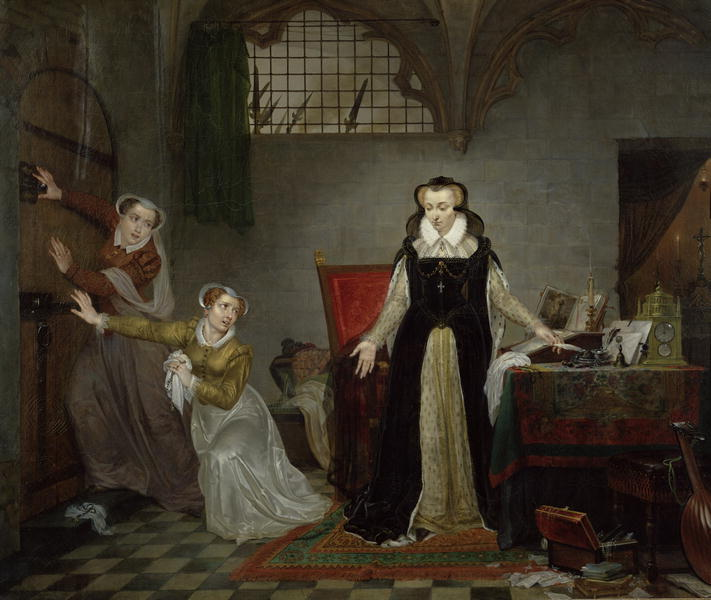
Mary, Queen of Scots in her Cell by Philippe-Jacques van Bree

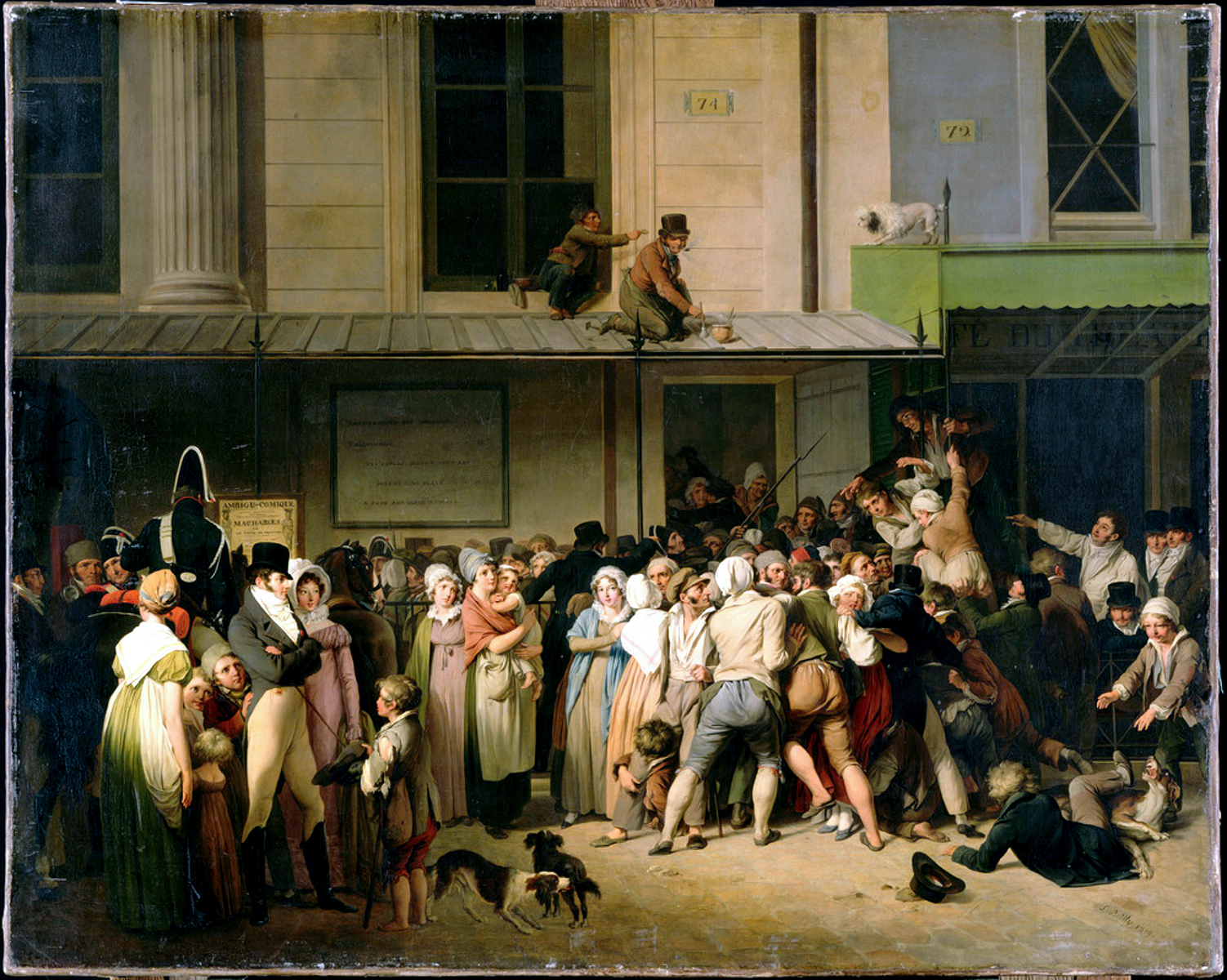
Entrance to the Ambigu-Comique Theatre by Louis-Léopold Boilly

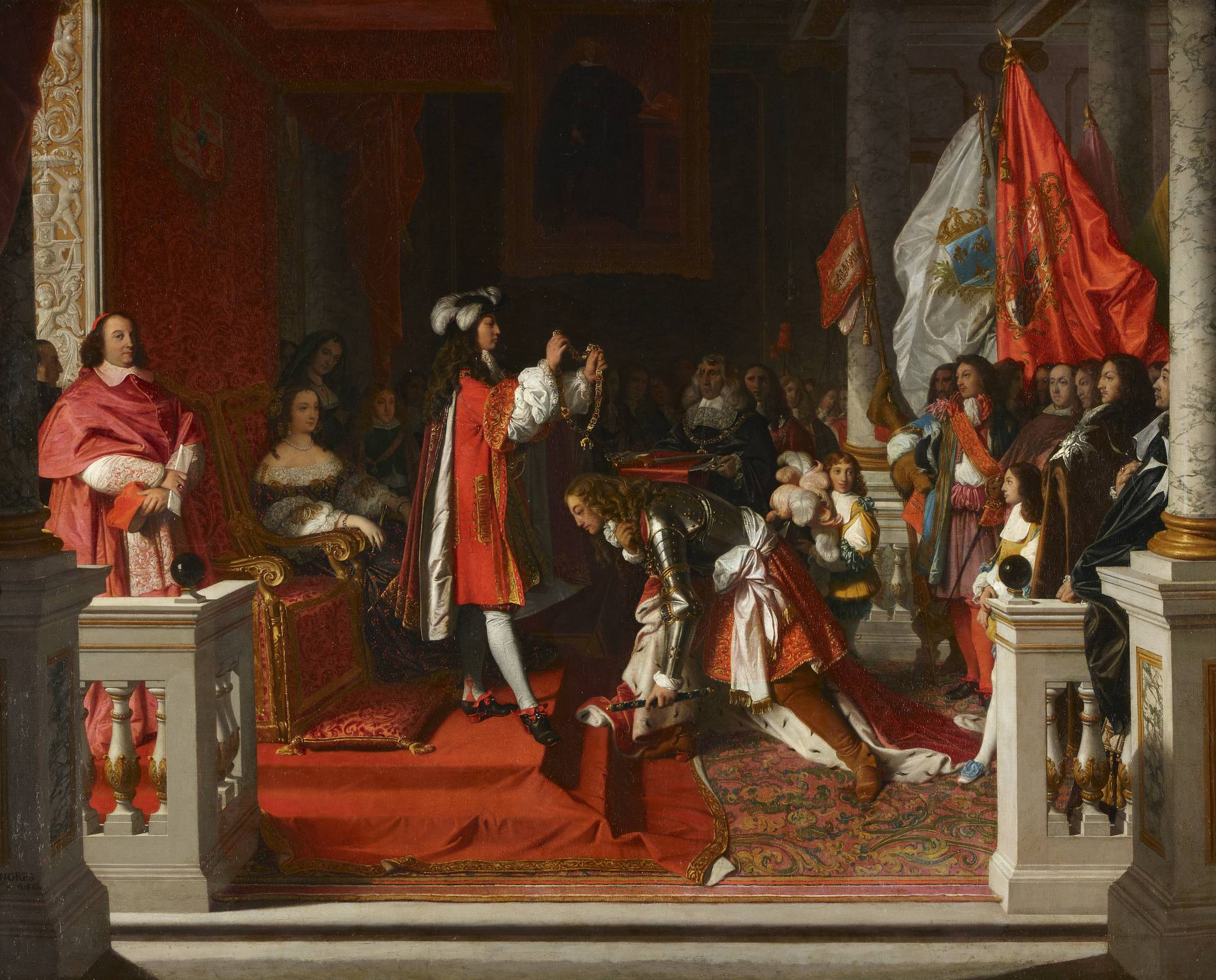
Philip V of Spain Investing Marshal Berwick with the Golden Fleece by Jean-Auguste-Dominique Ingres

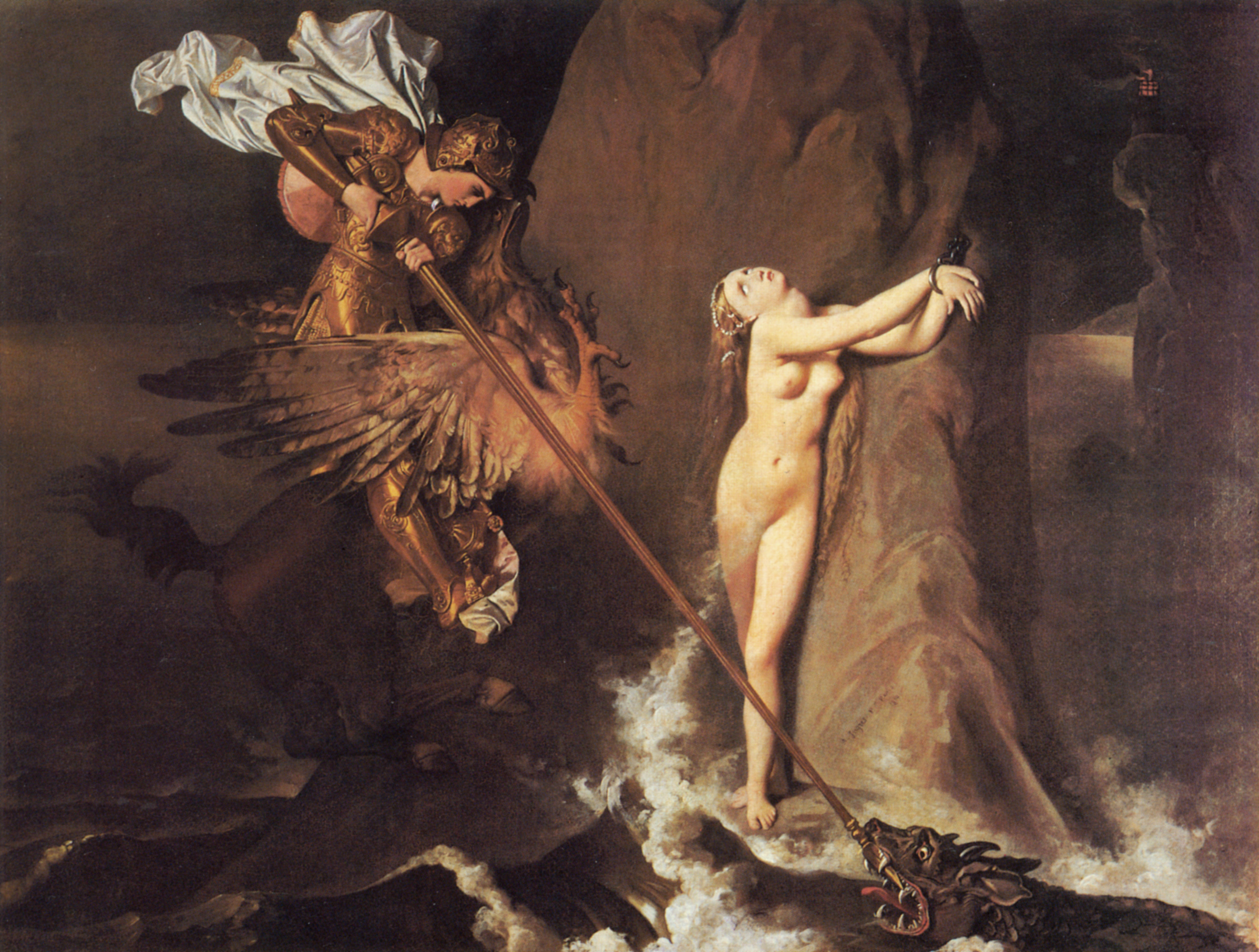
Roger Freeing Angelica by Jean-Auguste-Dominique Ingres

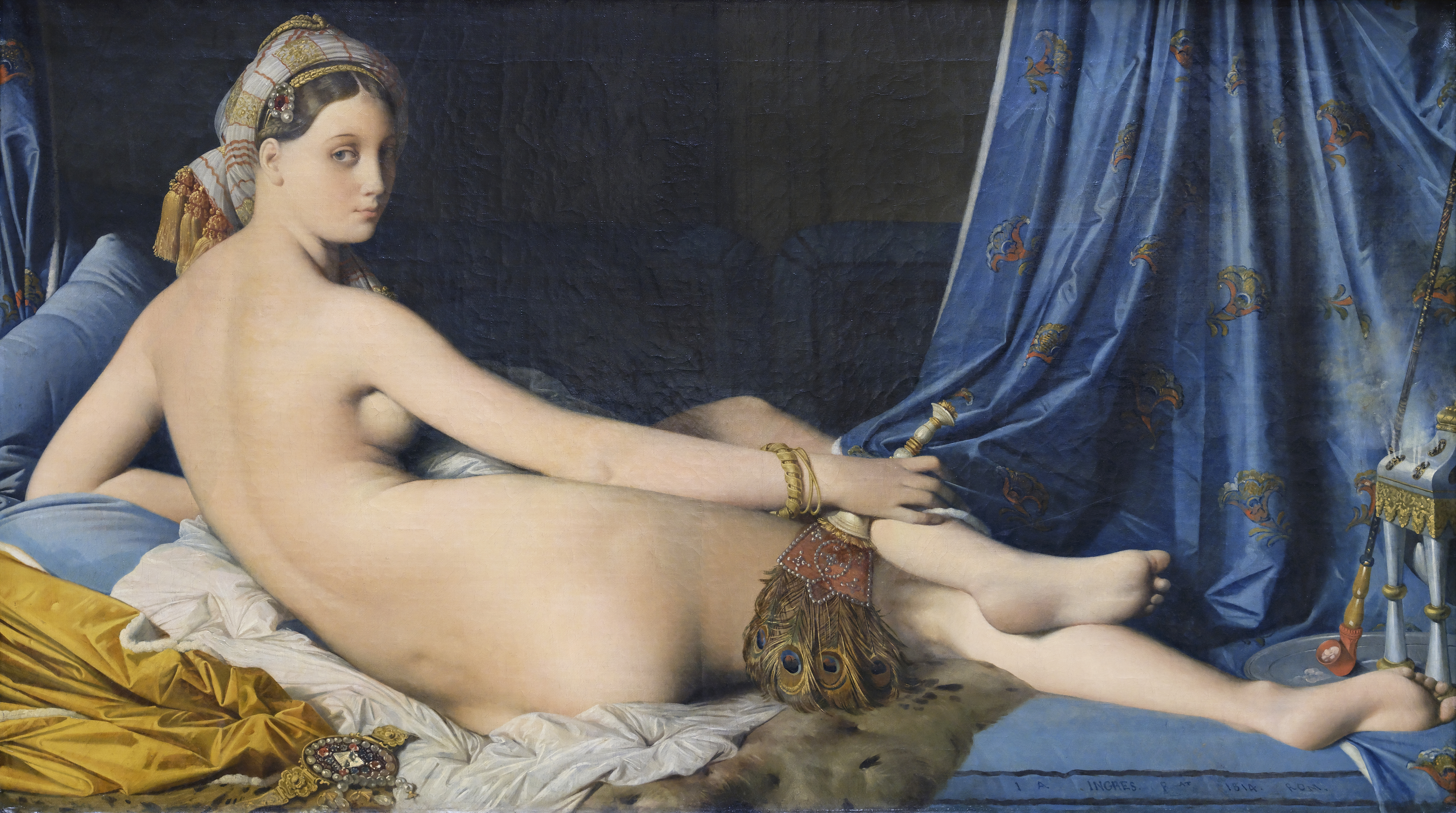
Grande Odalisque by Jean-Auguste-Dominique Ingres

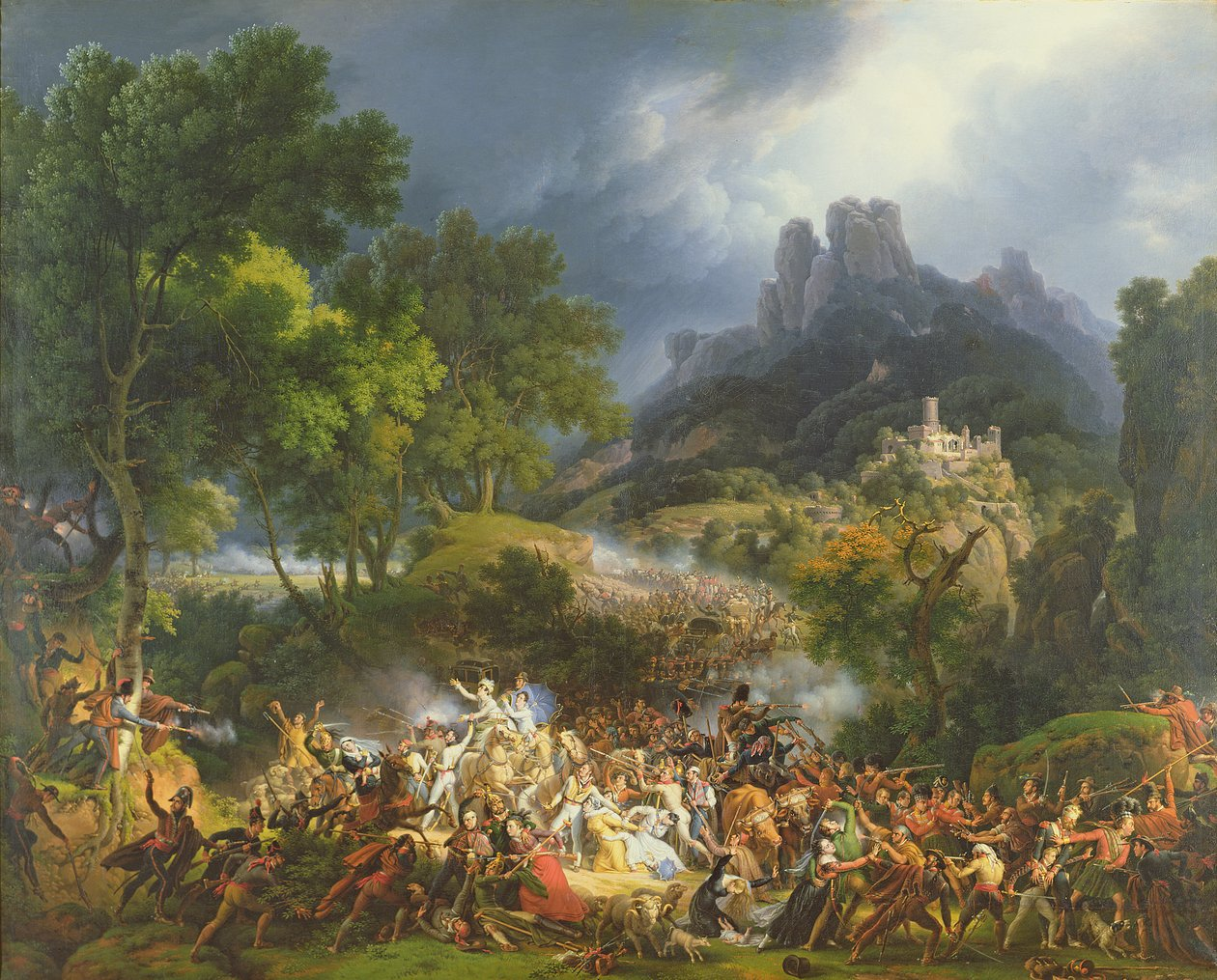
Attack on a large convoy at Salinas by Louis-François Lejeune

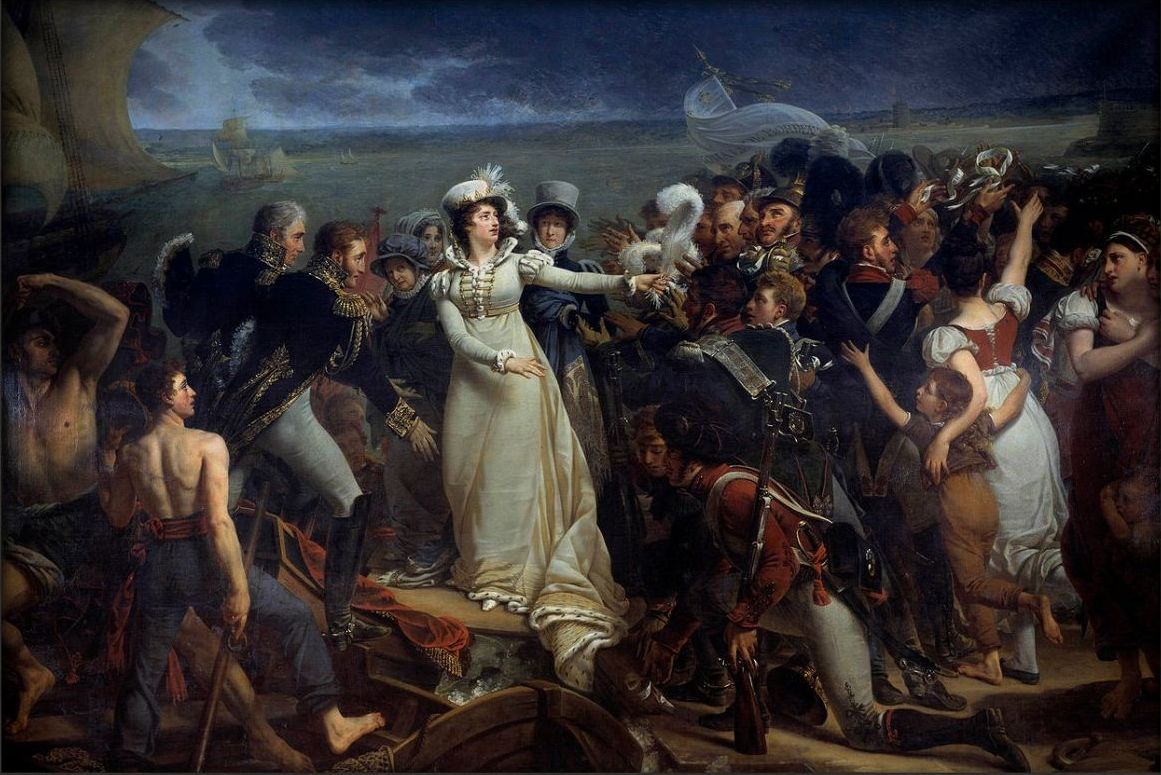
The Embarkation of the Duchess of Angoulême at Pauillac by Antoine-Jean Gros

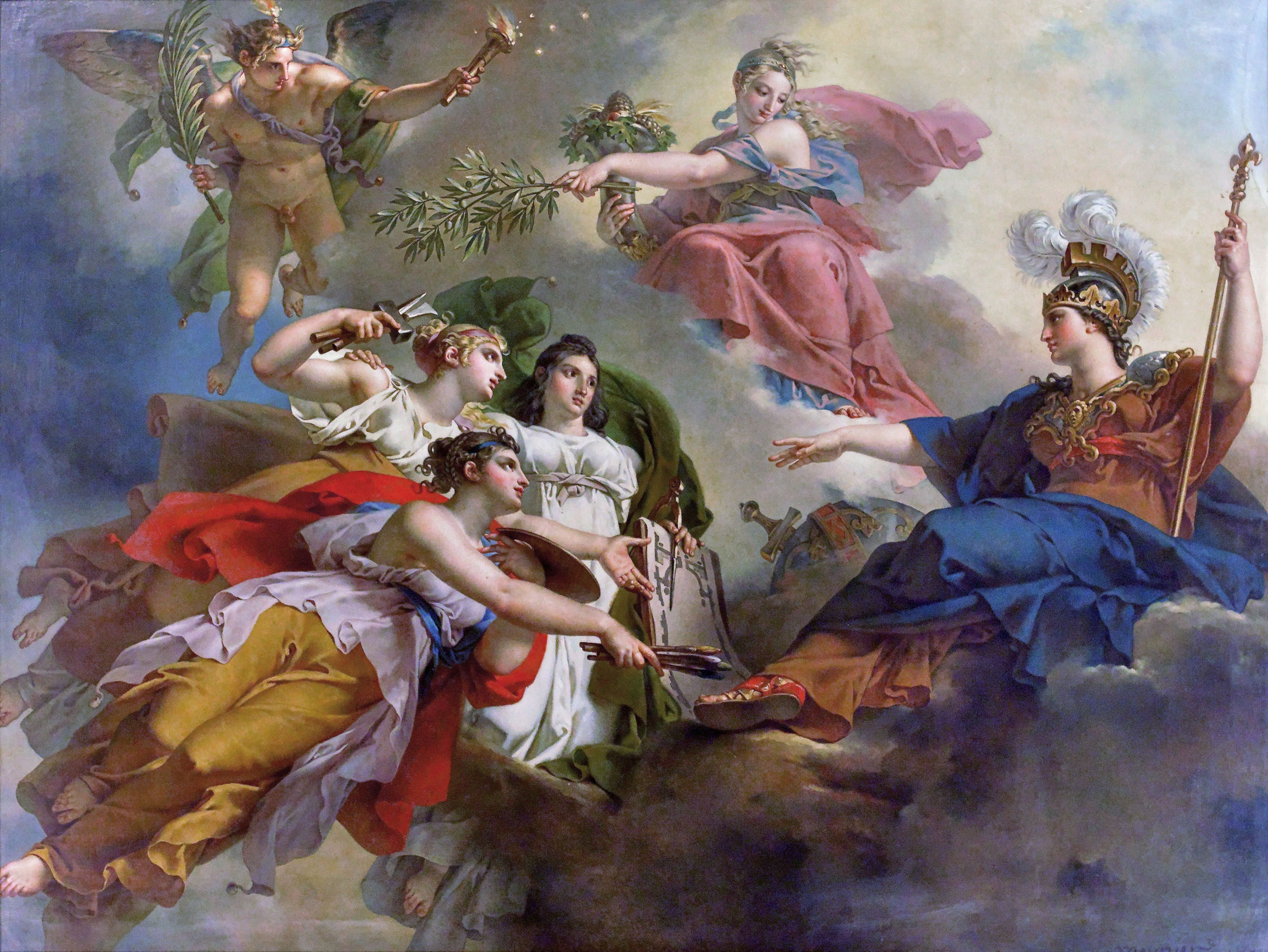
France in the Guise of Minerva by Charles Meynier

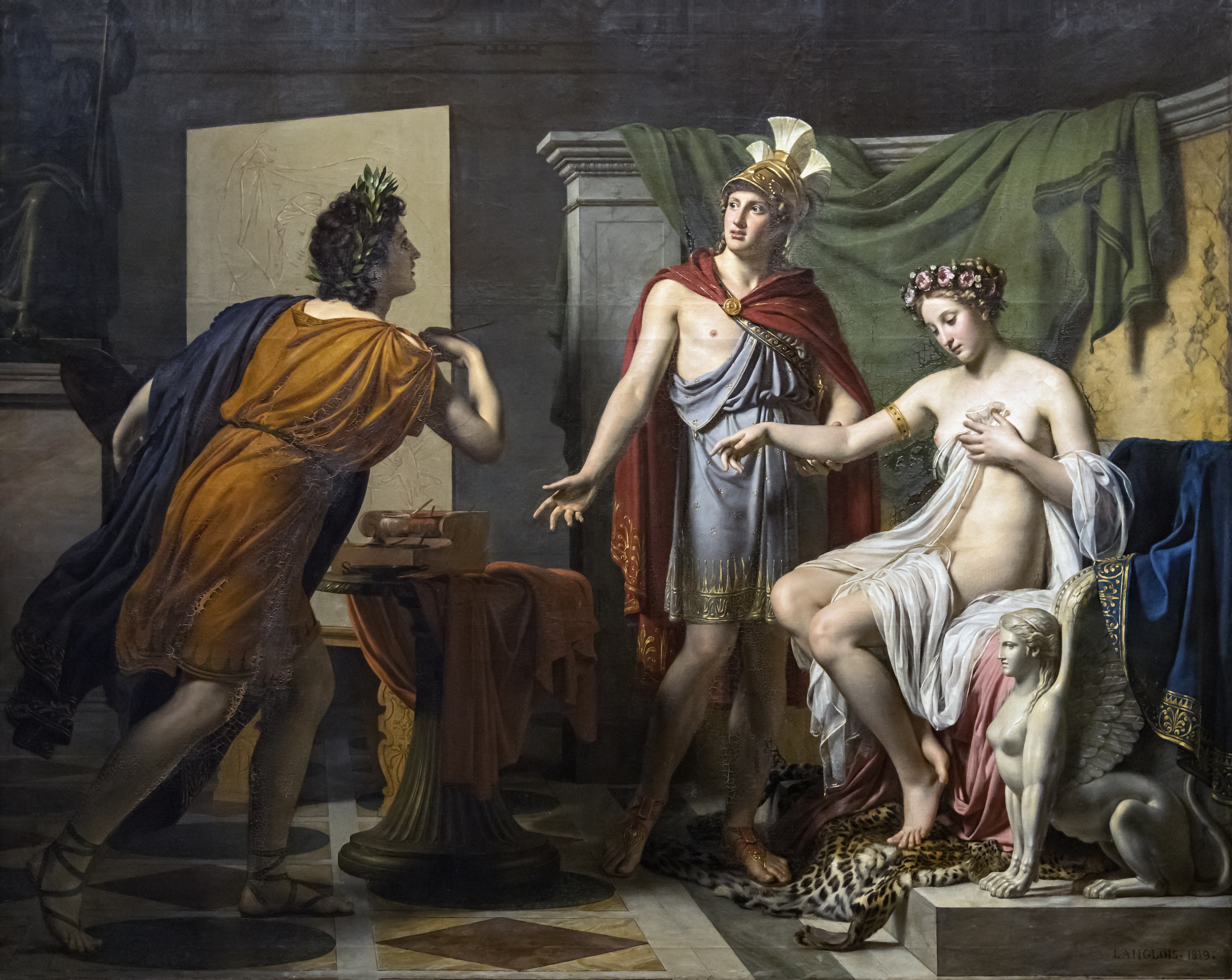
Generosity of Alexander by Jérôme-Martin Langlois

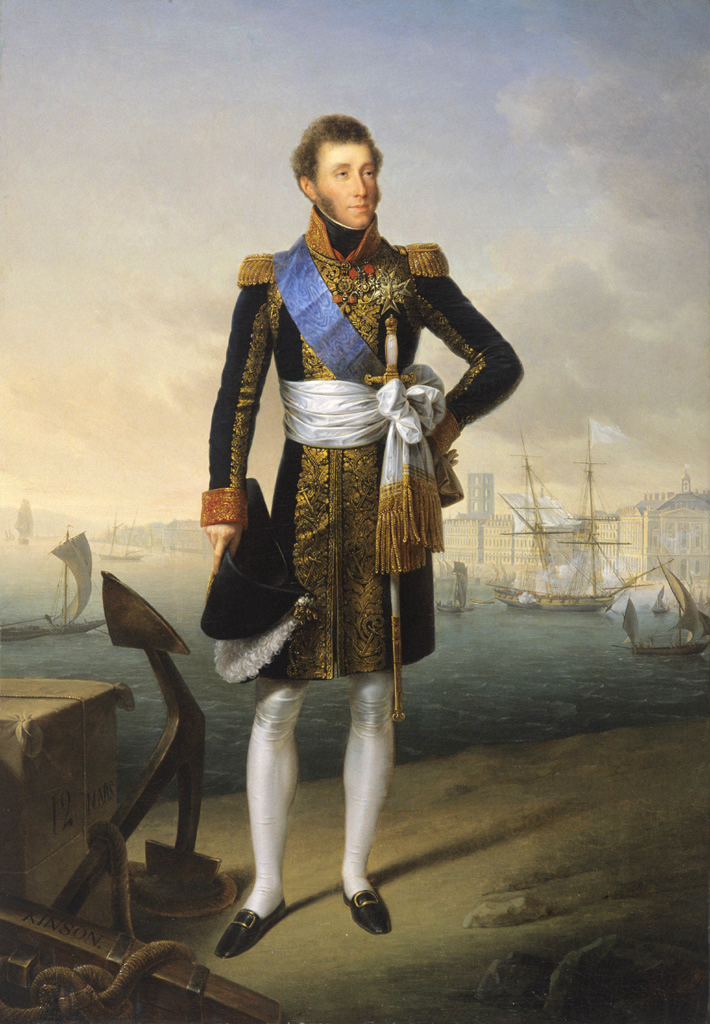
Portrait of the Duke of Angoulême by François Kinson

Portrait of the Marquis de Lafayette by Ary Scheffer

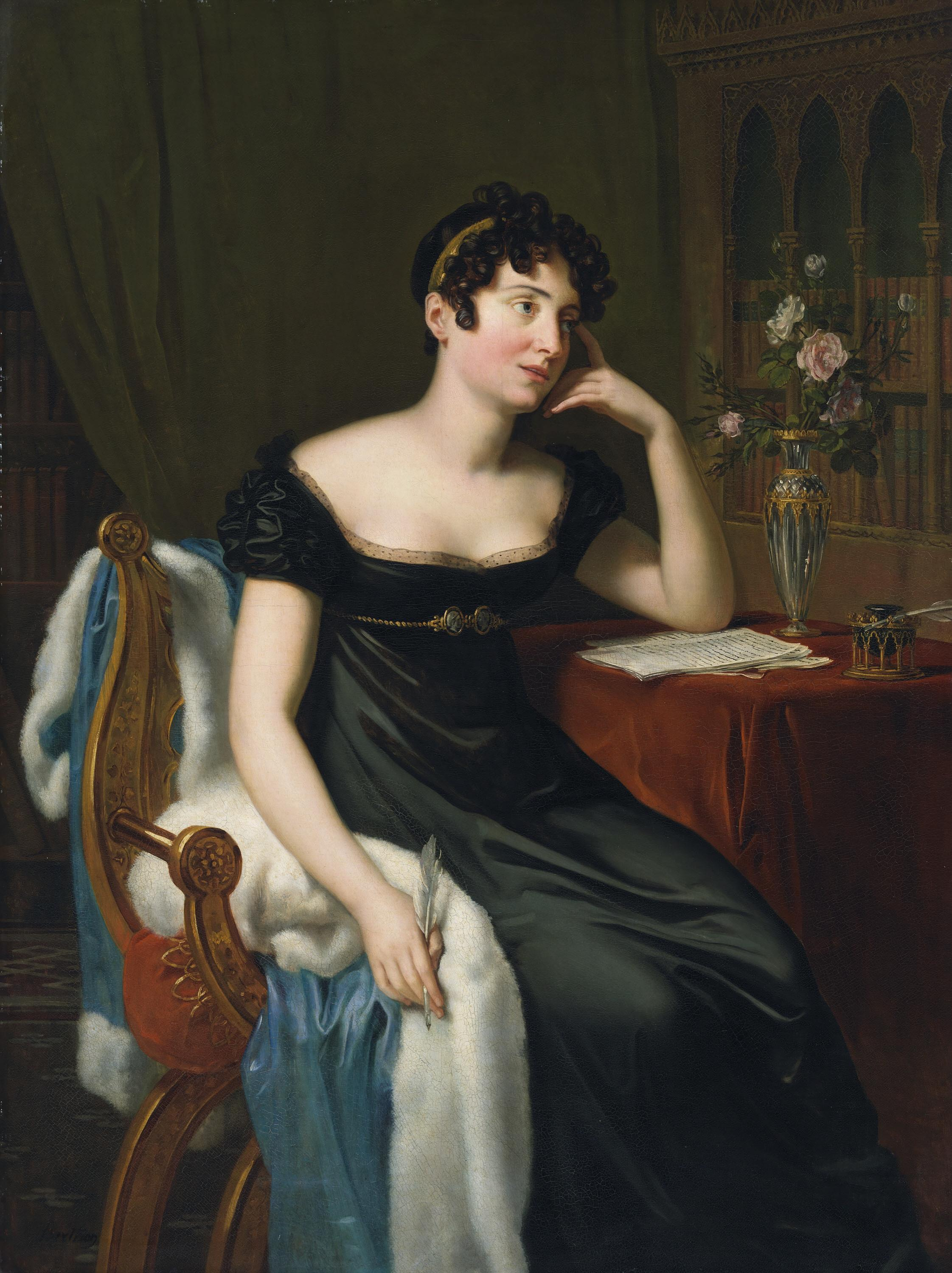
Portrait of Lady Morgan by René Théodore Berthon

== See also ==
- Category:Artworks exhibited at the Salon of 1819

== Bibliography ==
- Boime, Albert. Art in an Age of Counterrevolution, 1815–1848. University of Chicago Press, 2004.
- Harkett, Daniel & Hornstein, Katie (ed.) Horace Vernet and the Thresholds of Nineteenth-Century Visual Culture. Dartmouth College Press, 2017.
- Miles, Jonathan. Medusa: The Shipwreck, the Scandal, the Masterpiece. Random House, 2008.
- Noon, Patrick & Bann, Stephen. Constable to Delacroix: British Art and the French Romantics. Tate, 2003.
- Spitzer, Alan Barrie. The French Generation of 1820. Princeton University Press, 2014.
- Tinterow, Gary & Conisbee, Philip (ed.) Portraits by Ingres: Image of an Epoch. Metropolitan Museum of Art, 1999.
