= The Dog of the Regiment Wounded =

Painting by Horace Vernet

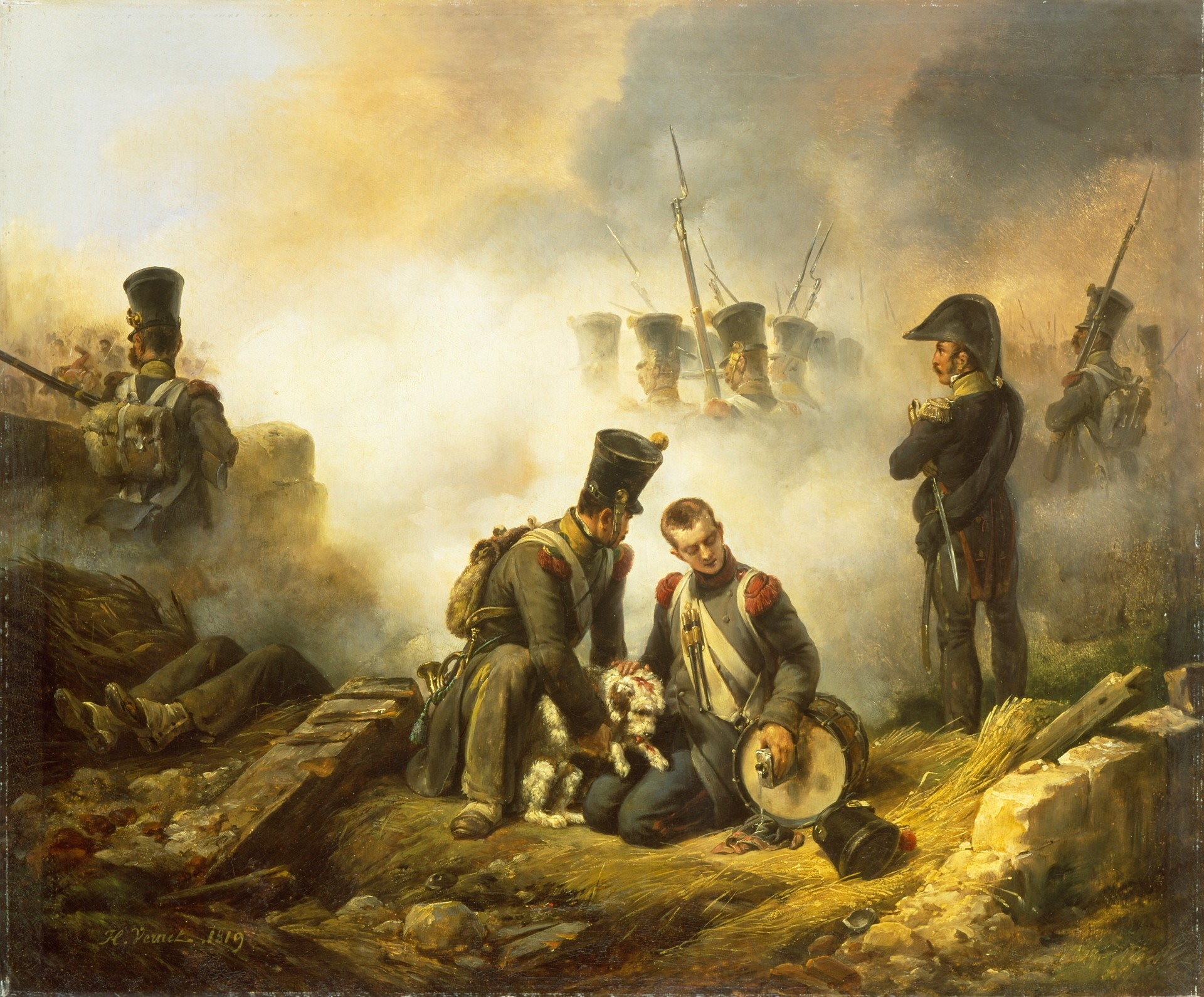
- Artist: Horace Vernet
- Year: 1819
- Type: Oil on canvas, history painting
- Dimensions: 53.1 cm × 64.3 cm (20.9 in × 25.3 in)
- Location: Wallace Collection, London

The Dog of the Regiment Wounded is an 1819 oil painting by the French artist Horace Vernet. It shows a battle scene from the Napoleonic Wars in which a dog, a regimental mascot, has been wounded in the fighting and is being treated by two French bandsman, a bugler of the voltigeurs and a drummer of the grenadiers.

The work was produced during the Restoration era. It was exhibited at the Salon of 1819 in Paris. It possibly avoided restrictions on portraying or glorifying the fallen Napoleonic regime as both this and its pendant painting The Wounded Trumpeter had been purchased by the Duke of Berry, the nephew of Louis XVIII, prior to the Salon.

It was one of the artist's most popular works. Today it is in the Wallace Collection in London, having been acquired from the widowed Duchess of Berry in 1865.

== Bibliography ==
- Duffy, Stephen. The Wallace Collection. Scala, 2005.
- Ingamells, John. The Wallace Collection: French Nineteenth Century. Trustees of the Wallace Collection, 1985.
- Harkett, Daniel & Hornstein, Katie (ed.) Horace Vernet and the Thresholds of Nineteenth-Century Visual Culture. Dartmouth College Press, 2017.
