= The Wounded Trumpeter =

Painting by Horace Vernet

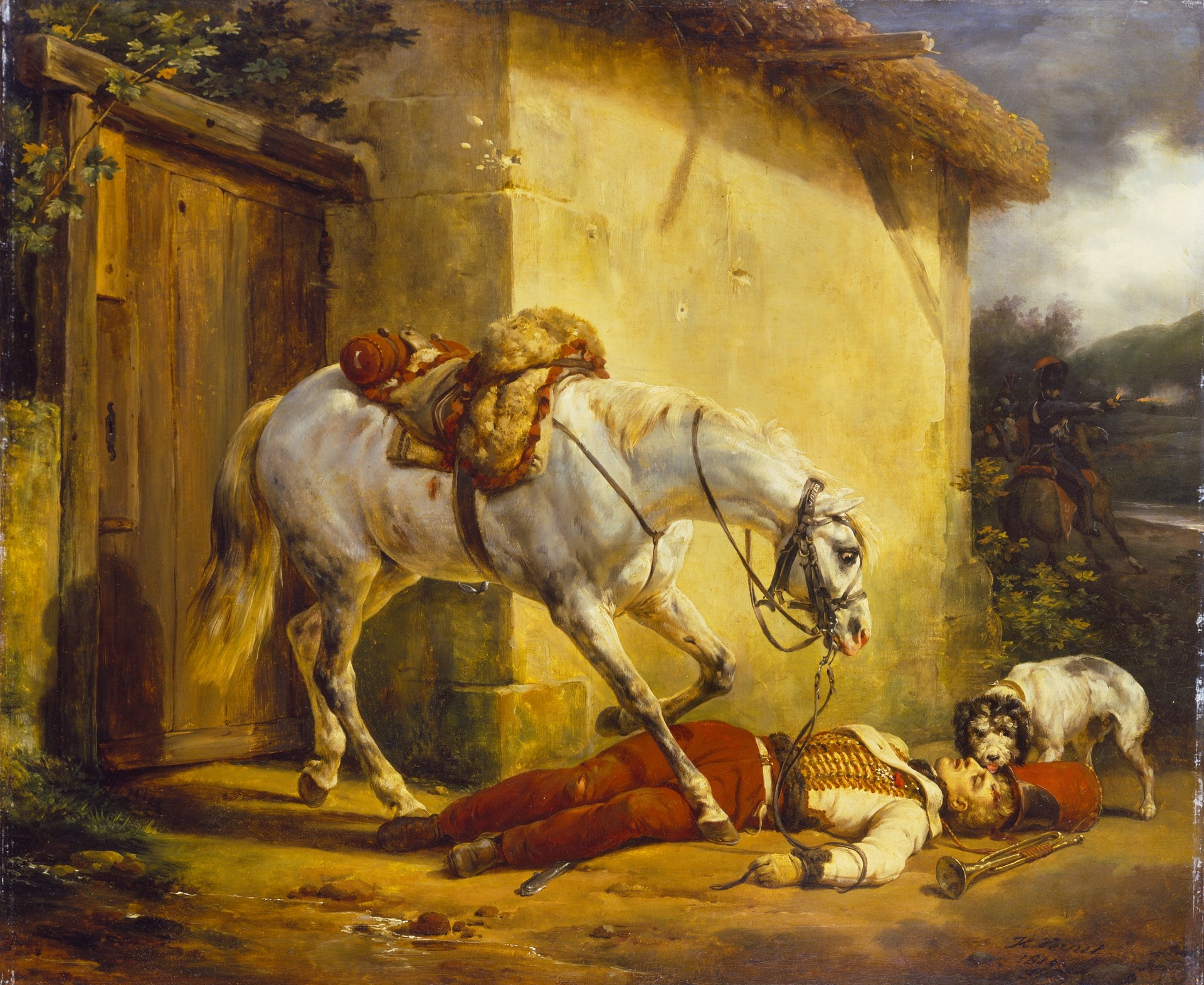
- Artist: Horace Vernet
- Year: 1819
- Type: Oil on canvas, genre painting
- Dimensions: 53.1 cm × 64.3 cm (20.9 in × 25.3 in)
- Location: Wallace Collection, London

The Wounded Trumpeter is an 1819 oil painting by the French artist Horace Vernet. It depicts a scene from the Napoleonic Wars. A trumpeter of the First Hussar Regiment lays wounded while both his horse and a dog show concern for the wounded soldier.

It was exhibited at the Salon of 1819 at the Louvre in Paris. Both this work and its pendant painting The Dog of the Regiment Wounded had been purchased by the Duke of Berry, the nephew of Louis XVIII, prior to the Salon. Today it is in the Wallace Collection in London, having been acquired from the Duchess of Berry by the Marquess of Hertford in 1865.

== Bibliography ==
- Duffy, Stephen. The Wallace Collection. Scala, 2005.
- Ingamells, John. The Wallace Collection: French Nineteenth Century. Trustees of the Wallace Collection, 1985.
- Harkett, Daniel & Hornstein, Katie (ed.) Horace Vernet and the Thresholds of Nineteenth-Century Visual Culture. Dartmouth College Press, 2017.
