= The Massacre of the Mamelukes =

Painting by Horace Vernet

Massacre of the Mamelukes
- Artist: Horace Vernet
- Year: 1819
- Type: Oil on canvas, history painting
- Dimensions: 386 cm × 514 cm (152 in × 202 in)
- Location: Musée de Picardie, Amiens

The Massacre of the Mamelukes (French: Le Massacre des Mamelouks) is an 1819 history painting by the French artist Horace Vernet.

== History and description ==
It depicts the massacre of the Mamelukes at the Citadel of Cairo in 1811, portraying a concluding moment in the first Egyptian Khedive Muhammad Ali's rise to power. It was an early Orientalist painting by Vernet, then known primarily for his scenes of the Napoleonic era. He would later produce a number of other works of North Africa, primarily featuring the French conquest of Algeria from 1830. Having ordered the massacre, Muhammad Ali sits calmly, smoking his narguile as he watches the violence unfold. This may have been an indirect reference to the White Terror that followed the Second Bourbon Restoration in France following the Battle of Waterloo.

It was exhibited at the Salon of 1819 in Paris. Today it is in the collection of the Musée de Picardie in Amiens. Vernet produced several other versions of the scene. A tapestry was produced based on the painting and featured at the Great Exhibition at the Crystal Palace in 1851.

== Bibliography ==
- Boime, Albert. Art in an Age of Counterrevolution, 1815-1848. University of Chicago Press, 2004.
- Grigsby, Darcy Grimaldo. Extremities: Painting Empire in Post-revolutionary France. Yale University Press, 2002.
- Harkett, Daniel & Hornstein, Katie (ed.) Horace Vernet and the Thresholds of Nineteenth-Century Visual Culture. Dartmouth College Press, 2017.
- Murray, Christopher John. Encyclopedia of the Romantic Era, 1760-1850, Volume 2. Taylor & Francis, 2004.
- Ruutz-Rees, Janet Emily. Horace Vernet. Scribner and Welford, 1880.
