= Pygmalion and Galatea (Girodet) =

Painting by Anne-Louis Girodet

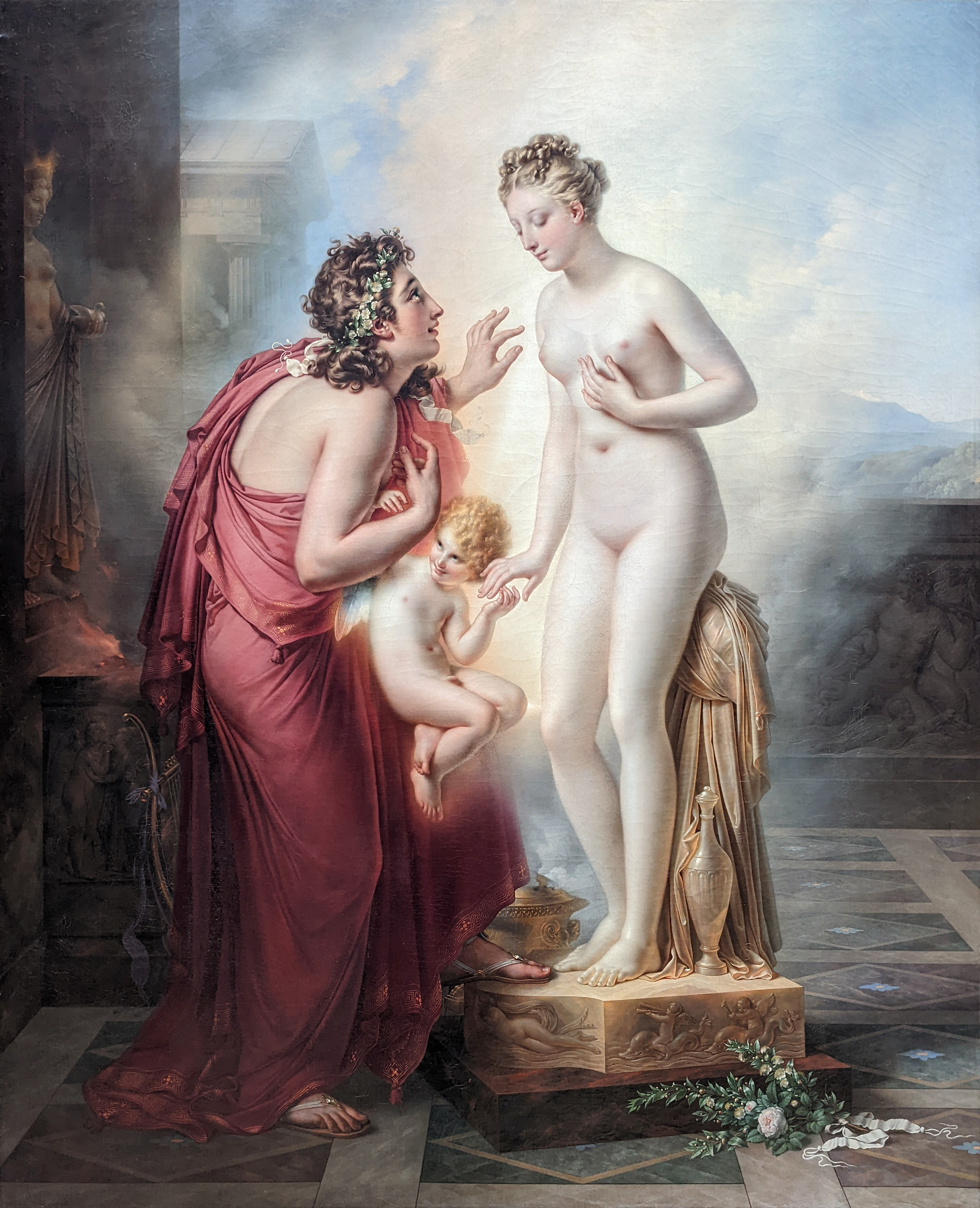
- Artist: Anne-Louis Girodet de Roussy-Trioson
- Year: 1813-1819
- Medium: Oil on canvas
- Dimensions: 253 cm × 202 cm (100 in × 80 in)
- Location: Louvre, Paris

Pygmalion and Galatea is an oil-on-canvas painting by the French painter Anne-Louis Girodet. It represents the myth of Pygmalion and Galatea as told by Ovid in the Metamorphoses. The figures Pygmalion and Galatea are shown with Cupid, the god of desire. Girodet began the work in 1813, but it took him six years to complete.

Stylistically, the work has elements of both Neoclassicism and Romanticism. It is now in the collection of the Louvre.

== Background ==
Pygmalion and Galatea dates from the end of Girodet's career, when he was already a well known figure.

The timeline of his efforts in creating Pygmalion and Galatea is documented in a series of letters dating from 1812 to 1819. The long period of development stemmed from a combination of factors, including trouble in finding models, the death of Girodet's legal guardian Trioson, and Girodet falling ill in 1817.

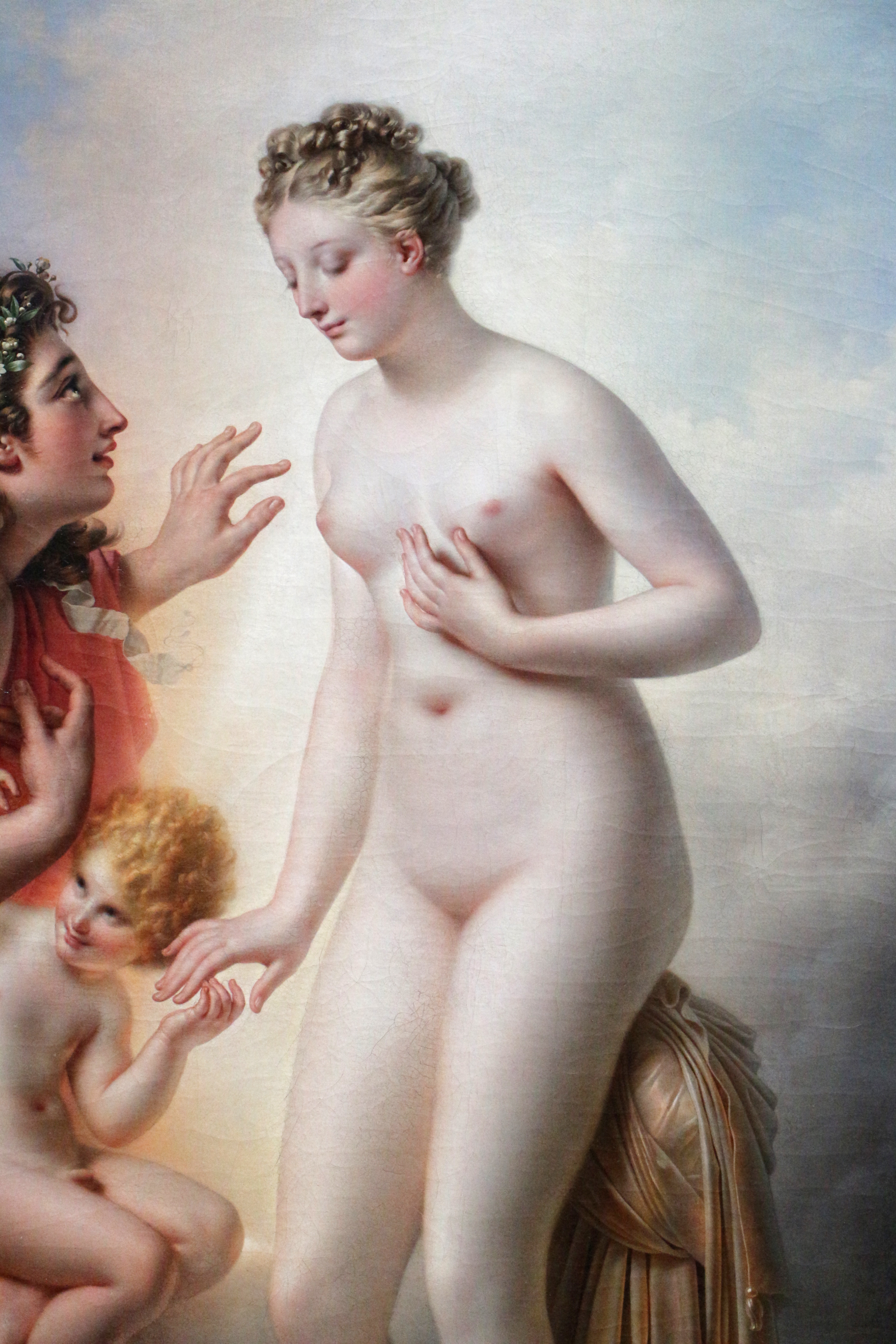
Galatea in Pygmalion and Galatea

== Analysis ==
The work is set in Pygmalion's house. The painting depicts the moment where Galatea first comes to life, turning from inanimate matter into flesh. The light and smoke from the incense burning near the feet of the two figures create an atmosphere of mystery that accentuates the magic of Galatea's creation.

=== Galatea ===
Girodet described Galatea as a "very blonde woman completely in the light." Galatea is fully nude. Her face and pink cheeks resemble those of a newborn baby, reinforcing the idea that the scene represents the moment of her birth. Girodet devoted significant attention to the depiction of flesh in his paintings, and this concern for skin contributed to the difficulties that he faced in selecting models.

=== Pygmalion ===
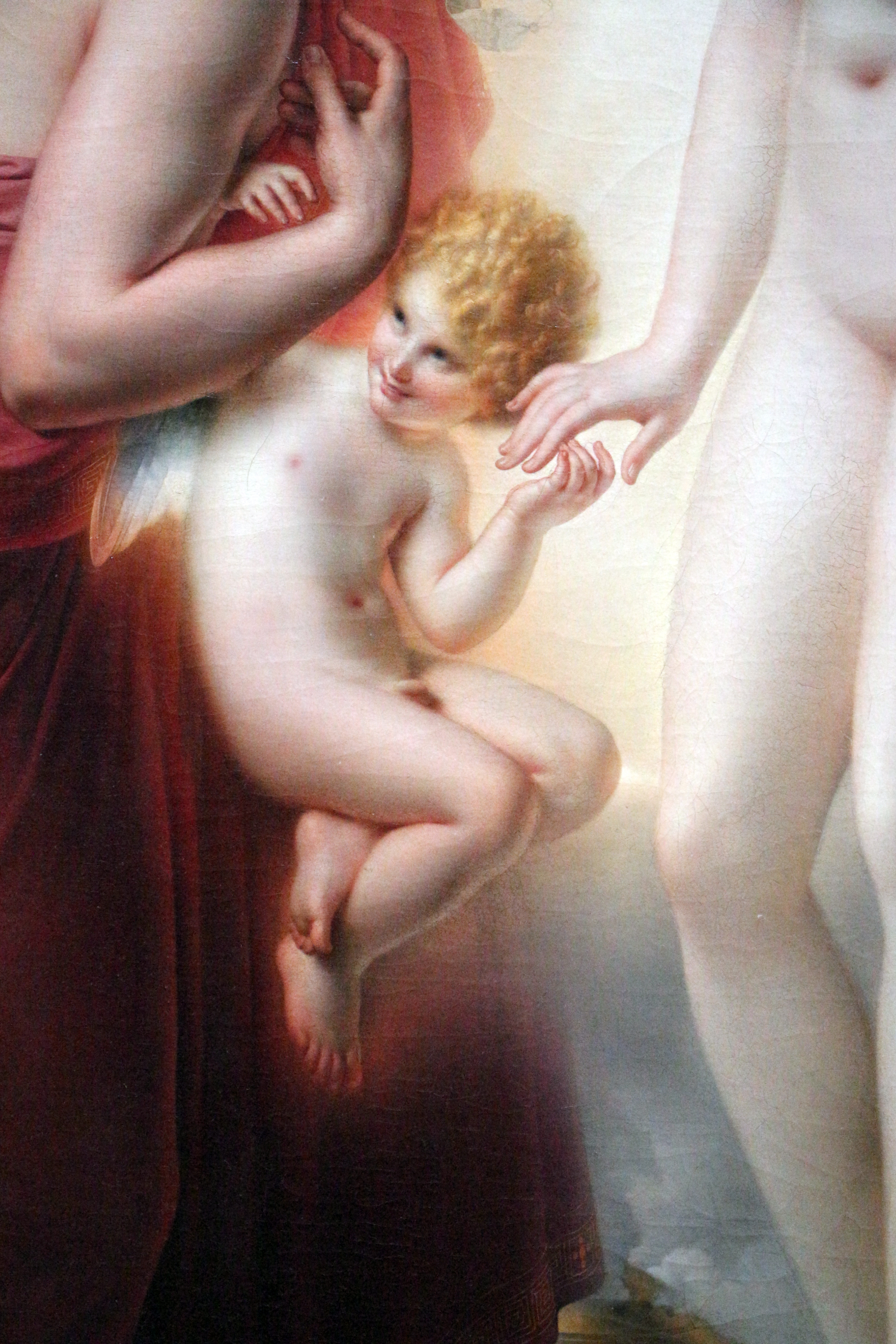
Cupid in Pygmalion and Galatea

Pygmalion is shown in a red robe. On top of his head sits a crown of dog roses tied with a white ribbon. On the face of Pygmalion, Girodet captures the admiration yet disbelief in seeing his sculpture come to life. The facial expression is also present in Girodet's depiction of Orestes in The Meeting of Hermione and Orestes.

=== Cupid (Eros) ===
Cupid, or Eros, connects the two figures. Placed deliberately in the center of the painting with curly hair, Cupid uses his arms to bring together Pygmalion and his creation. Cupid has a mischievous expression, in keeping with his traditional representation. He resembles Zephyr in Girodet's previous work The Sleep of Endymion.

== Commission ==
The painting was commissioned by the Italian patron Giovanni Battista Sommariva, who wanted a work paying homage to the Italian sculptor Antonio Canova (1757–1822). Sommariva fled to France after the invasion of Milan by Austrian troops. He then became virtual dictator of Milan when he later returned to Italy, between the years 1800 to 1802.

Sommariva began to live in Paris in the year 1806 after Napoleon stripped him of his title and introduced a new ruler, Conte Francesco Melzi e' Eril. It was this event that solidified his role in art and led him to commission of various paintings and sculptures. He focused most of his attention on works in the Neoclassical style, and also had a great love for works depicting mythological figures. Sommariva's other commissions included Cupid and Psyche by Jacques- Louis David.

The painting of Pygmalion and Galatea was exhibited for the first time at the Salon of 1819.

== Influences ==
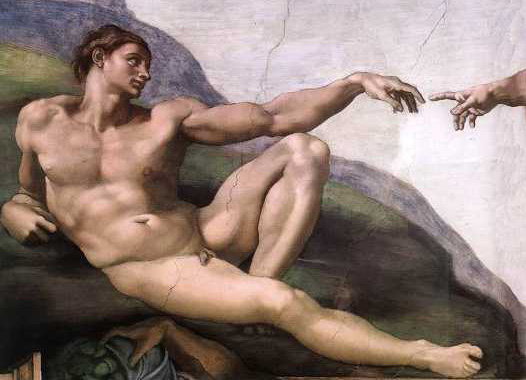
Detail of Adam from the Creation of Adam by Michelangelo

While in Rome, Girodet took inspiration from Renaissance art. The biggest influence came from Michelangelo, particularly his Creation of Adam, which shaped Girodet's approach to the human form. This is evident when looking at the musculature and detailing in both Girodet's pieces and the Creation of Adam.
