= Alexandre de La Motte-Baracé =

La Motte-Baracé Coat-of-Arms

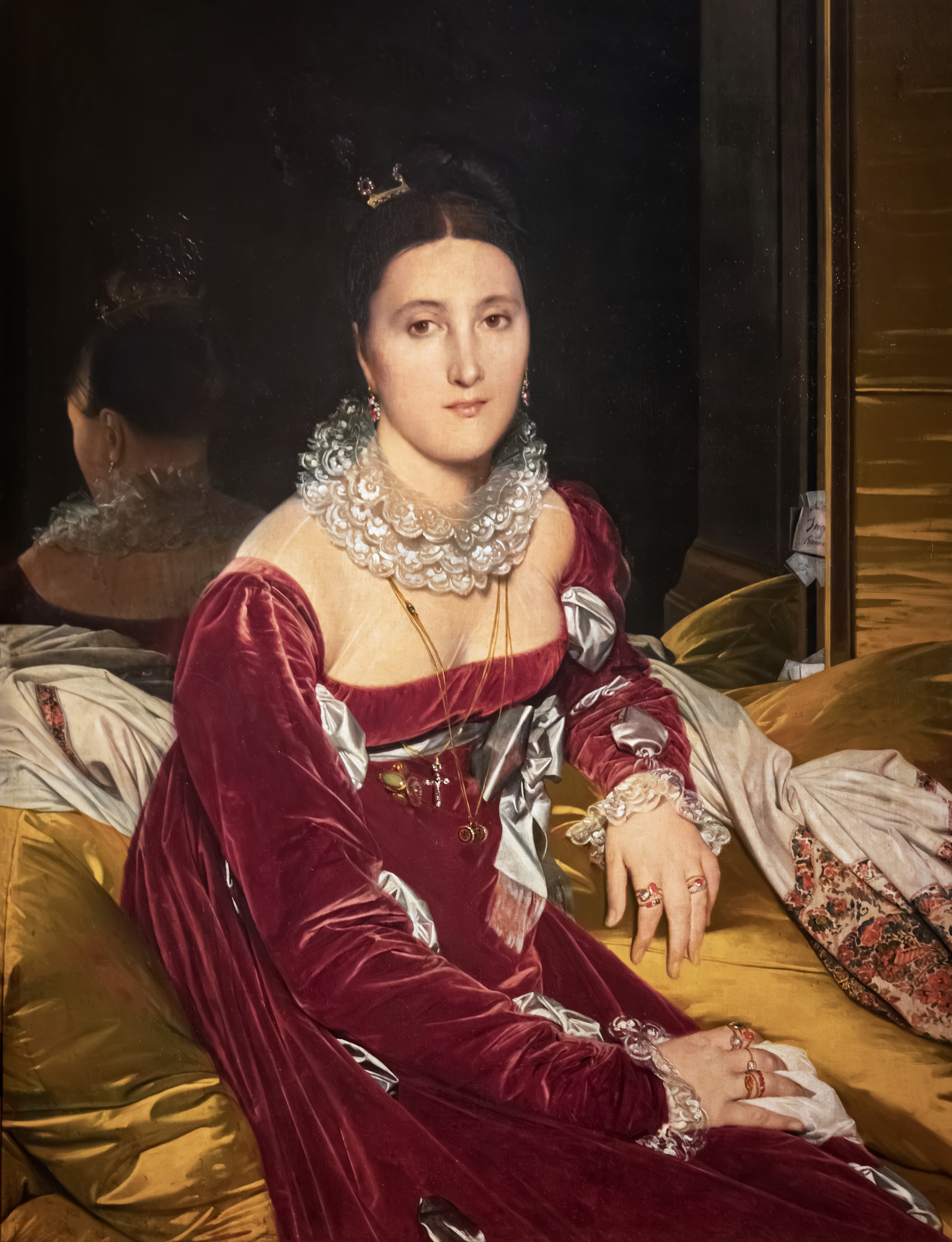
Portrait of his future wife, Marie, by Ingres (1814)

Alexandre de La Motte-Baracé, Vicomte de Senonnes (3 July 1781 in Senonnes – 21 March 1840 in Paris) was a French military officer, writer, and artist.

== Biography ==
He was the son of François-Pierre-Louis de La Motte-Baracé, Marquis de Senonnes, and Suzanne Drouillard, a creole from Haiti. Both were killed during the Reign of Terror in 1794. His elder brother, Pierre-Vincent-Gatien de la Motte-Baracé, inherited the title of Marquis. Alexandre took up art to avoid politics.

In 1805, following his brother's marriage, he found himself alone and began to travel. While visiting Rome, and working as an amateur artist, he met Marie Marcoz, who was separated from her husband, and socialized in artistic circles. Shortly after, she became his mistress. Despite his distaste for politics, his position as a nobleman led to him to support the proposed Bourbon Restoration and, in 1813, begin working as an agent for them in Italy. The following year, he joined the National Guard.

He returned to France, with Marie, in 1815. There, he participated in the campaign of the Duc de Berry, and accompanied Louis XVIII to Belgium. That same year, he and Marie were married, leading to an estrangement from his family. He was named a Knight in the Legion of Honor in 1816.

During this time, he had also begun displaying his landscapes, anonymously, at several salons, and contributing articles to a number of journals, including the Gazette de France. As a result, he was elected an honorary member of the Académie des Beaux-Arts, becoming the first person to occupy Seat #10 in what is now known as the "Unattached" section. He was named a Counselor of State in 1821, under the sponsorship of Maréchal Jacques Lauriston. In this position, he was involved in diplomatic missions, and travelled extensively, painting in his spare time.

Marie died in 1828 and, following the July Revolution of 1830, he was removed from all of his official positions. Without them, his debts accumulated, and he became destitute. Eventually, he had to emigrate to avoid debtors' prison; settling in Switzerland, where he received support from his family. In 1832, his remaining properties were sold by his brother Pierre, under bankruptcy proceedings. Upon returning, in 1835, he married Wilhemine-Caroline Hoffmann (1810-1860), from Düsseldorf. He died in 1840, after a long illness.
