= The Dream of Happiness =

Painting by Constance Mayer and Pierre-Paul Prud'hon

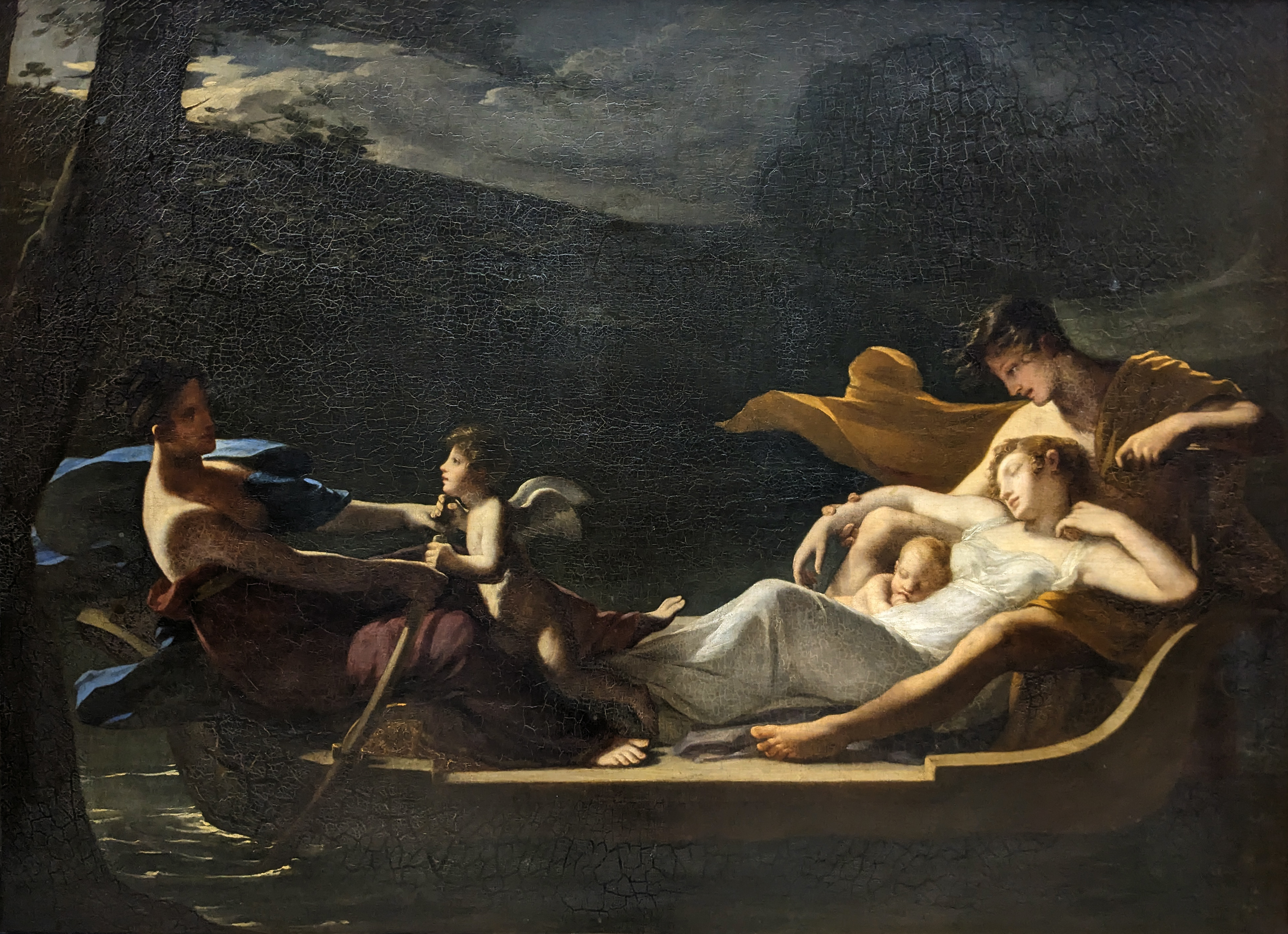
The Dream of Happiness (1819) by Constance Mayer and Pierre-Paul Prud'hon

The Dream of Happiness is an allegorical oil on canvas painting by Constance Mayer and Pierre-Paul Prud'hon, now in the Louvre.

== History ==
It was first exhibited as number 809 at the Paris Salon of 1819 and has remained in the French national collection ever since.

It shows a couple and their child in a boat rowed by Fortuna and steered by Cupid. Few of Mayer's sketches survived, but many of Prud'hon's have.

Studies

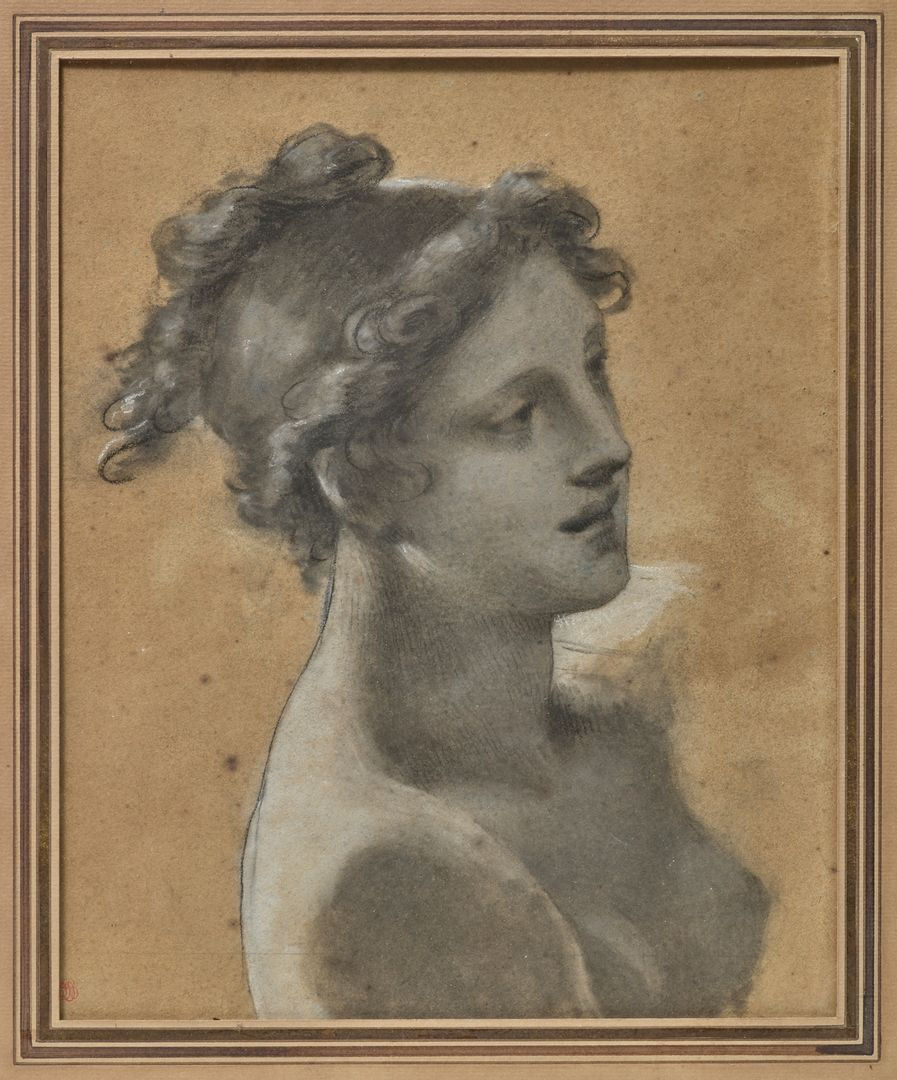
Prud'hon, Study of the Young Woman (1818), current location unknown.

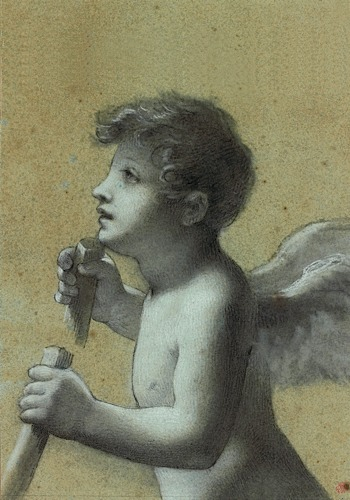
Prud'hon, Cupid Holding the Steering Oars (1819), current location unknown

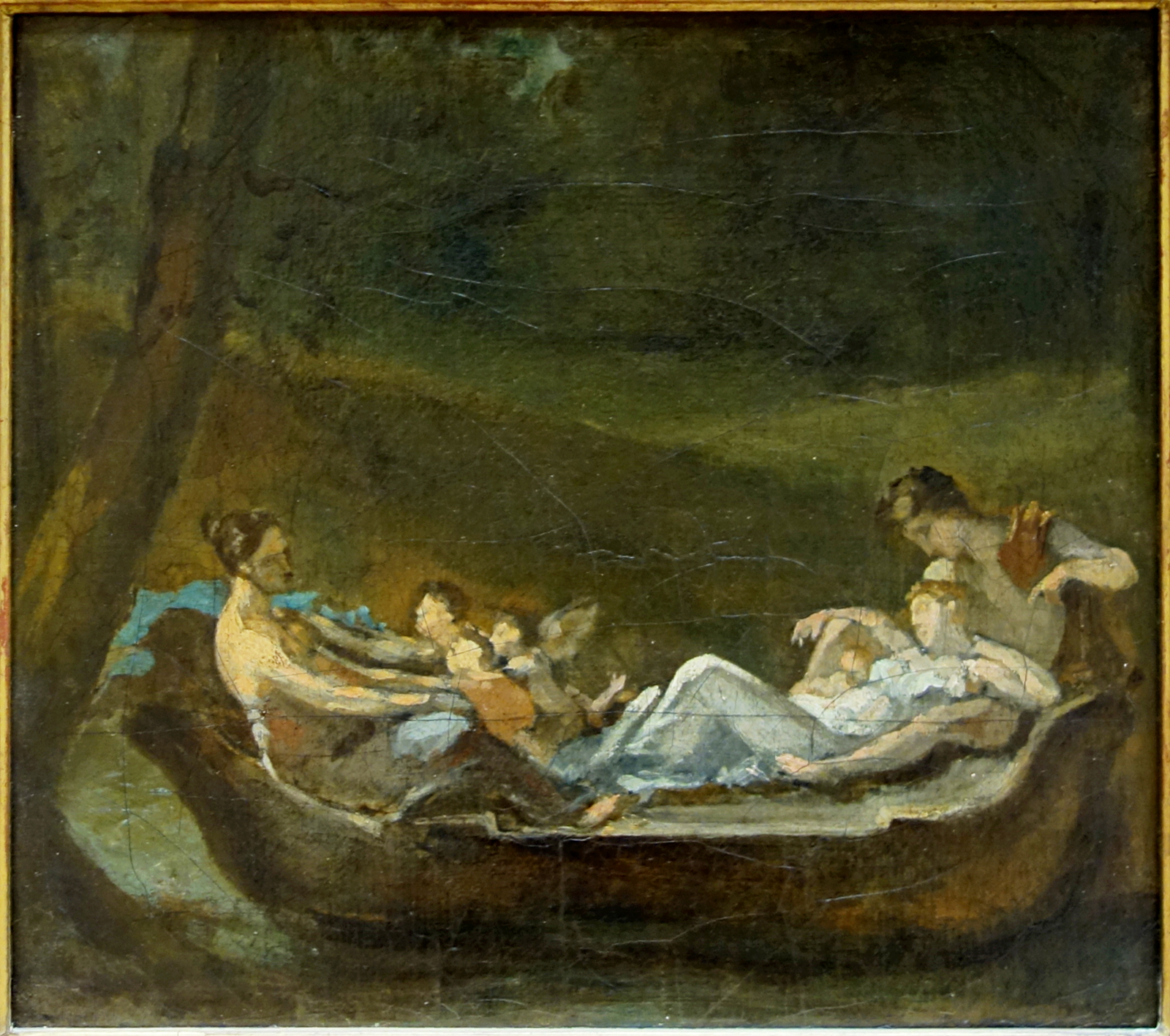
Prud'hon, Sketch (c. 1819), palais des Beaux-Arts de Lille.
