= Senonnes =

- Commune
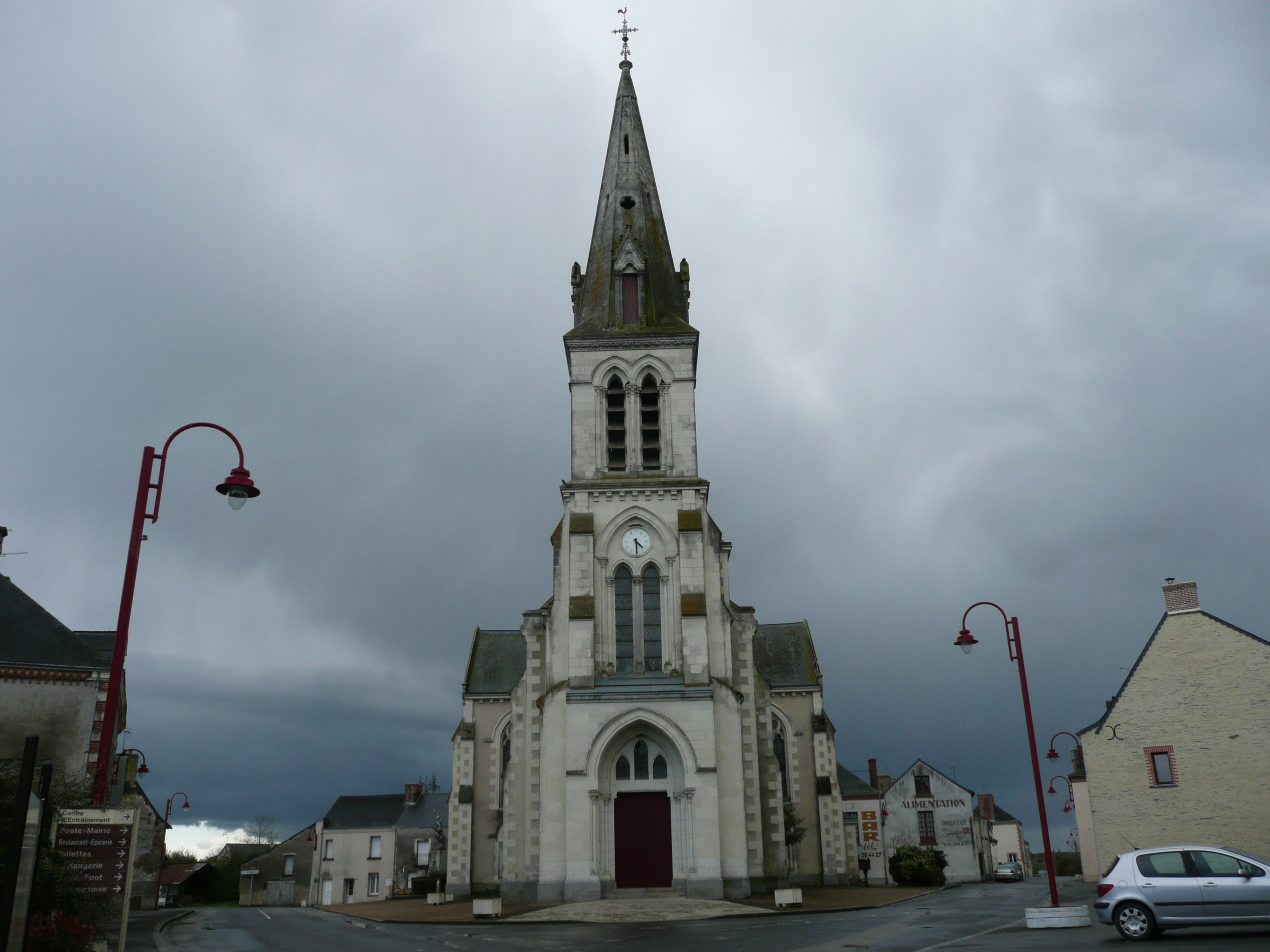
- The church in Senonnes

- Coat of arms
- Location of Senonnes
- Location within France Location within Pays de la Loire
- Coordinates: 47°47′59″N 1°12′05″W
- Country: France
- Region: Pays de la Loire
- Department: Mayenne
- Arrondissement: Château-Gontier
- Canton: Cossé-le-Vivien

Government
  - Mayor (2020–2026): Béatrice Barbé
- Area^{1}: 13.13 km^{2} (5.07 sq mi)
- Elevation: 90 m (300 ft)
- Highest elevation: 104 m (341 ft)
- Lowest elevation: 67 m (220 ft)
- Population (2023): 392
  - Density: 29.9/km^{2} (77.3/sq mi)
- Time zone: UTC+01:00 (CET)
  - Summer (DST): UTC+02:00 (CEST)
- INSEE/Postal code: 53259 /53390
- ^{1} French Land Register data, which excludes lakes, ponds, glaciers > 1 km^{2} (0.386 sq mi or 247 acres) and river estuaries.

Senonnes (French pronunciation: [sənɔn]) is a commune in the Mayenne department in north-western France.

== Geography ==
The Semnon flows westward through the southern part of the commune, crosses the village, then forms most of the commune's south-western border.

== See also ==
- Communes of the Mayenne department
