= Alexander the Great and Campaspe in the Studio of Apelles =

Painting by Giovanni Battista Tiepolo

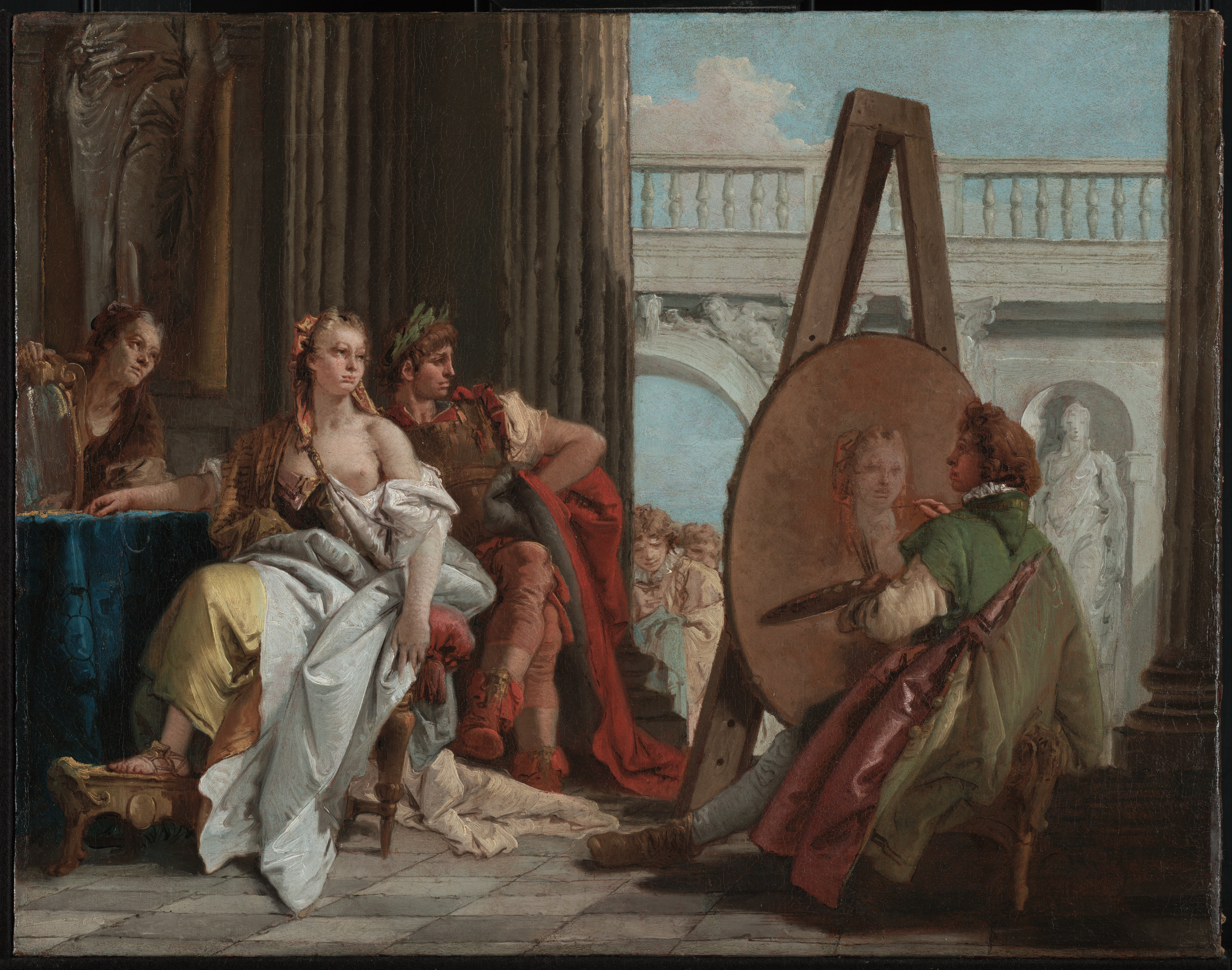
- Artist: Giovanni Battista Tiepolo
- Year: c.1740
- Type: Oil on canvas, history painting
- Dimensions: 42.5 cm × 54 cm (16.7 in × 21 in)
- Location: Getty Museum; Los Angeles

Alexander the Great and Campaspe in the Studio of Apelles is an c.1740 history painting by the Italian artist Giovanni Battista Tiepolo. It depicts a scene based on a story recorded by Pliny the Elder. Having commissioned a portrait painting of his lover Campaspe from the gifted court painter Apelles, Alexander the Great became aware of the love the artist felt for his mistress and relinquished her to him.

It was one of three paintings Tiepolo produced inspired by the legend. The painting is today in the Getty Museum in California. An earlier depiction by Tiepolo is now in the Museum of Fine Arts in Montreal.

The subject has been treated by a number of other artists including Jacques-Louis David's Apelles Painting Campaspe in the Presence of Alexander the Great.

== Bibliography ==
- Allan, Scott (ed.) Masterpieces of Painting: J. Paul Getty Museum. J. Paul Getty Museum, 2019
- Campbell, Elizabeth. Museum Worthy: Nazi Art Plunder in Postwar Western Europe. Oxford University Press, 2024.
- Crow, Thomas. Restoration: The Fall of Napoleon in the Course of European Art, 1812-1820. Princeton University Press, 2023.
