= Alexander the Great Giving Campaspe to Apelles =

Painting by Charles Meynier

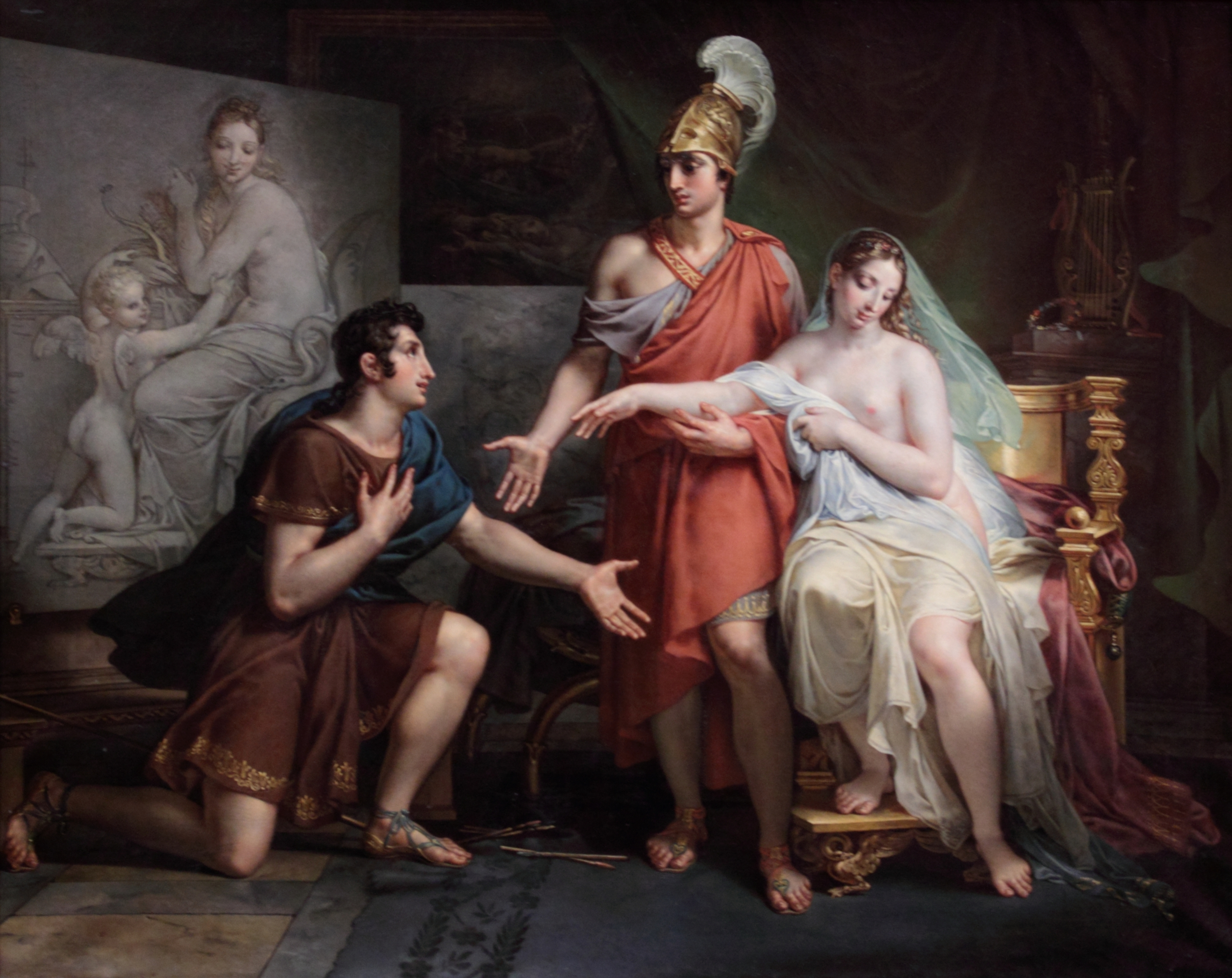
- Artist: Charles Meynier
- Year: 1822
- Type: Oil on canvas, history painting
- Dimensions: 111.5 cm × 145 cm (43.9 in × 57 in)
- Location: Museum of Fine Arts, Rennes

Alexander the Great Giving Campaspe to Apelles (French: Alexandre le Grand cédant Campaspe à Apelle is an 1822 history painting by the French artist Charles Meynier. It is inspired by a story recorded by Pliny the Elder. Alexander the Great, having commissioned from Apelles a painting depicting his favourite mistress Campaspe. Having examined the unfinished work, the genius of the painting makes him aware of how much the two are secretly in love. He gives his blessing to the couple, renouncing his claim to her. If is in the collection of the Museum of Fine Arts of Rennes in Brittany.

Meynier's contemporary Jacques-Louis David also produced a painting Apelles Painting Campaspe in the Presence of Alexander the Great of the same subject.

== Bibliography ==
- Crow, Thomas. Restoration: The Fall of Napoleon in the Course of European Art, 1812-1820. Princeton University Press, 2023.
- Ramade, Patrick. Première idée. Le Musée, 1987.
