= Campaspe =

Mistress of Alexander the Great

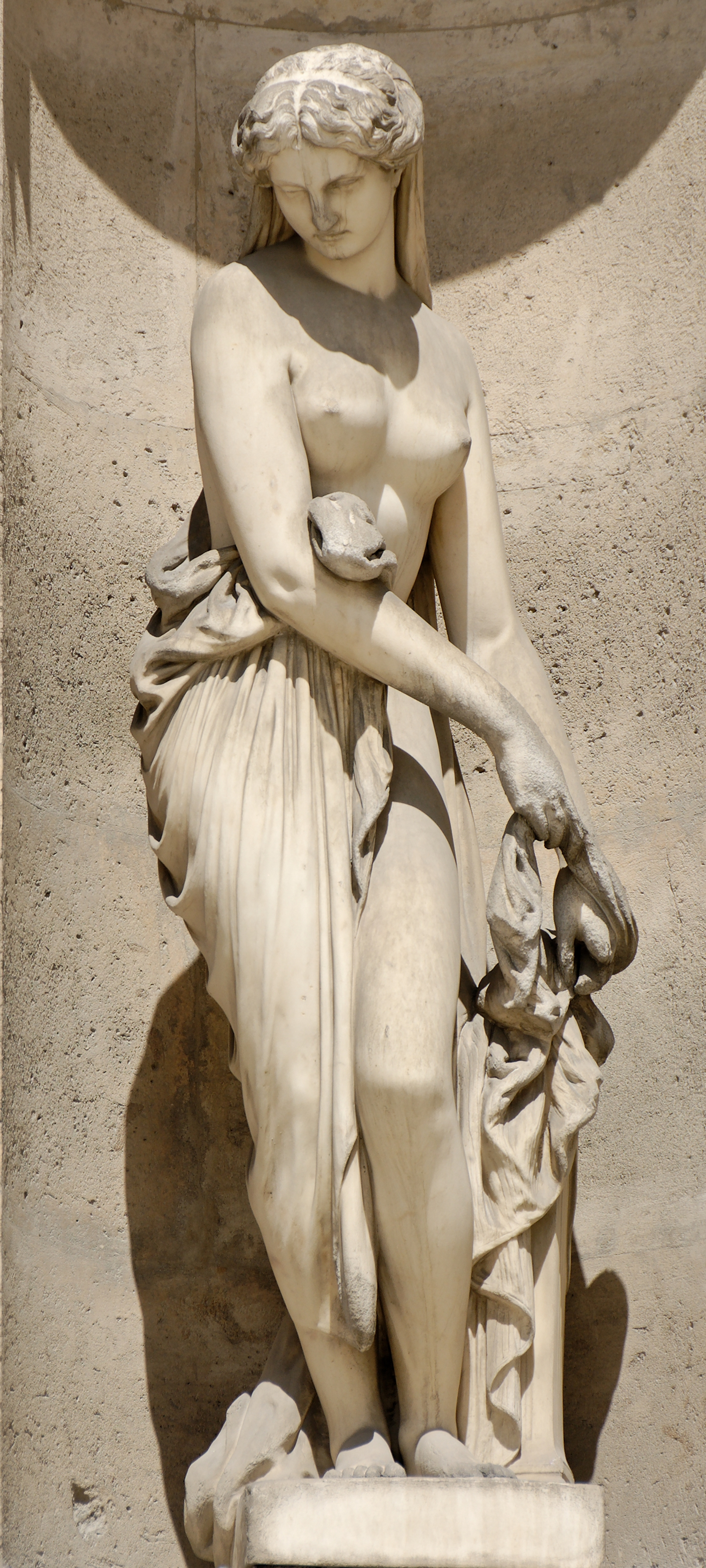
Campaspe Taking off Her Clothes in Front of Apelles by Order of Alexander, c. 1883 by Auguste Ottin (1811–1890). North façade of the Cour Carrée in the Louvre, Paris

Campaspe (/kæmˈpæspiː/; Greek: Καμπάσπη, Kampaspē), or Pancaste (/pæŋˈkæstiː/; Greek: Παγκάστη, Pankastē; also Pakate), (Note: Her Thessalian name is sometimes reported in Atticized form as Pancaste.) was a supposed mistress of Alexander the Great and a prominent citizen of Larissa in Thessaly. However, no Campaspe appears in the five major sources for the life of Alexander and the story may be apocryphal. The biographer Robin Lane Fox traces her legend back to the Roman authors Pliny (Natural History), Lucian of Samosata and Aelian (Varia Historia). Aelian surmised that she initiated the young Alexander in love.

According to tradition, she was painted by Apelles, who had the reputation in antiquity for being the greatest of painters. The episode occasioned an apocryphal exchange that was reported in Pliny's Natural History: "Seeing the beauty of the nude portrait, Alexander saw that the artist appreciated Campaspe (and loved her) more than he. And so Alexander kept the portrait, but presented Campaspe to Apelles." Fox describes this bequest as "the most generous gift of any patron and one which would remain a model for patronage and painters on through the Renaissance." Apelles also used Campaspe as a model for his most celebrated painting of Aphrodite emerging from the sea, the iconic Venus Anadyomene, "wringing her hair, and the falling drops of water formed a transparent silver veil around her form".

== Legacy ==
The English writer John Lyly used the story of Campaspe and Apelles for his 1584 comedy Campaspe, which inaugurated the golden period of the Elizabethan theatre.

The Spanish playwright Pedro Calderón de la Barca wrote his own play on the Campaspe story, Darlo todo y no dar nada (1651).

In 1819, the painting Generosity of Alexander by Jérôme-Martin Langlois depicted the scene where Alexander the Great gifted Campaspe to Apelles.

The Campaspe River in Victoria, Australia, the Campaspe River in Queensland, Australia and the Shire of Campaspe are named after her.

== Gallery ==
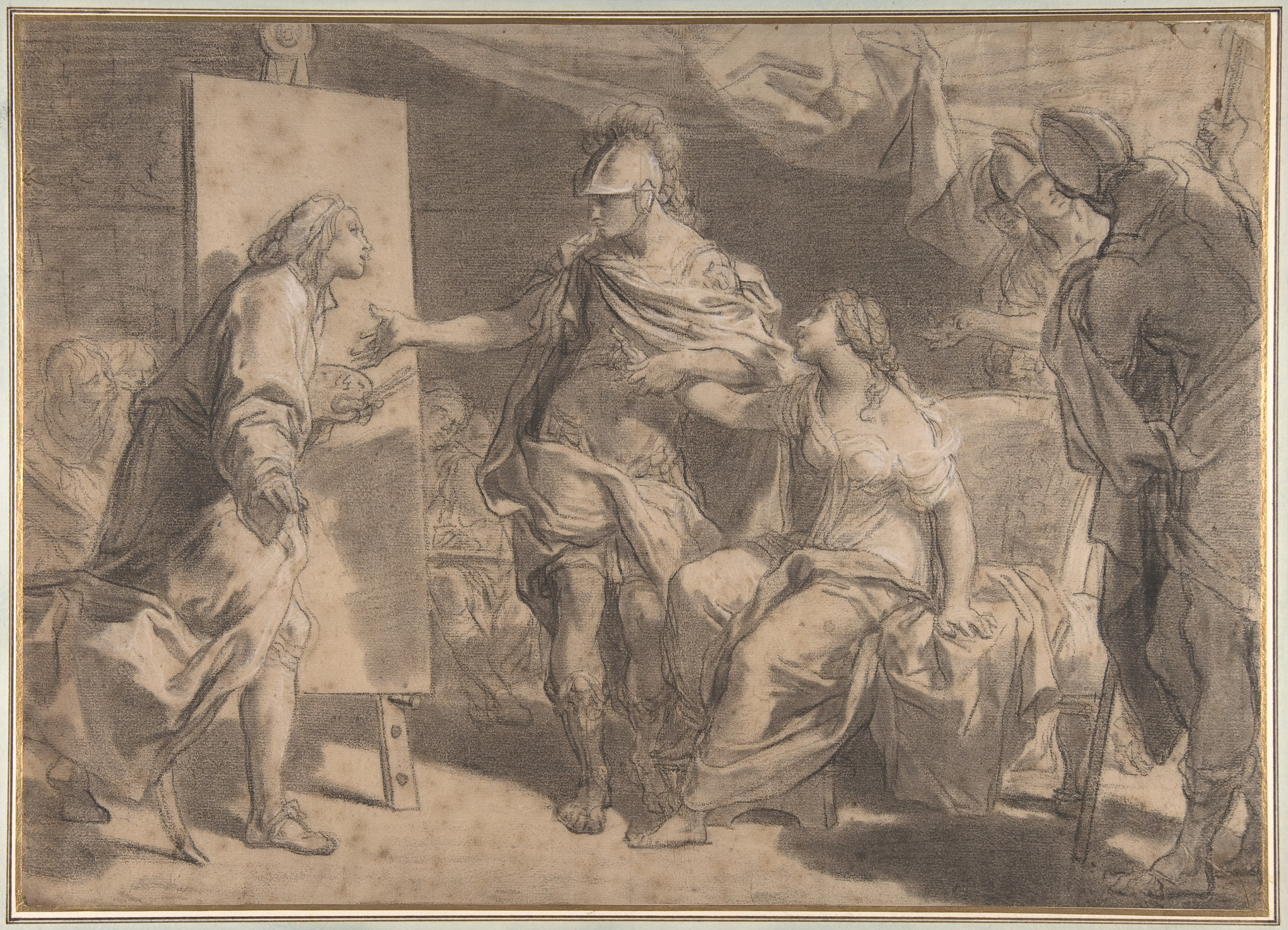
Alexander the Great Offering His Concubine Campaspe to the Painter Apelles by Gaetano Gandolfi, c. 1793–97

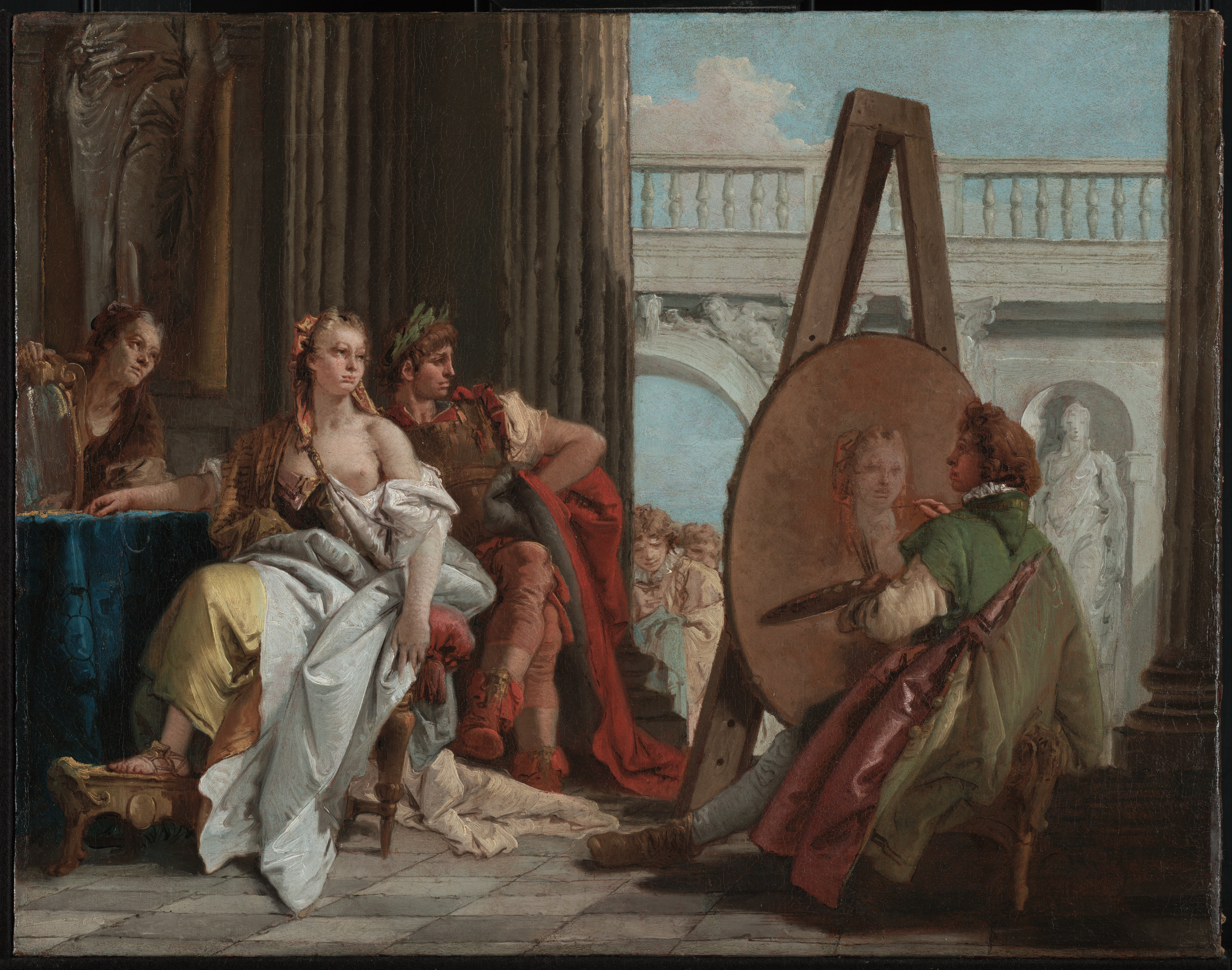
Alexander the Great and Campaspe in the Studio of Apelles by Giovanni Battista Tiepolo, 1740

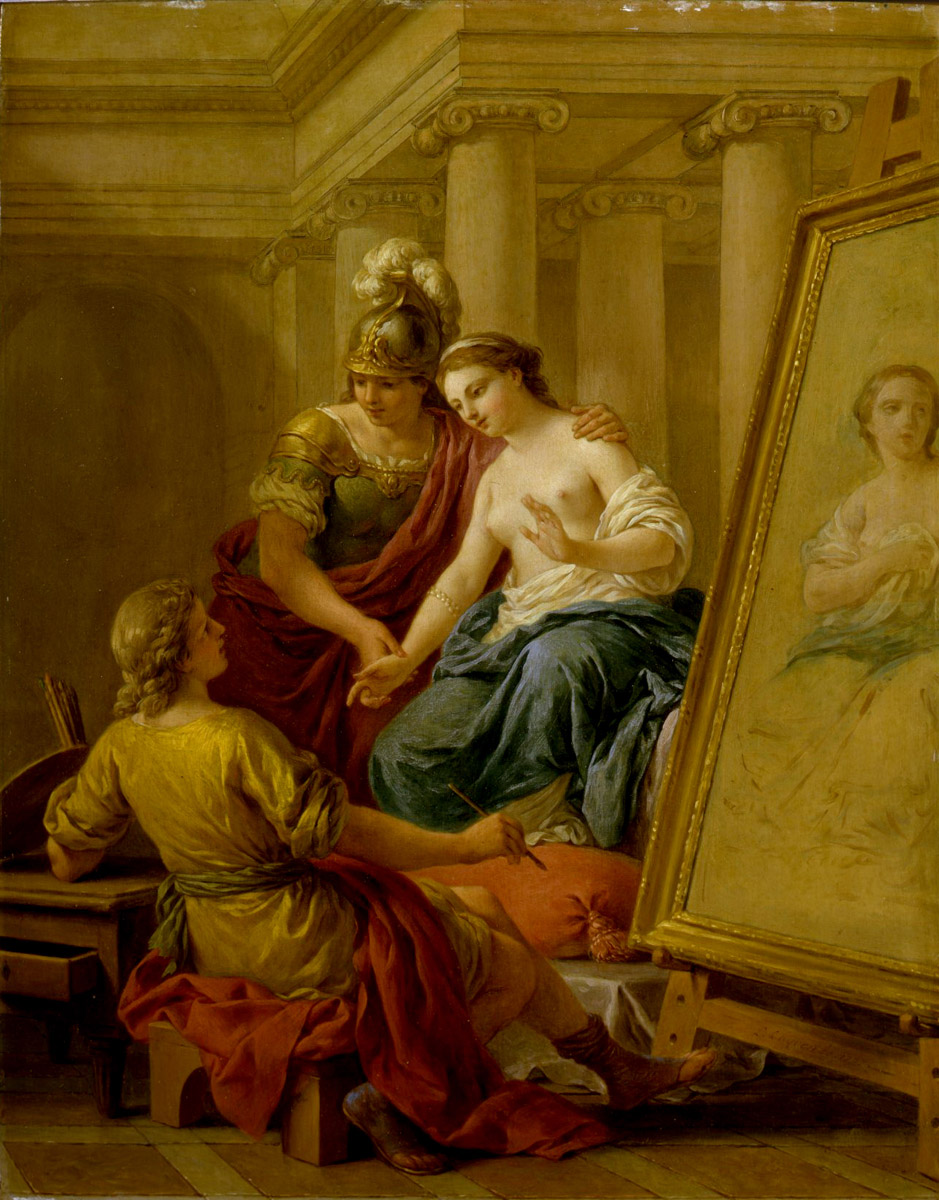
Apelles in Love with Alexander's Mistress by Louis-Jean-François Lagrenée, 1772

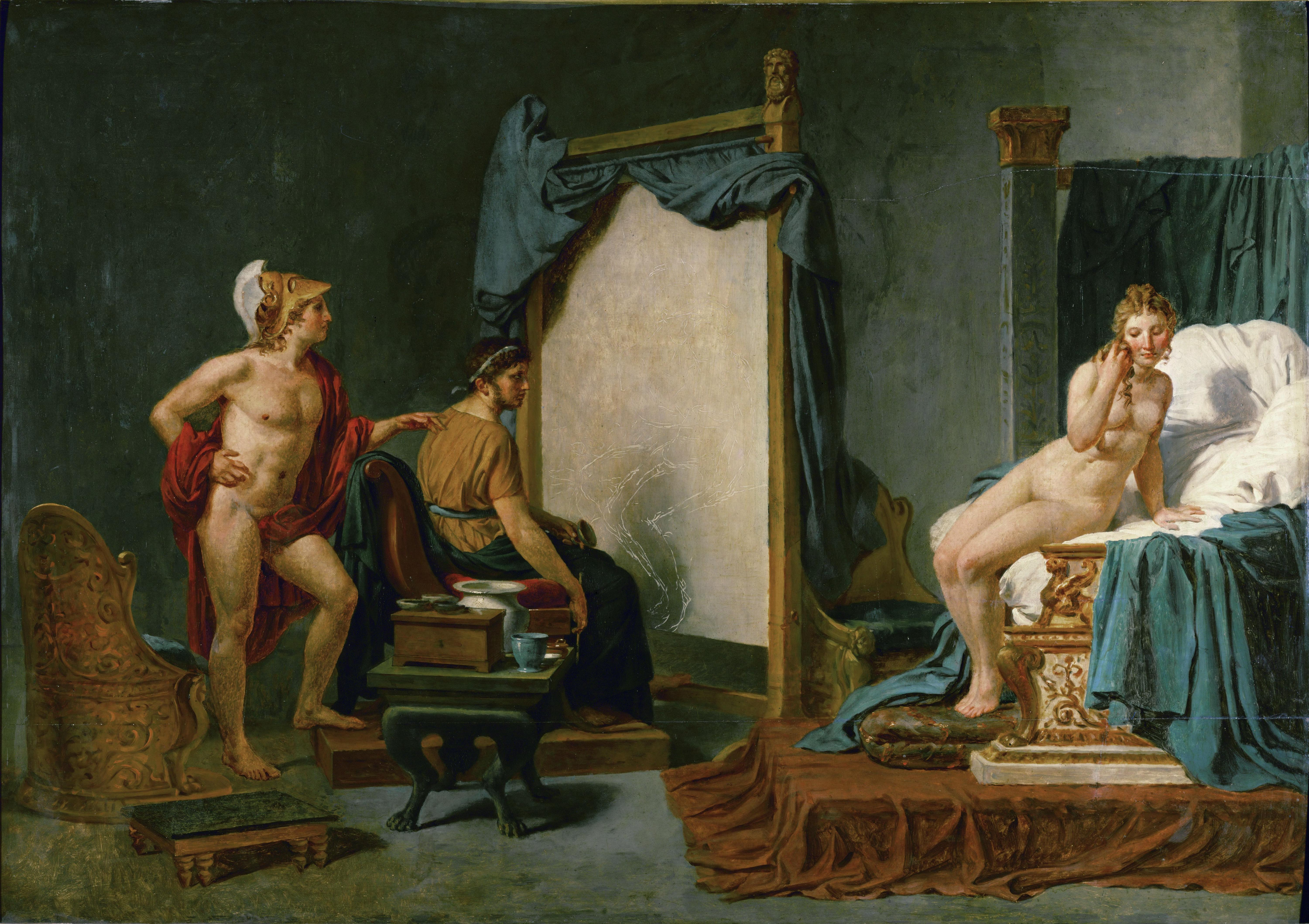
Apelles Painting Campaspe in the Presence of Alexander the Great by Jacques-Louis David, 1814

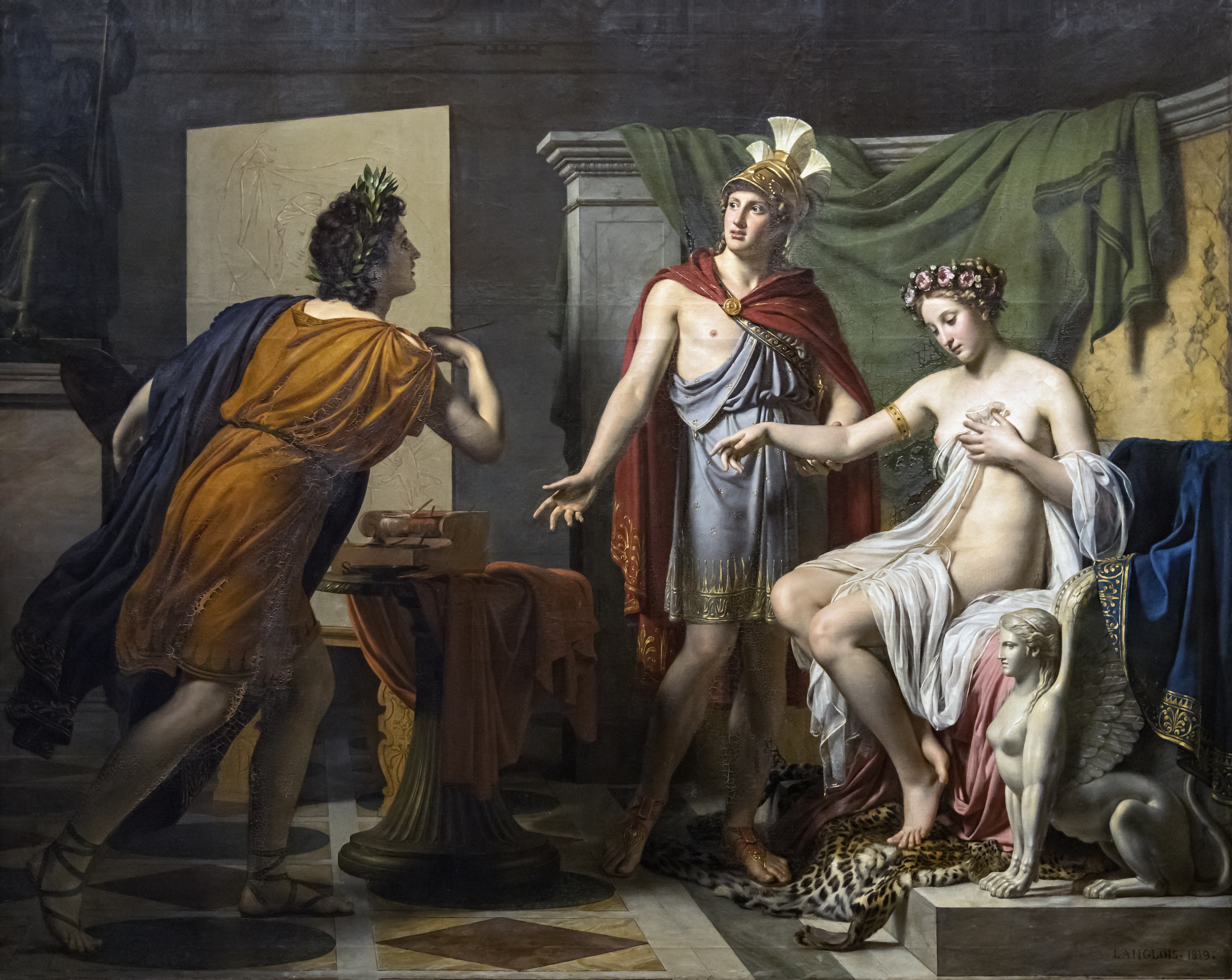
Generosity of Alexander by Jérôme-Martin Langlois, 1819

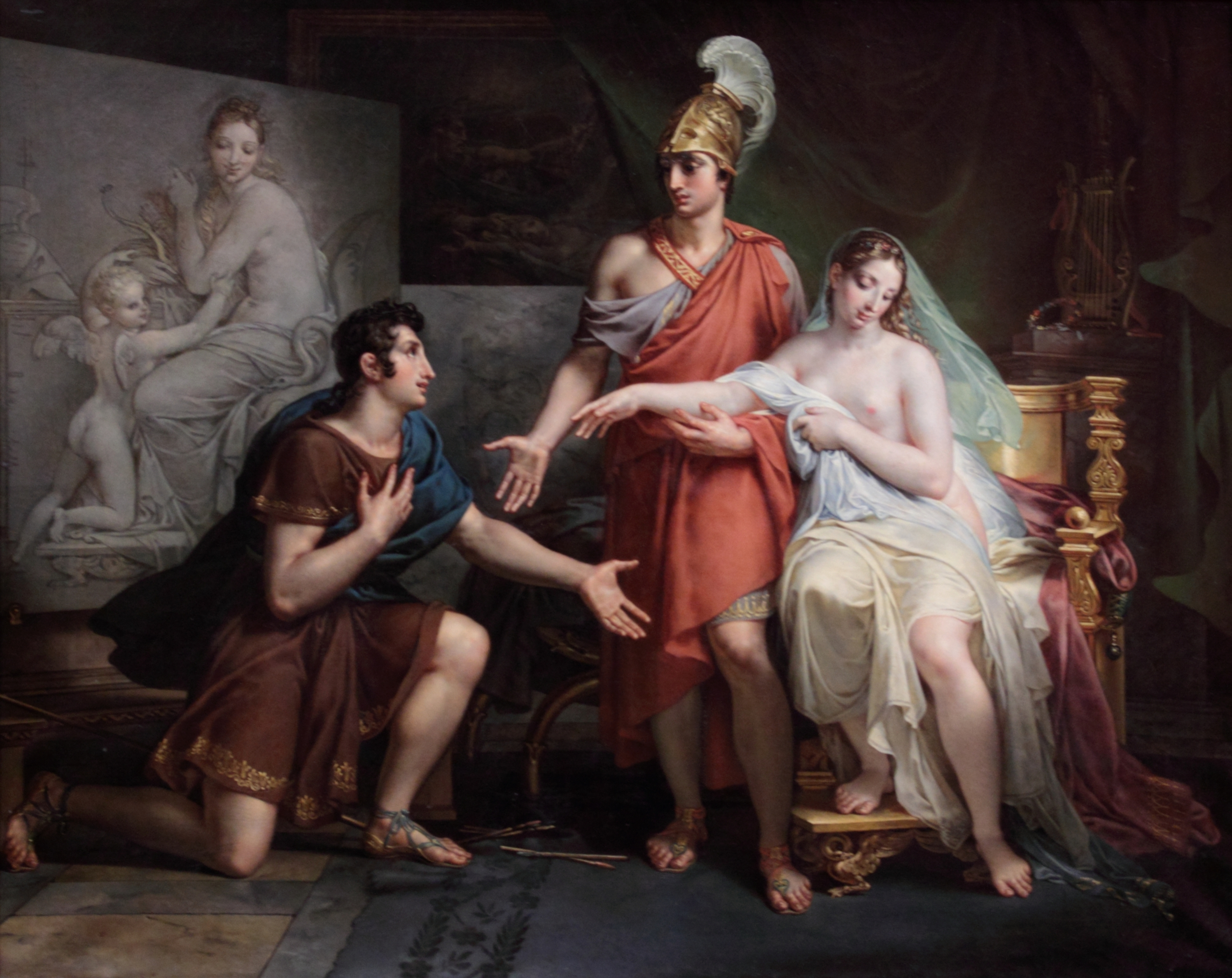
Alexander the Great Giving Campaspe to Apelles by Charles Meynier, 1822

== Sources ==
- Pothos.org: Alexander's lovers
- Harry Thurston Peck, Harper's Dictionary of Classical Antiquities, 1898 "Campaspe"
- John Lyly: "Cupid and my Campaspe..."
- John Lyly: A Moste Excellent Comedie of Alexander, Campaspe, and Diogenes 1584
