= Asclepiodorus =

Asclepiodorus /əˌskliːpioʊˈdɔːrəs/ or Asclepiodoros may refer to:

- Asclepiodorus (painter)
- Asclepiodorus of Macedon, son of Timander, was one of the generals of Alexander the Great
- Asclepiodorus, a sculptor mentioned by Pliny the Elder (Natural History, 34.19. § 26) as being famous for making statues of famous philosophers, about whom nothing further is known.
- Asclepiodotus (philosopher), a writer on tactics who is in several ancient texts called "Asclepiodorus"
