= Apelles =

4th-century BC Greek painter

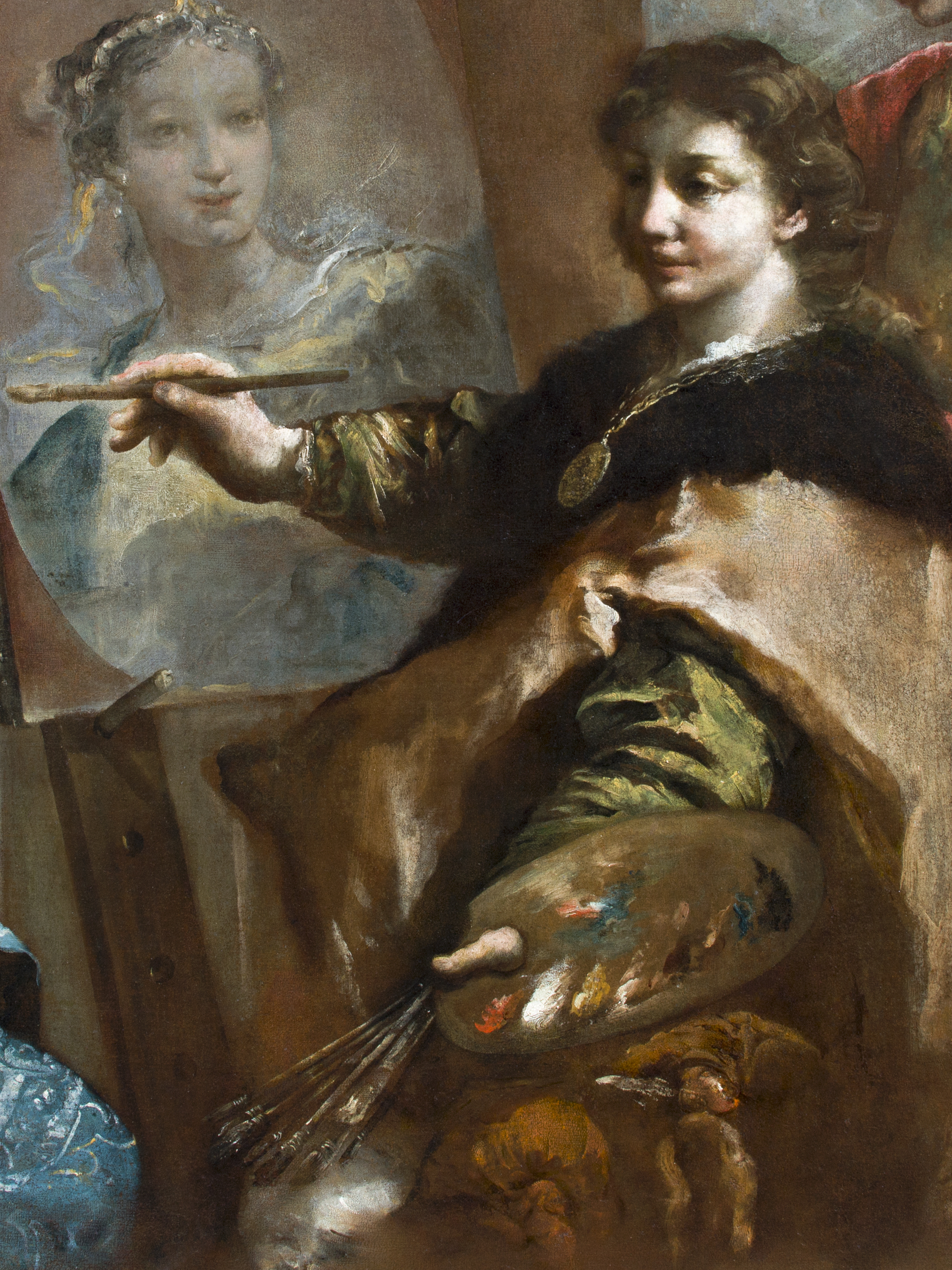
- Detail from Alexander and Campaspe in Apelles' Studio by Giovanni Antonio Guardi, c. 1745
- Notable work: Original Alexander Mosaic (supposedly); Portrait of Alexander the Great
- Patrons: Alexander the Great

Apelles of Kos (/əˈpɛliːz/; Ancient Greek: Ἀπελλῆς; fl. 4th century BC) was a renowned painter of ancient Greece. Pliny the Elder, to whom much of modern scholars' knowledge of this artist is owed (Naturalis Historia 35.36.79–97 and passim), rated him superior to preceding and subsequent artists. He dated Apelles to the 112th Olympiad (332–329 BC), possibly because he had produced a portrait of Alexander the Great.

== Biography ==
Probably born at Colophon in Ionia, he first studied under Ephorus of Ephesus, but after he had attained some celebrity, he became a student of Pamphilus at Sicyon; he thus combined the Dorian thoroughness with the Ionic grace. Attracted to the court of Philip II, he painted him and the young Alexander with such success that he became the recognized court painter of Macedon, and his picture of Alexander holding a thunderbolt ranked in the minds of many with the Alexander with the spear of the sculptor Lysippus. Hundreds of years later, Plutarch was among the unimpressed, deciding that it had failed to accurately reproduce Alexander's colouring: "He made Alexander's complexion appear too dark-skinned and swarthy, whereas we are told that he was fair-skinned, with a ruddy tinge that showed itself especially upon his face and chest."

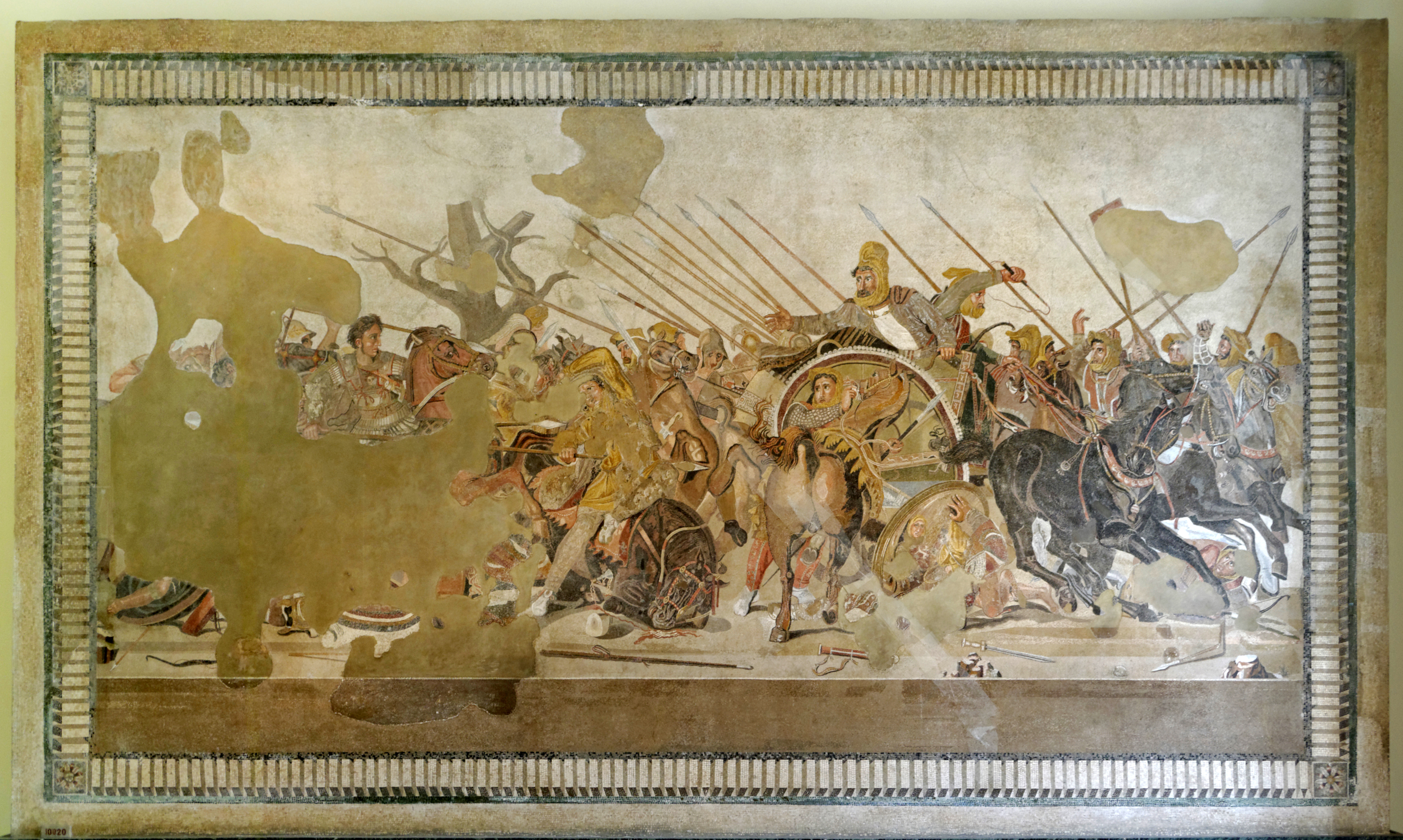
Reconstruction of a mosaic depiction of the Battle of Issus after a painting supposed to be by Apelles or Philoxenus of Eretria found in the House of the Faun at Pompeii

Much of what is known of Apelles is derived from Pliny the Elder (Natural History, XXXV). His skill at drawing the human face is the focus of a story connecting him with Ptolemy I Soter. This one-time general of Alexander disliked Apelles while they both were in Alexander's retinue. Many years later, while travelling by sea, a storm forced Apelles to land in Ptolemy's Egyptian kingdom. Ptolemy's jester was suborned by Apelles' rivals to convey to the artist a spurious invitation to dine with Ptolemy. Apelles' unexpected arrival enraged the king. Ptolemy demanded to know who had given Apelles the invitation, and with a piece of charcoal from the fireplace, Apelles drew a likeness on the wall, which Ptolemy recognized as his jester in the first strokes of the sketch.

Apelles was a contemporary of Protogenes, whose reputation he advocated. Pliny also recorded an anecdote that was making the rounds among Hellenistic connoisseurs of the first century CE: Apelles travelled to Protogenes' home in Rhodes to make the acquaintance of this painter he had heard so much about. Arriving at Protogenes' studio, he encountered an old woman who told him that Protogenes was out and asked for his name so she could report who had enquired after him. Observing in the studio a panel Protogenes had prepared for a painting, Apelles walked over to the easel, and, taking up a brush, told the servant to tell Protogenes "this came from me," and drew in colour an extremely fine line across the panel. When Protogenes returned, and the old woman explained what had taken place, he examined the line and pronounced that only Apelles could have done so perfect a piece of work; Protogenes then dipped a brush into another colour and drew a still finer line above the first one, and asked his servant to show this to the visitor should he return. When Apelles returned and was shown Protogenes' response, ashamed that he might be bettered, he drew in a third colour an even finer line between the first two, leaving no room for another display of craftsmanship. On seeing this, Protogenes admitted defeat and went out to seek Apelles and meet him face-to-face. Pliny claims that this painting had been part of the collection of Julius Caesar but was destroyed when Caesar's mansion on the Palatine Hill burned down circa 4 CE.

While sketching one of Alexander the Great's concubines, Campaspe, Apelles fell in love with her. As a mark of appreciation for the great painter's work, Alexander presented her to him.

Apelles is said to have been working on a painting of Aphrodite of Kos when he died, and the painting was left unfinished, for no one had skill enough to complete it.

The renowned work of Apelles provided several exemplars for the narrative realism admired by Greco-Roman connoisseurs, succinctly expressed in Horace's words ut pictura poesis, "as is painting so is poetry." Apelles seemed to have had a taste for elaborate allegory and personification, which he carried far in his rendering of Calumny, described by Lucian, in which an innocent youth is falsely accused by Ignorance, Envy, Treachery and Deceit. The story occasioning the painting was alleged to have been false accusations by a rival artist that Apelles took part in a conspiracy against Ptolemy IV Philopator. This almost led to the artist's execution. "In the Renaissance the exemplar of the poetic painting which was invariably cited whenever the art-poetry question was discussed was the Calumny of Apelles, known through Lucian's description." Sandro Botticelli's panel of Calumny of Apelles was painted in conscious striving to equal the painting in Lucian's ekphrasis.

The Pyrrhonist philosopher Sextus Empiricus used Apelles in an analogy for how ataraxia (i.e., freedom from mental perturbance) is achieved. The acquisition of ataraxia was likened to the process where Apelles was trying to paint a horse. He wished to represent its foam (in Greek mythology, Poseidon created horses out of sea foam). He was so unsuccessful that, in a rage, he gave up and threw the sponge he was using to clean his brushes with at the medium, and its mark produced the effect of the horse's foam.

Surviving depictions of Venus Anadyomene in Roman art
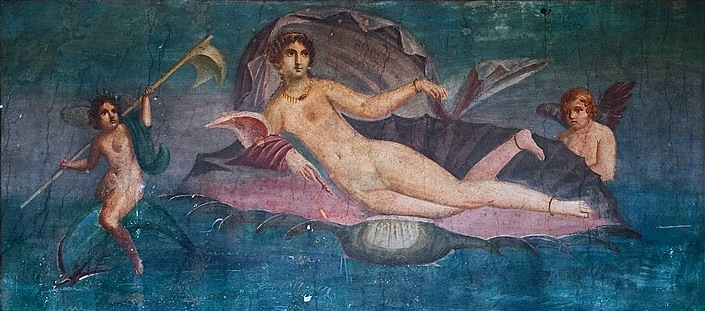
A garden fresco from the House of Venus, in Pompeii.

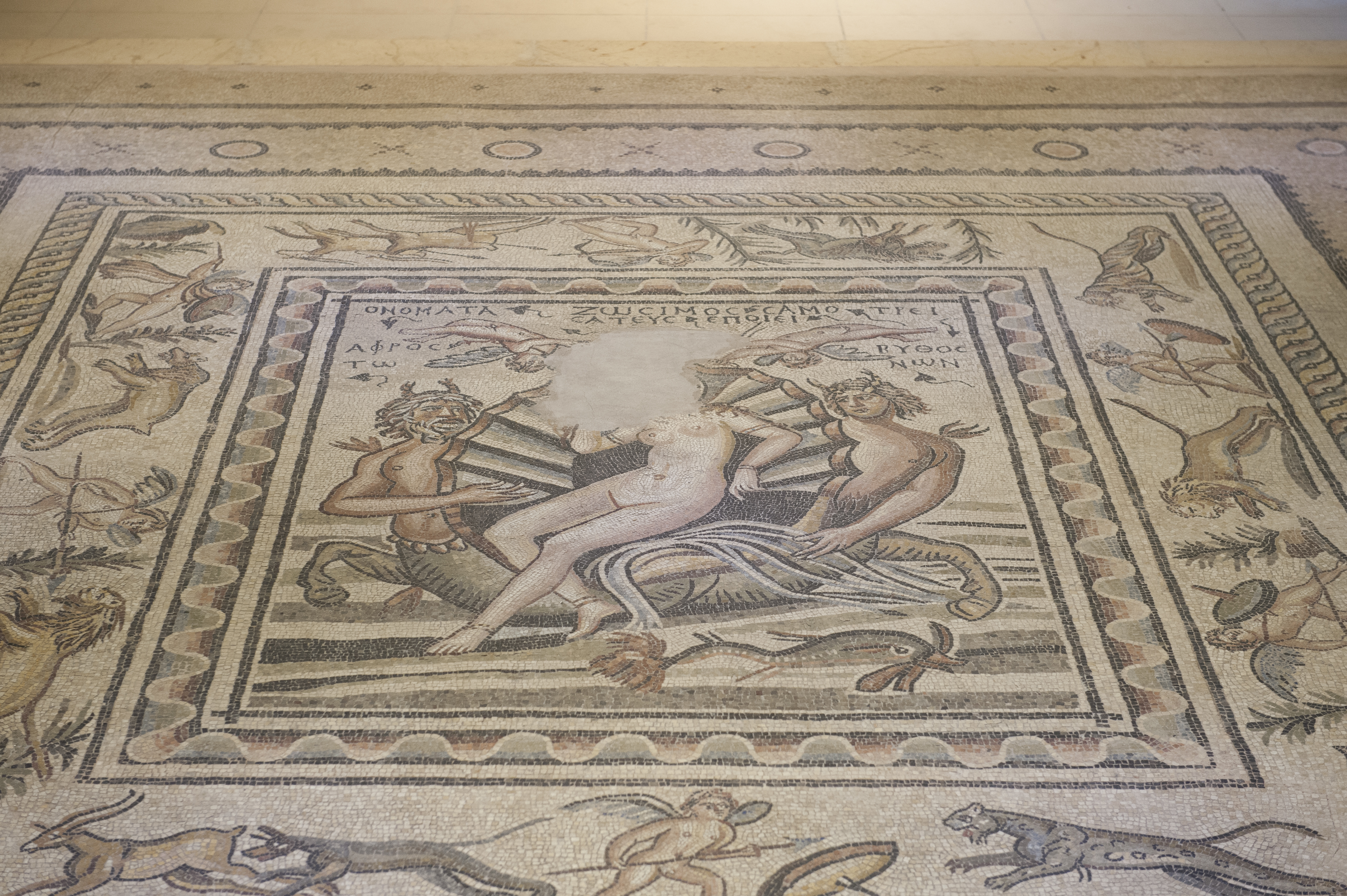
A mosaic in the Zeugma Mosaic Museum in Gaziantep, Turkey.

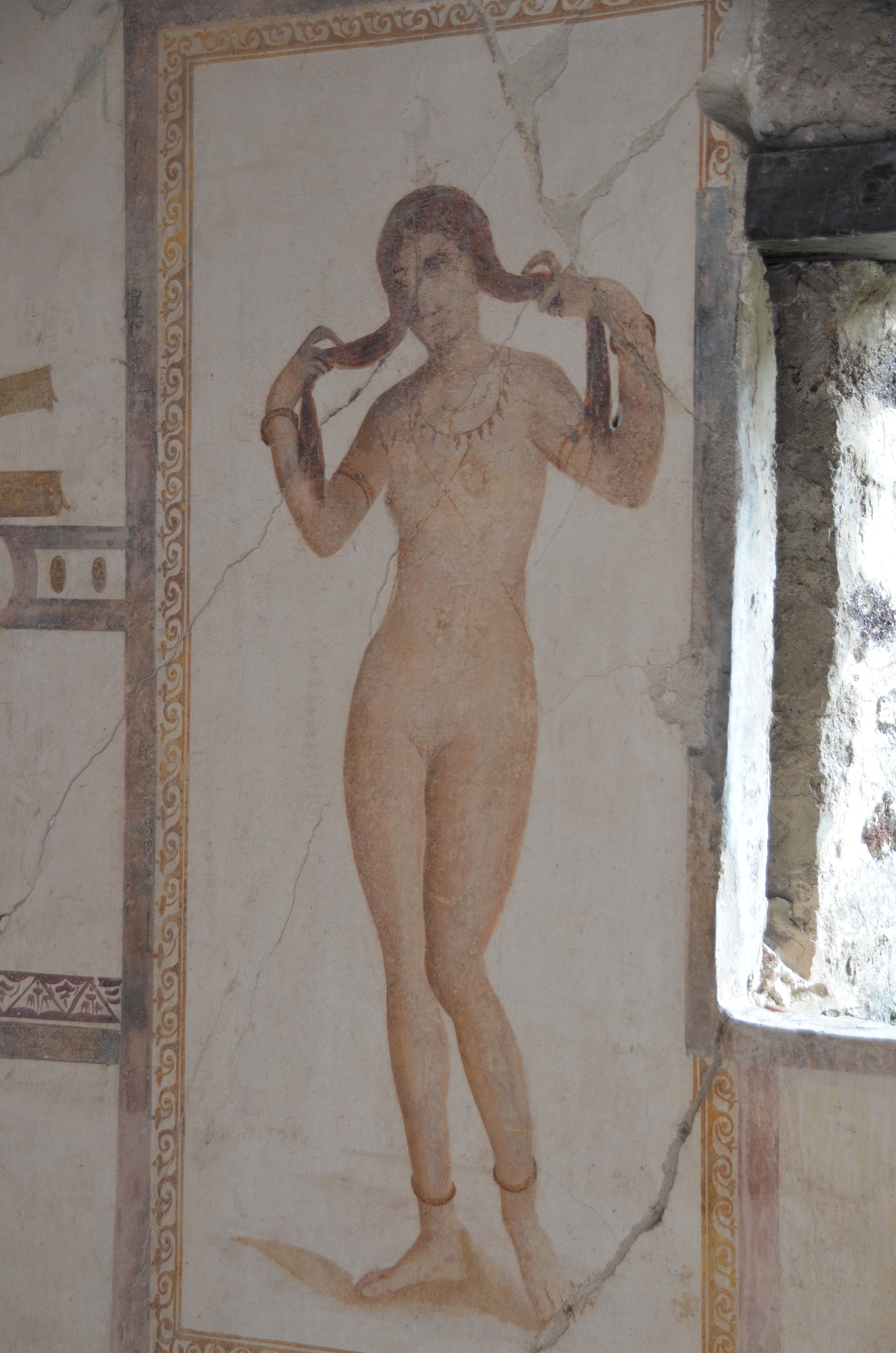
A fresco from the House of the Prince of Naples in Pompeii.

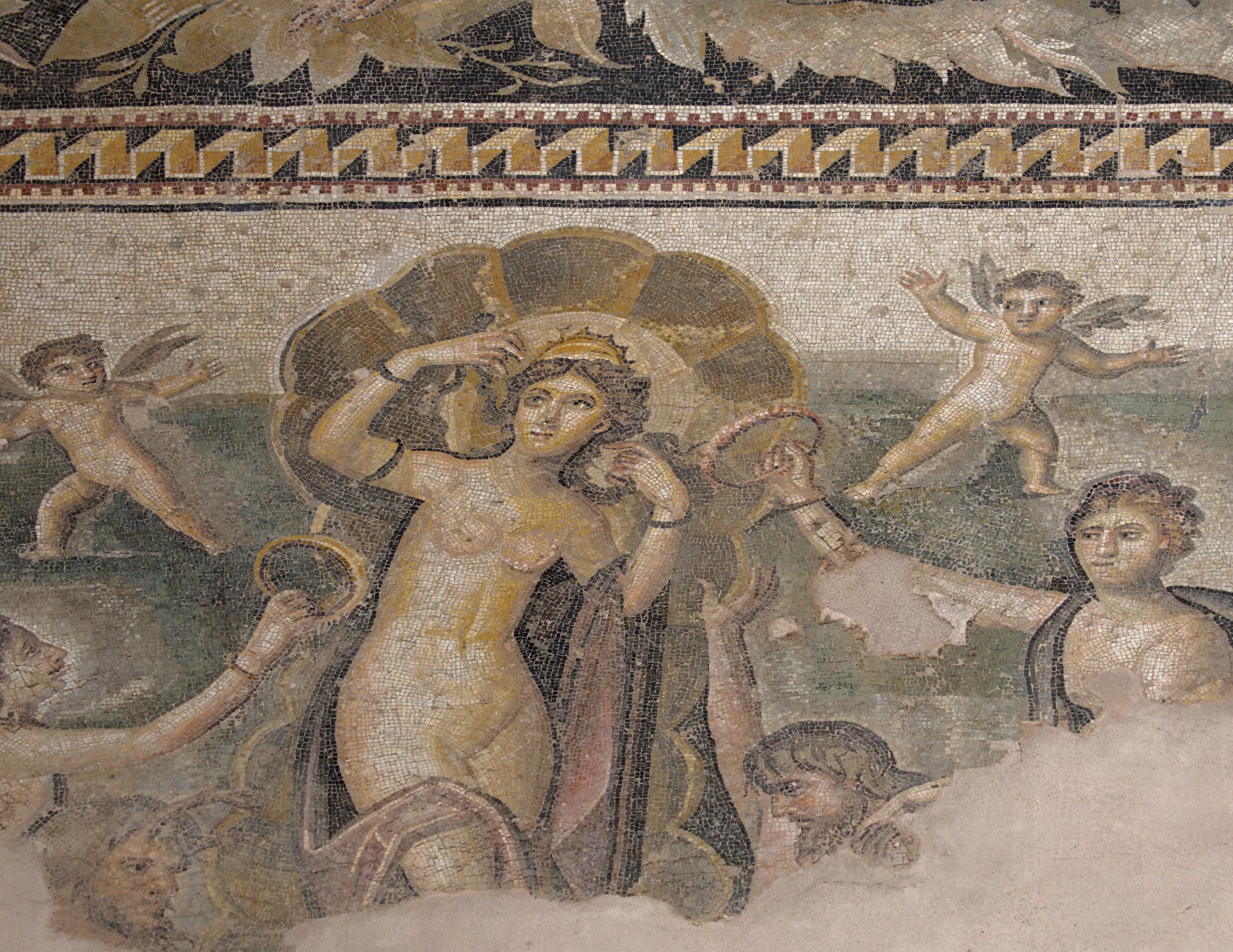
Detail from a mosaic in the Antakya Archaeological Museum in Antakya, Turkey.
The Venus Anadyomene was one of Apelles most famous paintings, brought to Rome by Augustus.

== Works ==
Apelles' paintings (none of which survive) included:

- Alexander Wielding a Thunderbolt, one of the many he did of both Alexander and his father Philip;
- Aphrodite Anadyomene ("Aphrodite Rising from the Sea"), showing the goddess rising from the sea (not the painting he was working on when he died, but an earlier painting), for which Pliny the Elder relates the tradition he used a former mistress of Alexander, Campaspe, as his model for Aphrodite. According to Athenaeus, the idea of Aphrodite Rising from the Sea was inspired by Phryne who during the time of the festivals of the Eleusinia and Poseidonia had no problem swimming nude in the sea.
- A portrait of Antigonus I Monophthalmus on horseback, in a three-quarters view which artfully concealed the subject's blind eye;
- A portrait of Artemis surrounded by a group of maidens offering a sacrifice, based on Odyssey 6.102ff;
- Sacrifice in Cos, described in the Mimes (4.59) of Herodas.
- The portraits of Clitus the Black and Archelaus I of Macedon.
- The procession of the high priest of Artemis at Ephesus.
- The great allegory of Calumny.

A number of his paintings were taken to Rome (including Aphrodite Anadyomene) and placed there on public display; in two compositions featuring portraits of Alexander (Castor and Pollux with Victory and Alexander the Great, and The Figure of War with his Hands Tied Behind Him Following the Triumphal Chariot of Alexander) the Emperor Claudius later had Alexander's face replaced with that of his grandfather Augustus.

== Legacy ==
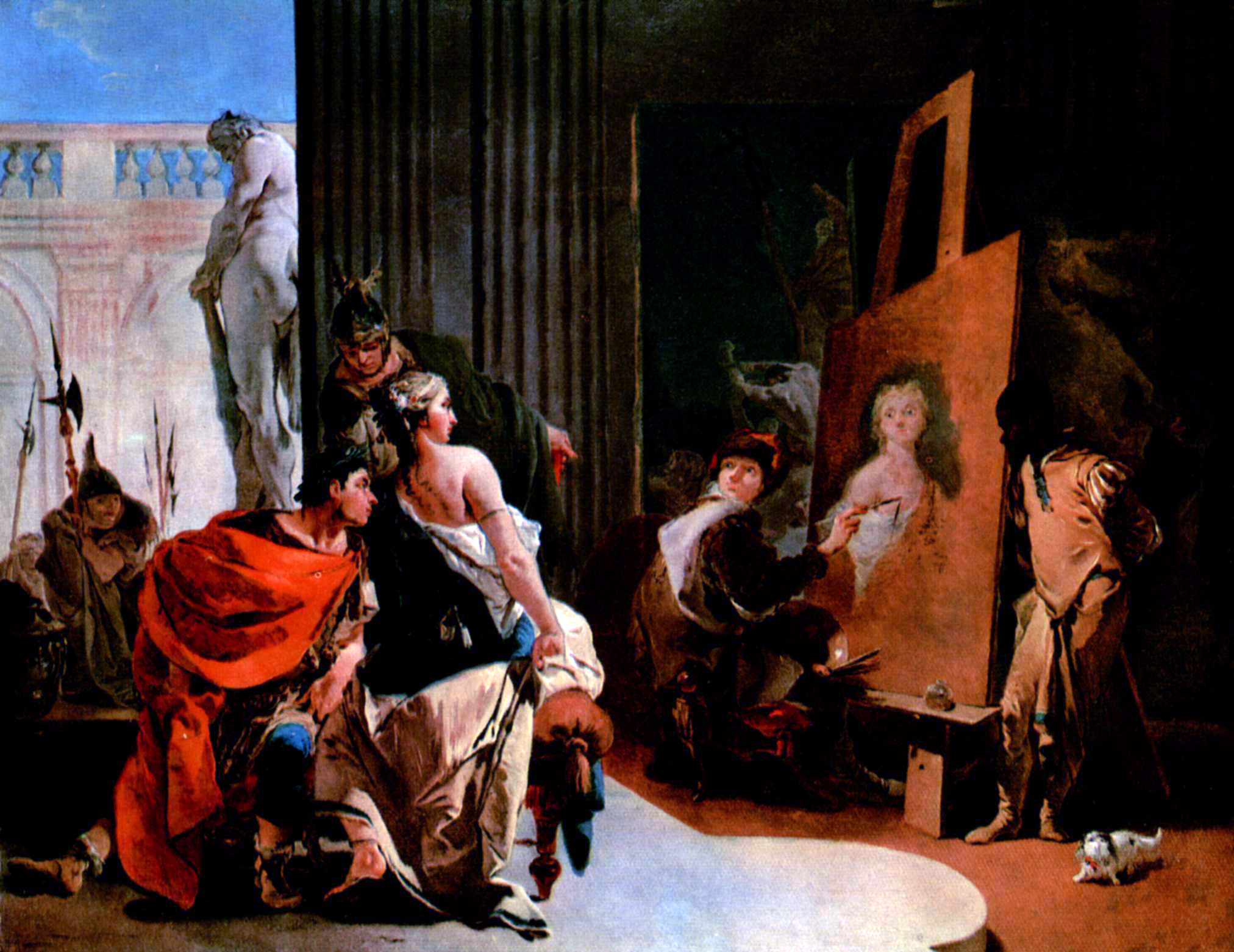
Alexander the Great and Campaspe in the Studio of Apelles, by Giovanni Battista Tiepolo

An assessment by the classical scholar Percy Gardner in the Encyclopædia Britannica Eleventh Edition reads:

Few things are more hopeless than the attempt to realize the style of a painter whose works have vanished. But a great wealth of stories, true or invented, clung to Apelles in antiquity; and modern archaeologists have naturally tried to discover what they indicate.

We are told, for example, that he attached great value to the drawing of outlines, practising every day. The tale is well known of his visit to Protogenes, and the rivalry of the two masters as to which could draw the finest and steadiest line. The power of drawing such lines is conspicuous in the decoration of red-figured vases of Athens. Apelles is said to have treated his rival with generosity, for he increased the value of his pictures by spreading a report that he meant to buy them and sell them as his own.

Apelles allowed the superiority of some of his contemporaries in particular matters: according to Pliny he admired the dispositio of Melanthius, i.e. the way in which he spaced his figures, and the mensurae of Asclepiodorus, who must have been a great master of symmetry and proportion. It was especially in that undefinable quality "grace" that Apelles excelled. He probably used but a small variety of colours, and avoided elaborate perspective: simplicity of design, beauty of line and charm of expression were his chief merits. When the naturalism of some of his works is praised—for example, the hand of his Alexander is said to have stood out from the picture—we must remember that this is the merit always ascribed by ignorant critics to works which they admire. In fact the age of Alexander was one of notable idealism, and probably Apelles succeeded in a marked degree in imparting to his figures a beauty beyond nature.

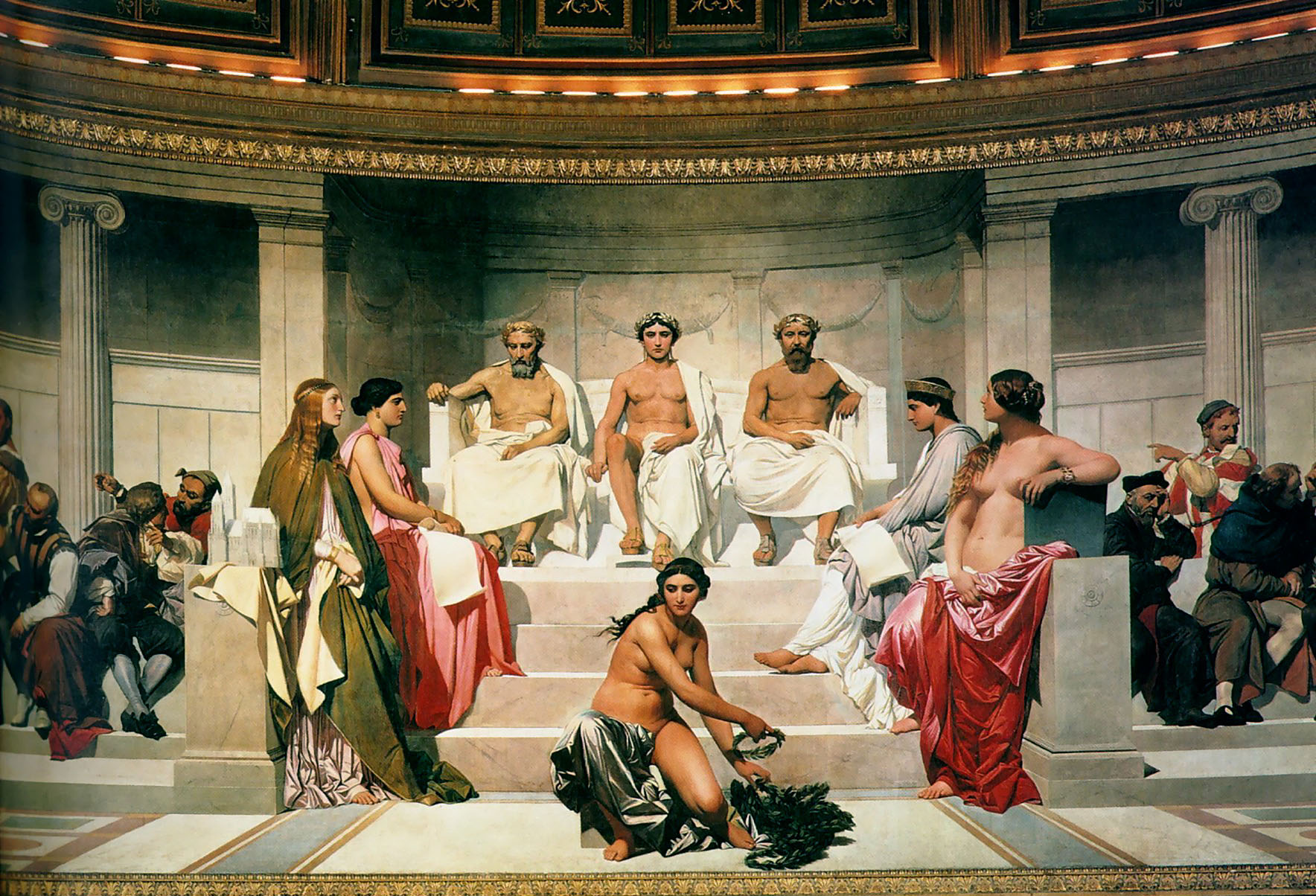
In this painting by artist Paul Delaroche, Apelles is depicted enthroned in the center.

Pliny connects a number of sayings to Apelles, which may come from Apelles' lost treatise on the art of painting. One comes from Apelles' judgement on Protogenes, that Protogenes knew when his painting was finished: quod manum de tabula scirat—"[He knew] when to take the hand from the picture." Another refers to his practice of exhibiting his works in the front of his shop, then hiding nearby to hear the comments of passers-by. When a cobbler commented on his mistakes in painting a shoe, Apelles made the corrections that very night; the next morning the cobbler noticed the changes, and proud of his effect on the artist's work began to criticize how Apelles portrayed the leg—whereupon Apelles emerged from his hiding-place to state: Ne sutor ultra crepidam—"Let the shoemaker venture no further than the shoe." The last saying Pliny attributes to Apelles refers to the painter's diligence at practising his art every day: Nulla dies sine linea—"Not a day without a line drawn." Apelles was also reportedly asked why he touched and retouched his paintings so continually, trying to achieve perfection (at least in his own mind); to which he replied, "I paint for eternity."

Pliny states that Apelles made a number of useful innovations to the art of painting, but his recipe for a black varnish, called by Pliny atramentum—which served both to preserve his paintings and to soften their colour, and created an effect that Pliny praises to no end—Apelles kept secret and was lost with his death.

There can be little doubt that Apelles was one of the most bold and progressive of artists. Such was his fame that several Italian Renaissance painters repeated his subjects, in a vain hope of giving some notion of the composition of them. Raphael may have portrayed himself as Apelles in The School of Athens and Sandro Botticelli based two paintings—The Birth of Venus and Calumny of Apelles—on his works. The 15th-century mathematician Luca Pacioli, when praising Leonardo da Vinci's work in Milan, including his Last Supper, stated that even Apelles must now give way to Leonardo as history's greatest artist.

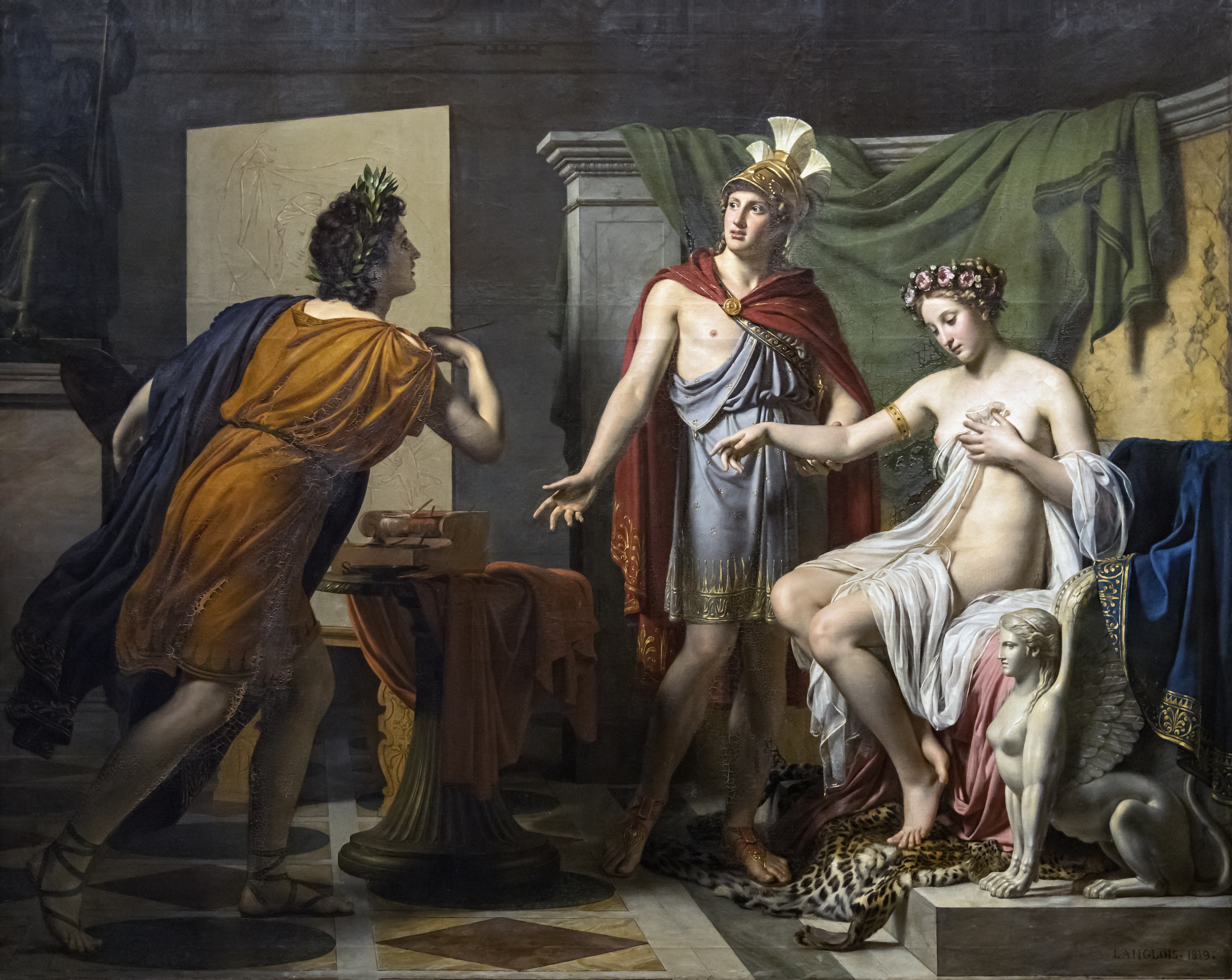
Jérôme-Martin Langlois depicted the story of Alexander the Great gifting his concubine Campaspe to Apelles in the 1819 painting Generosity of Alexander

In 1819, the painting Generosity of Alexander, by Jérôme-Martin Langlois depicted the story of Alexander the Great gifting his concubine, Campaspe to Apelles.

== References and sources ==
=== Sources ===
- Pliny the Elder, Historia Naturalis xxxv, 91 ff.
- Woltmann and Woermann, History of Painting, volume i (English translation, New York, 1886)
- Houssaye, Histoire d'Apelles (Paris, 1867)
- Wustmann, Apelles' Leben und Werke (Leipzig, 1870)
- Ernst H. Gombrich, 'The Heritage of Apelles', The Heritage of Apelles: Studies in the Art of Renaissance, (Cornell University Press: Ithaca, New York, 1976), pp 3–18.
- John J. Popovic, "Apelles, the greatest painter of Antiquity" Source quotes from Pliny's Natural History.
- (rodcorp) "Giotto's circle, Apelles' lines, Chuang-tzu's crab": Tracing a literary topos.
