= Generosity of Alexander =

1819 painting by Jérôme-Martin Langlois

- French: Générosité d'Alexandre
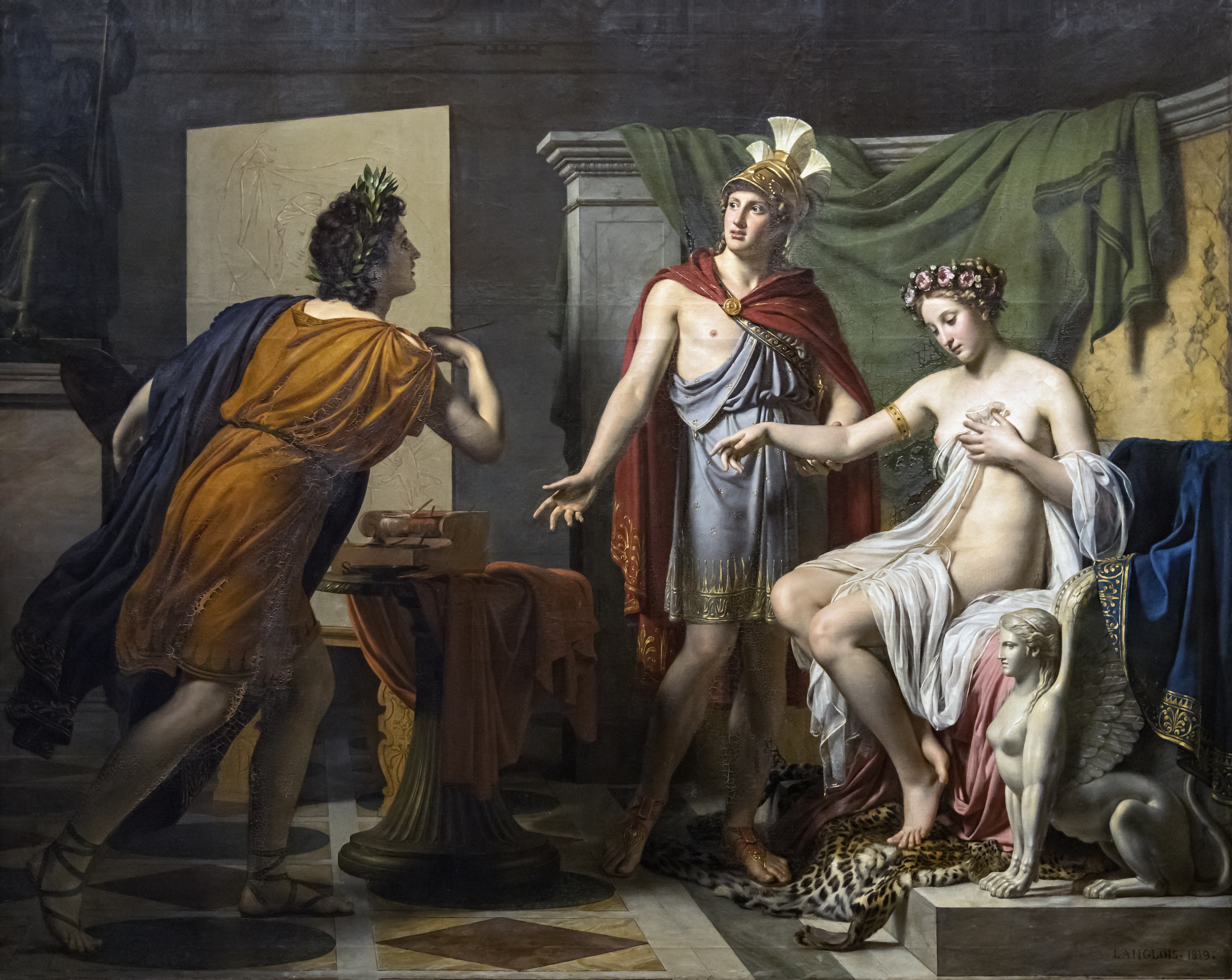
- Artist: Jérôme-Martin Langlois
- Completion date: 1819
- Medium: oil on canvas
- Movement: Neoclassical style
- Subject: Alexander the Great; Campaspe; Apelles
- Dimensions: 287 cm (113 in) x 356.9 cm (140.5 in)
- Location: Musée des Augustins, Toulouse, France

Generosity of Alexander is a neoclassical style, oil-on-canvas painting by the French artist Jérôme-Martin Langlois. The painting was exhibited at the Paris Salon of 1819 and won a first-prize medal. It is currently on display at the Musée des Augustins in Toulouse, France. In the painting, Alexander the Great gives his concubine, Campaspe, as a gift to the painter Apelles when he sees that the painter has fallen in love with her. The painting is a depiction of a well-known and perhaps apocryphal story of Alexander the Great's generosity.

== Description ==
In the painting Apelles is sketching Alexander the Great's mistress Campaspe and has fallen in love with her. Alexander is so appreciative of the painter's skill that he gives him Campaspe. The painter is portrayed as thankful and Campaspe is seen sitting with her feet on a leopard skin, looking down toward the floor.

The dimensions of the painting are 287 cm (113 in) x 356.9 cm (140.5 in). The Neoclassical style painting follows the theme of an unfinished 1813 painting with the same subject matter by Langlois' teacher Jacques-Louis David.

== History ==
The painting won a first-prize medal and was purchased at the Salon of 1819 in Paris. It is in the Musée des Augustins in Toulouse, France, which is currently closed for renovations until 2025.

Langlois also completed a black chalk presentation drawing, sized 39 cm (15 in) x 51.4 cm (20.2 in), in preparation for the painting. It was titled Alexander Ceding Campaspe to Apelles and was exhibited at Zagrelli, Brady & Co. in 1986.
