= Diana and Endymion (Langlois) =

1822 painting by Jérôme-Martin Langlois

- Diane et Endymion (French)
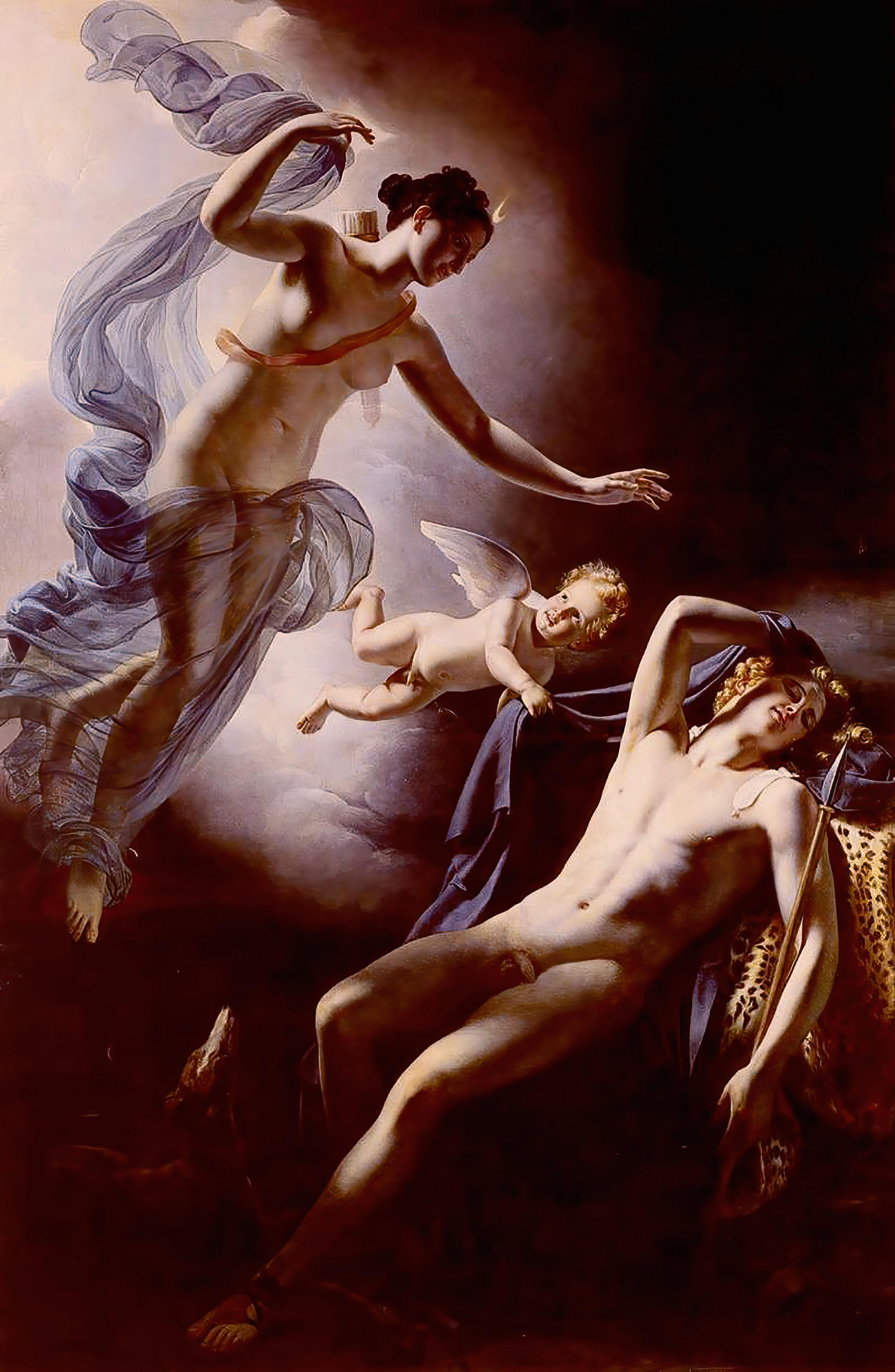
- Artist: Jérôme-Martin Langlois
- Year: 1822
- Medium: Oil-on-canvas
- Movement: Neoclassical style
- Subject: Roman goddess Diana (mythology)
- Dimensions: 320 cm × 211 cm (126 in × 83 in)
- Location: Private collection
- Owner: Possibly Madonna

Diana and Endymion, also known in French as Diane et Endymion, is an 1822 oil-on-canvas painting by Jérôme-Martin Langlois. The painting depicts the Roman goddess Diana, one of the twelve Gods and Goddesses of Olympus, falling in love with Endymion and is painted in the Neoclassical style.

== History ==
The painting is by French artist Jérôme-Martin Langlois. It was displayed to acclaim at the Salon of 1819 and was completed in 1822 having been commissioned by Louis XVIII for his Salon of Diane at the Palace of Versailles. The French Third Republic acquired the work in 1873, and it was displayed at the Musée de Picardie in Amiens from 1878. It was believed that the work was destroyed in the bombing of Amiens in 1918 during World War I. The painting had been part of the collection of the museum that had been evacuated to the Louvre in Paris for safekeeping. The painting was missing from the works that were returned to Amiens from the Louvre after the end of the war. It was initially described as "untraceable since the return of the 1918 removed works" and subsequently as "destroyed by the falling of a bomb on the museum".

An engraving of Langlois's Diana and Endymion was submitted by M. Muller to the French National Institute in 1843.

== Description ==
The painting is painted in the Neoclassical style and it is a depiction of one of the twelve Gods and Goddesses of Olympus: the Roman goddess Diana. She is falling in love with Endymion.

The painting is an oil-on-canvas and its dimensions are 320 cm (130 in) x 211 cm (83 in). In the painting just above a sleeping Endymion is a flying cupid. Suspended in the air above and to the left of cupid is Diana with a quiver on her back. Diana appears to be admiring the sleeping Endymion. Endymion is sleeping with his right arm behind his head. In his left hand he holds a spear. He is resting on a tiger skin and there is a dog lying at his feet.

== Ownership ==
In 1989 at an auction in New York, the American performer Madonna paid $1.3 million (equivalent to $3.4 million in 2025) for a painting believed to be "almost identical" to the missing Diana and Endymion itself, but undated and without Langlois's signature. The painting Madonna purchased is 3 centimetres (1.2 in) smaller than the original and could be either a copy or the original painting with the date and signature removed. It was identified by an art curator from Amiens in the 2015 issue of Paris Match magazine that featured a photograph of Madonna's home.

The Musée de Picardie has subsequently commenced legal action against unknown persons for the painting's theft. Madonna is not connected to the legal action by the city, and the Mayor of Amiens, Brigitte Fouré, does not contest that Madonna acquired the painting legally. Fouré appealed to Madonna to loan the painting to the city in a video in January 2023 so "our local inhabitants can rediscover this work and enjoy it". Amiens is bidding to be the European Capital of Culture in 2028.
