= Nulla dies sine linea =

No day without a single line

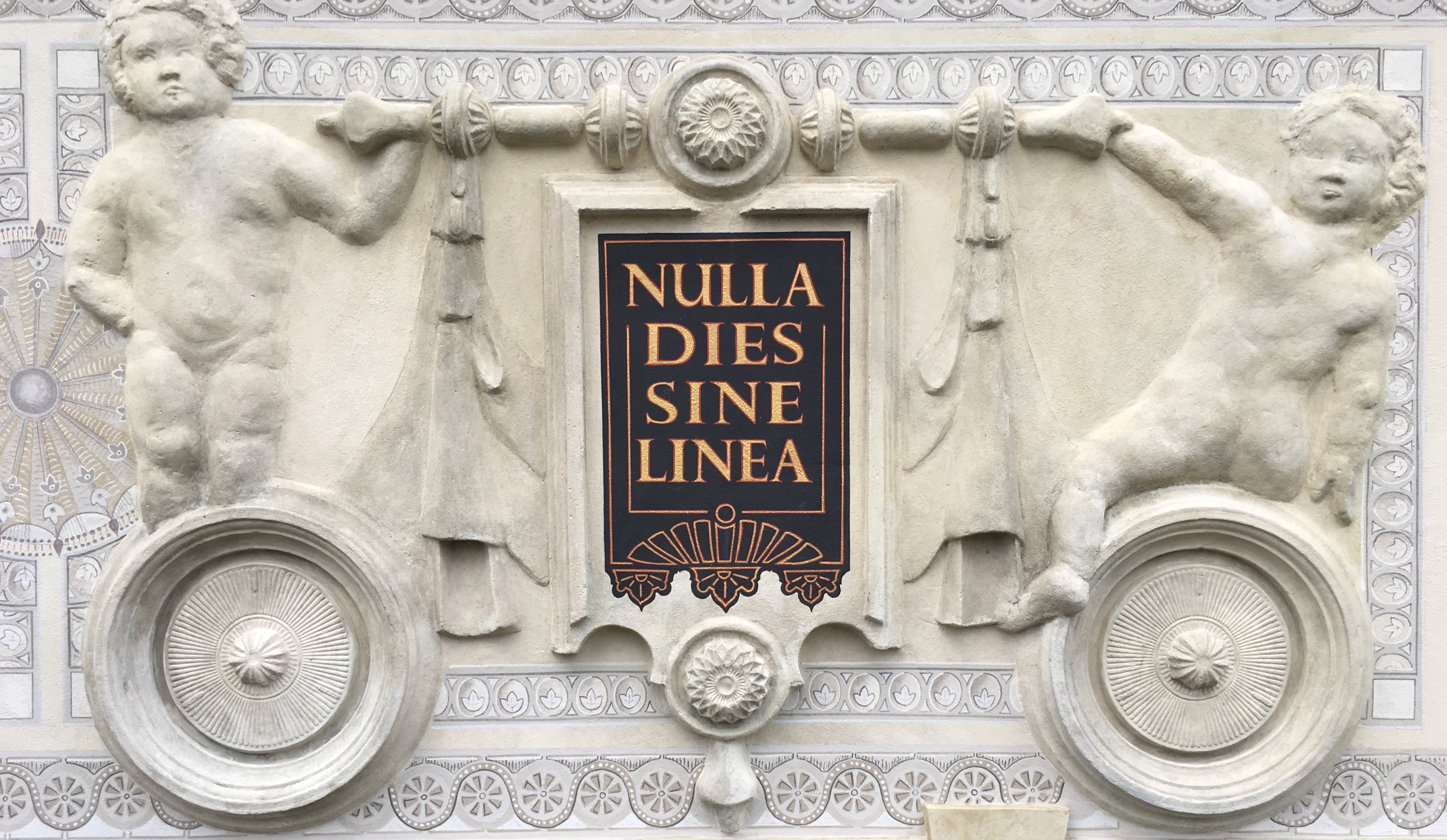
A plaque in Radebeul, Germany

Nulla dies sine linea is a Latin phrase meaning "no day without a line". The idea was originated by Pliny the Elder (Natural History, XXXV, 84), where the idea applies to the Greek painter Apelles, who did not go a day without drawing at least one line. The phrase itself is attested for the first time in the Proverbiorum libellus by Polydore Vergil (1470-1555).

In classical Latin, linea literally means a "linen thread", hence a "line", and figuratively designates a line, drawn with a feather or a brush, but not a line of text. However, many writers have adopted this phrase to mean a line of text.

== Dies: Masculine vs. feminine ==
In principle, the word dies, day, is rather masculine but it is sometimes found in the feminine form, either in traditional expressions like the one presented here, with an almost poetic connotation, or to signify an important day, hence for example the formula dies irae, dies illa, "day of anger that day", in the official text of a Requiem (in the masculine, one would have dies ille ). For an ordinary day, we use the masculine. Even at the beginning of Cicero's "Pro Marcello", we will read dies hodiernus, literally the day today, in the masculine, with a redundancy criticised today but undoubtedly wanted by its author for stylistic reasons, knowing that "today" is translated as hodie, a contraction of hoc die in masculine ablative. So nullus dies was also possible but less emphatic.

== Modern use ==
It was the motto of Ludwig van Beethoven who showed his commitment to writing music and the passionate music that he wrote. The motto was also allegedly a favorite of the English philosopher and founder of modern utilitarianism Jeremy Bentham, for which he was frequently mocked by Karl Marx.

In a small introduction to David Zvi Hoffmann's posthumous seminal work "Melamed LeHoel", his eldest son Moses Judah open with these remarks: "It was a pearl in my father's mouth to say 'Nulla dies sine linea' (Frankfurt am Main, 1925)".

The Spanish Catholic priest, St. Josemaria Escriva, famously used as his motto a line structurally similar to Pliny's phrase: in laetitia, nulla dies sine cruce ("in joy, not a day without the Cross"). This signified the Christian commitment to carry one's cross in imitation of Jesus Christ.

Émile Zola took up this expression and made it a motto, inscribed on the lintel of the fireplace in his office, in his house in Médan. This motto also appears in the office of the Flemish writer Stijn Streuvels, in his house in Ingooigem. Jean-Paul Sartre quotes it in Les Mots: "I am still writing. What else to do? Nulla dies sine linea. It's my habit and then it's my job."

The poet Philippe Léotard ironically used this phrase as the title of one of his autobiographical essays (1992). The Belgian poet Roger Foulon chose it for his ex-libris.

The inaugural exhibition of the "Paul Klee Center" in Bern in 2005 was titled Kein Tag ohne Linie (German equivalent of the Latin expression); this formula, used by Klee himself, refers to the intense production of the artist at the end of his life.

== Bibliography ==
- Oleg Nikitinski, “Zum Ursprung des Spruches nulla dies sine linea ”, Rheinisches Museum, 142, 1999, p. 430-431.
