= Cassandra Imploring the Vengeance of Minerva Against Ajax =

1810 painting by Jérôme-Martin Langlois

Cassandra Imploring The Vengeance of Minerva Against Ajax
- Cassandre implorant la vengeance de Minerve contre Ajax (French)
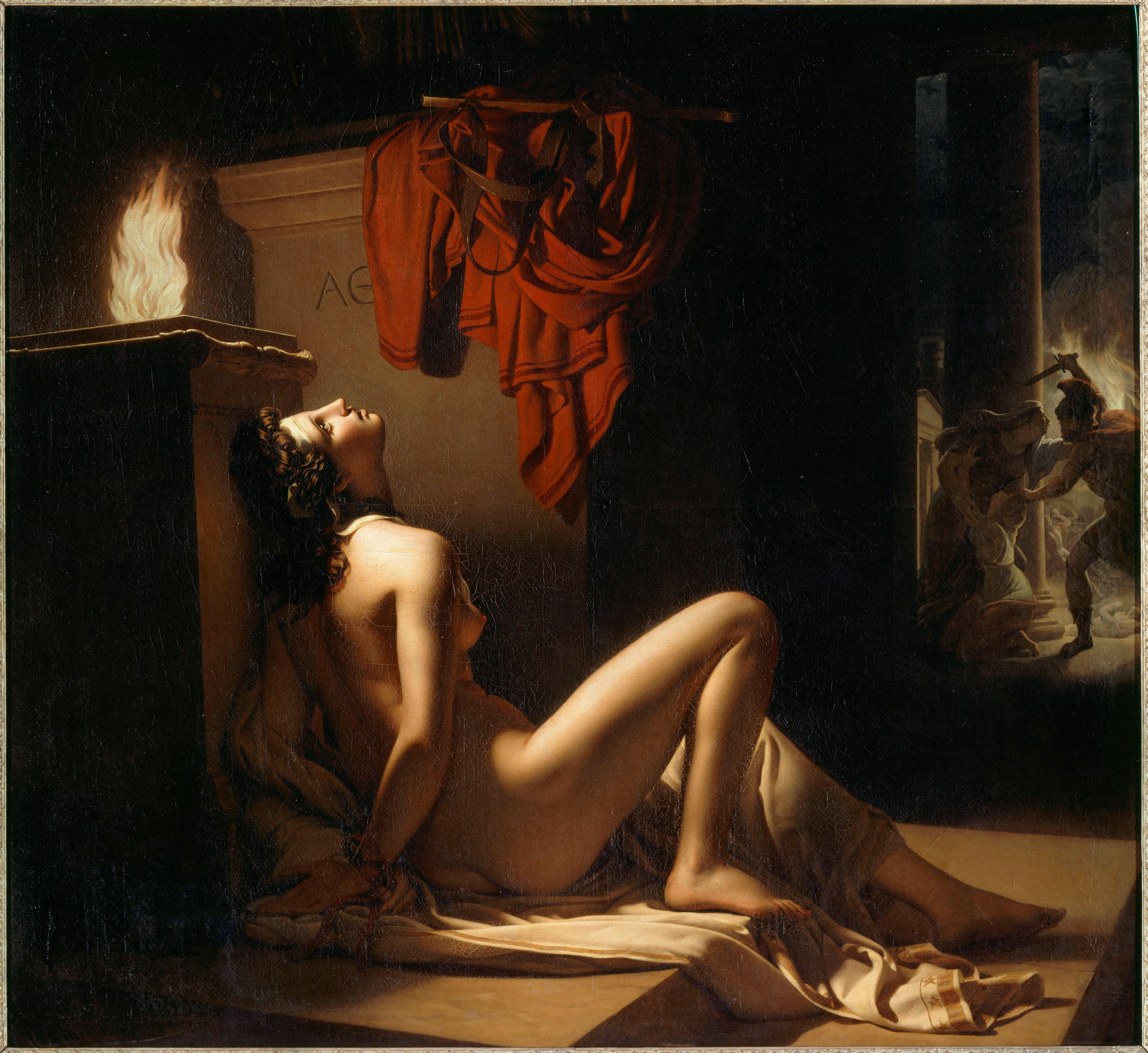
- Artist: Jérôme-Martin Langlois
- Year: 1810
- Medium: oil on canvas
- Movement: Neoclassical style
- Subject: Cassandra and Athena
- Dimensions: 180.9 cm (71.2 in) x 193 cm (76 in)
- Location: Musée des beaux-arts de Chambéry, Savoie

Cassandra Imploring The Vengeance of Minerva Against Ajax or French Cassandre implorant la vengeance de Minerve contre Ajax is an oil-on-canvas painting created in 1810 by the French Neoclassical painter Jérôme-Martin Langlois.

== History ==
Langlois painted Cassandre implorant la vengeance de Minerve contre Ajax in 1810. The painting was exhibited at the 1817 Salon (Paris) and earned a second-class medal there. Louis XVIII bought the painting after the salon.

== Description ==
The painting depicts Cassandra, having been raped by Ajax the Lesser, looking to the heavens and seeking revenge. The setting is the fall of Troy and Cassandra is seated in the temple of Minerva. Her hands are behind her back and she leans on the altar. In the background, Troy can be seen in flames, and a woman can be seen struggling with a soldier.

== Legacy ==
An image of the painting appears on the cover Emily Pillinger's 2019 book, Cassandra and the poetics of prophecy in Greek and Latin literature.
