= Alfred Woltmann =

German art historian (1841-1880)

Alfred Woltmann (18 May 1841 – 6 February 1880) was a German art historian. He was born at Charlottenburg, studied at Berlin and Munich, and was appointed professor of art history successively at the Karlsruhe Polytechnicum (1868) and at the universities of Prague (1874) and Strasbourg (1878). Conjointly with the author he adapted the fifth volume of Schnaase's Geschichte der bildenden Künste for the second edition (1872), and with Karl Woermann began a Geschichte der Malerei (1878), completed after his death by his collaborator. Besides his principal work, Holbein und seine Zeit (second edition, 1873–76), he wrote:

- Die deutsche Kunst und Die Reformation (second edition, 1871)
- Die Baugeschichte Berlins (1872)
- Geschichte der deutschen Kunst in Elsass (1876)
- Die deutsche Kunst in Prag (1877)
- Aus vier Jahrhunderten niederländischdeutscher Kunstgeschichte (1878)
