= Karl Woermann =

German art historian and museum director (1844–1933)

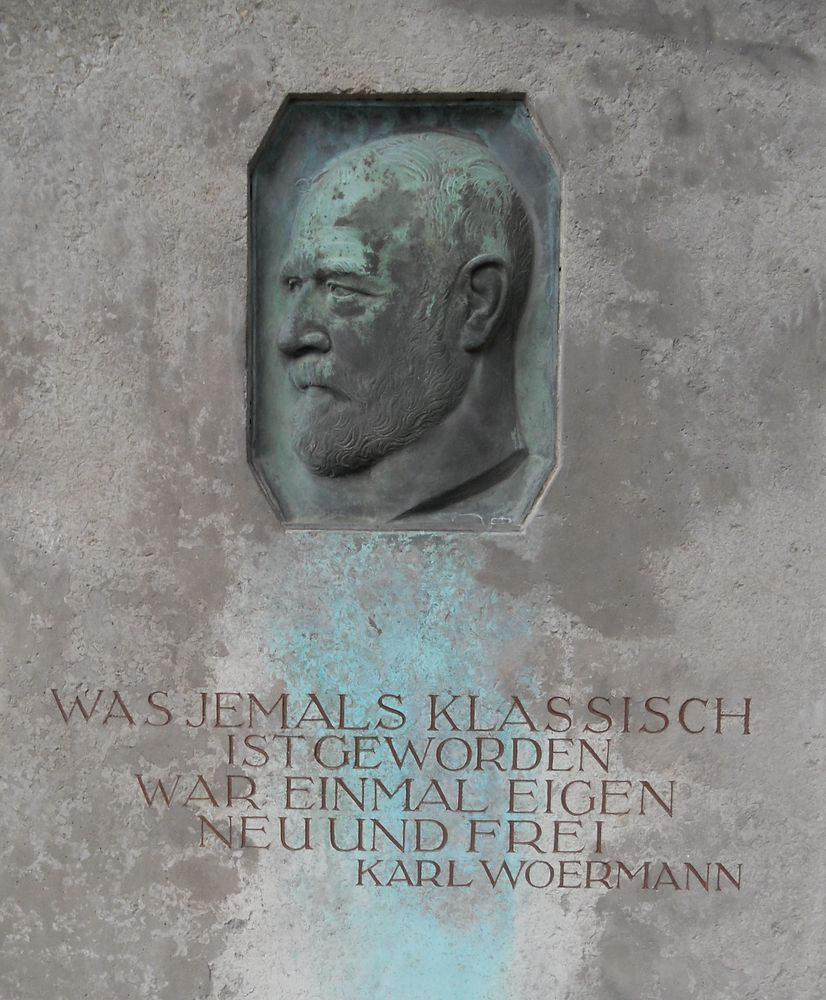
Grave relief of Woermann at the Urnenhain Tolkewitz in Dresden

Karl Woermann (4 July 1844 – 4 February 1933) was a German art historian and museum director.

== Biography ==
He was born in Hamburg, studied at various universities (art history at Heidelberg and Munich), and traveled widely. In 1871 Woermann participated in the so-called "Holbein convention" in Dresden, at which a number of prominent art historians convened to determine which of two versions of Hans Holbein the Younger's "Meyer Madonna" was the original work. He was called to the academy at Düsseldorf in 1874 as professor of the history of art and literature. In 1882 he became director of the picture gallery Gemäldegalerie Alte Meister at Dresden, for which he wrote the first scientific catalogue (1887). To the Geschichte der Malerei, begun by Alfred Woltmann, he contributed the part on antique painting, and after Woltmann's death completed the entire work. His work unites sound scholarship with sympathetic appreciation, and displays a generous attitude towards the research of others.

== Published works ==
He wrote, besides several series of poems, works including:

- Die Landschaft in der Kunst der alten Völker (1876)
- Die antiken Odysseelandschaften vom Equilinischen Hügel in Rom (1877)
- Kunst- und Naturskizzen aus Nord- und Südeuropa (1880)
- Was uns die Kunstgeschichte lehrt (fourth edition, 1894)
- Geschichte der Kunst aller Zeiten und Völker (three volumes, 1900–05)
