= Asclepiodorus (painter) =

4th-century BC Greek painter

Asclepiodorus of Athens (/əˌskliːpioʊˈdɔːrəs/; Ancient Greek: Ἀσκληπιόδωρος) was a painter, contemporary of Apelles, who considered him to excel himself in the symmetry and correctness of his drawing. Plutarch ranks him with Euphranor and Nicias.
