= Apelles Painting Campaspe in the Presence of Alexander the Great =

Painting by Jacques-Louis David

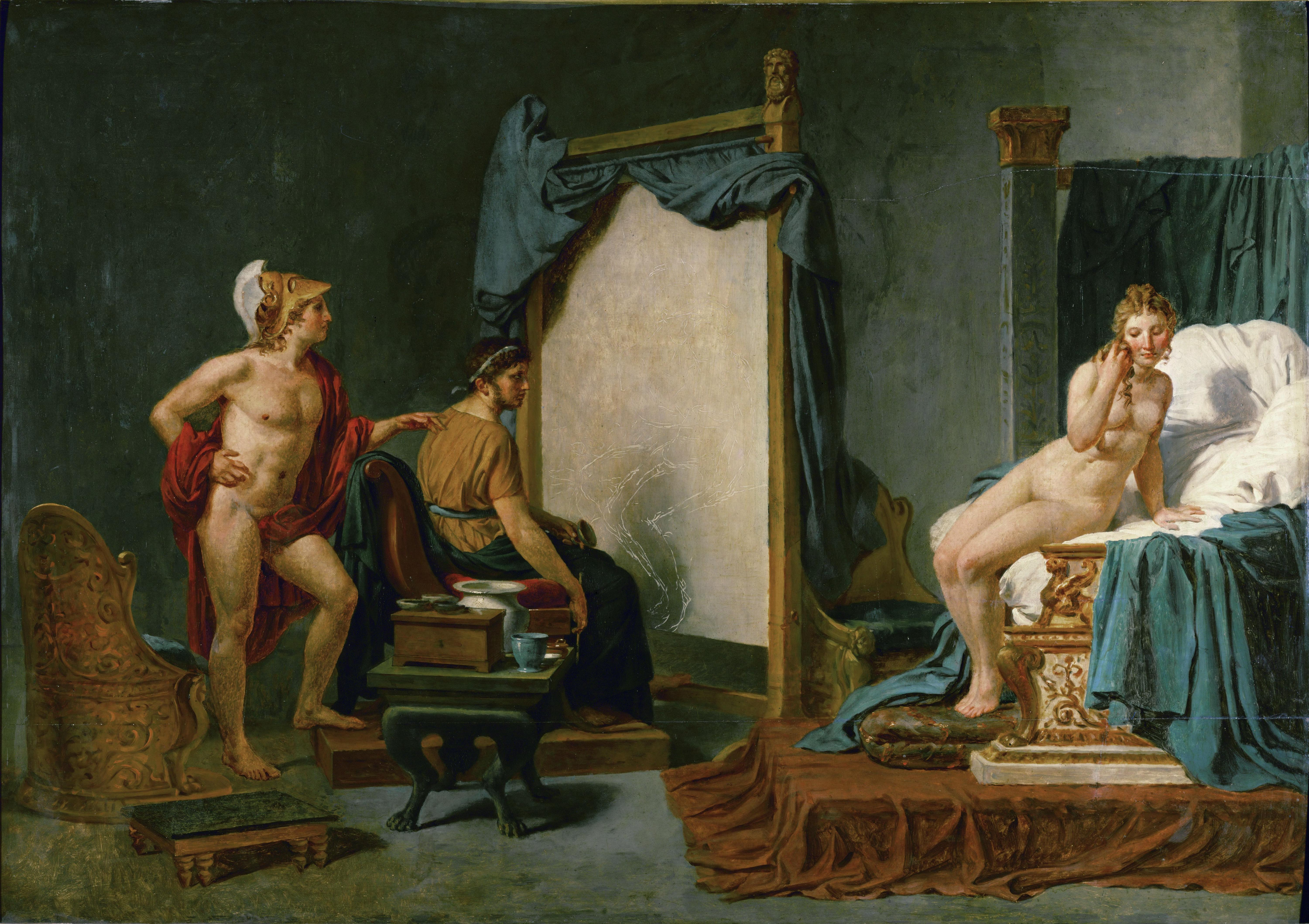
- Artist: Jacques-Louis David
- Year: c.1814
- Type: Oil on canvas, history painting
- Dimensions: 96.5 cm × 136.2 cm (38.0 in × 53.6 in)
- Location: Palais des Beaux-Arts; Lille

Apelles Painting Campaspe in the Presence of Alexander the Great (French: Apelle peignant Campaspe en présence d'Alexandre is a c.1814 history painting by the French artist Jacques-Louis David. Based on a story by Pliny the Elder, if depicts the artist Apelles working on a painting of Alexander the Great and his mistress Campaspe. Alexander has just taken a break from posing to examine the protests of the painting.

Neoclassical in style, it differed sharply from the preliminary sketch. Some sources date the painting significantly later, around 1819, by which time David was living in exile in Brussels following the Bourbon Restoration.

Today the painting is in the collection of the Palais des Beaux-Arts in Lille.

== Bibliography ==
- Bryson, Norman. Hersilia's Sisters: Jacques-Louis David, Women, and the Emergence of Civil Society in Post-Revolution France.
- Crow, Thomas. Restoration: The Fall of Napoleon in the Course of European Art, 1812-1820. Princeton University Press, 2023.
- Moore, Kenneth Royce (ed.) Brill's Companion to the Reception of Alexander the Great. Brill, 2018.
