= Jérôme-Martin Langlois =

French painter (1779–1838)

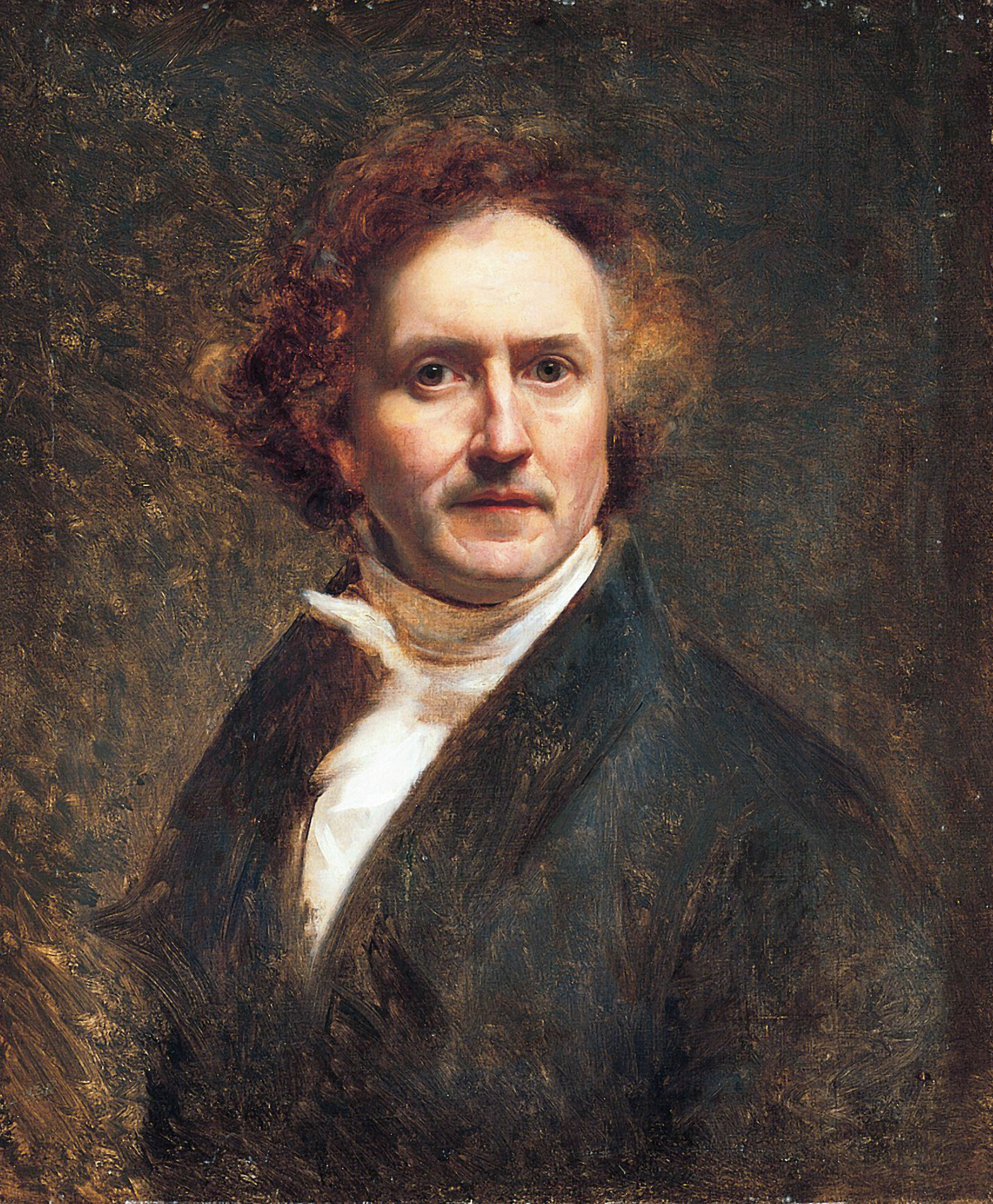
- Jérôme-Martin Langlois c. 1830 self portrait
- Born: 1 March 1779; Paris, France
- Died: 28 December 1838 (aged 59); Paris, France
- Known for: Painting
- Notable work: Générosité d'Alexandre
- Movement: Neoclassical style
- Father: Jerome Langlois

Jerome-Martin Langlois (11 March 1779 – 28 December 1838) was a French Neoclassical style painter. He was trained by painter Jacques-Louis David and he was a Knight of the Legion of Honour.

== Early life ==
He was born in Paris on 11 March 1779. His father (Jerome Langlois) was a miniature painter. He received his training in the studio of Jacques-Louis David, (the leading Neoclassical French painter) and became one of his favorite students. The two artists worked together on several important paintings, including Napoleon crossing the Alps (now at the Kunsthistorisches Museum in Vienna), in which Langlois painted the horse, and Leonidas at Thermopylae (Musee du Louvre, Paris).

== Career ==
Langlois won the second prize at the Prix de Rome in 1805 and the first prize in 1809, moving to Rome in the 1810s. A preparatory drawing of the painting that granted him the first place (Priam aux pieds d'Achilles) is in the collection of the Musee Magnin in Dijon, France. Since 1806 he regularly exhibited at the Salon until 1837, winning the second prize in 1817 and first prize in 1819. Langlois's Diana and Endymion of 1822 was commissioned by Louis XVIII for his Salon of Diane at the Palace of Versailles. It was displayed at the Musée de Picardie from 1878 and has been missing since World War I. It may be in the private collection of the American performer Madonna. In 1824 he was in Brussels, where he painted the portrait of Jacques-Louis David, which was exhibited in 1831.

== Honors ==
In 1817 his painting Cassandra Imploring the Vengeance of Minerva Against Ajax was exhibited at the Paris Salon of 1817 and earned a second-class medal. In 1819 his painting the Générosité d'Alexandre was exhibited at the Salon of 1819 and won a first-prize medal. In 1822, he became a Knight of the Legion of Honour.

== Gallery ==
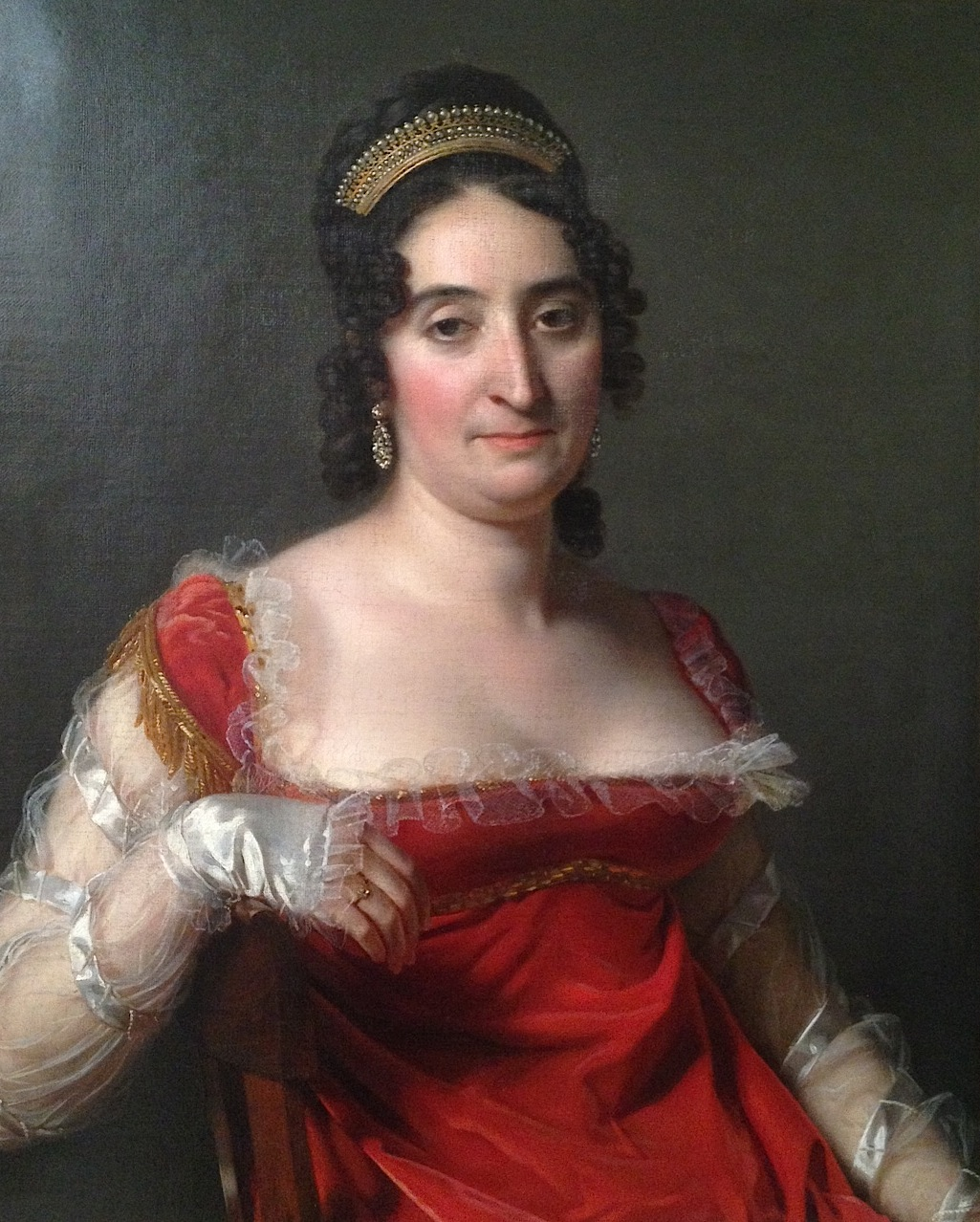
Lady in red wearing a tiara (Private collection)

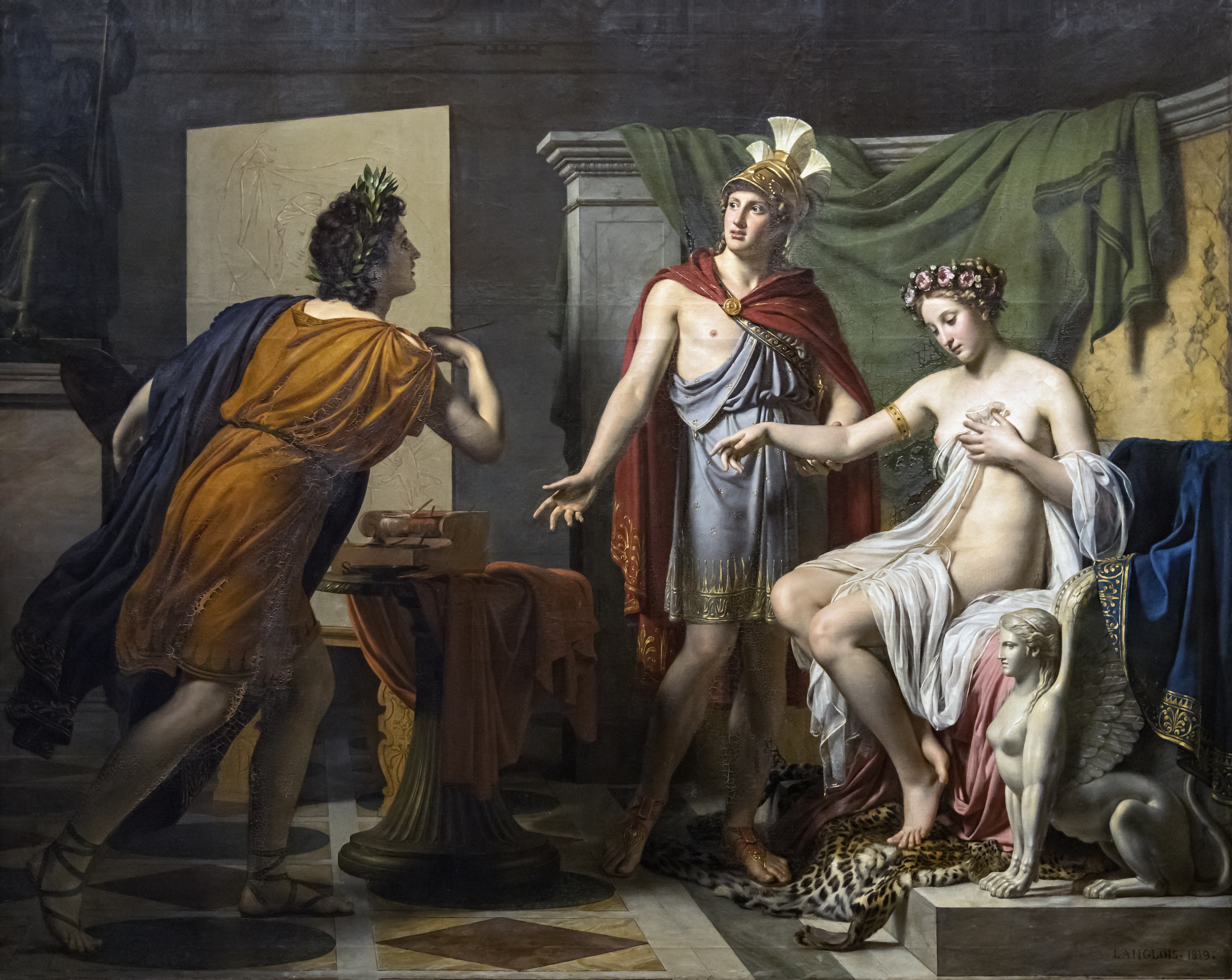
Générosité d'Alexandre, Musée des Augustins, Toulouse

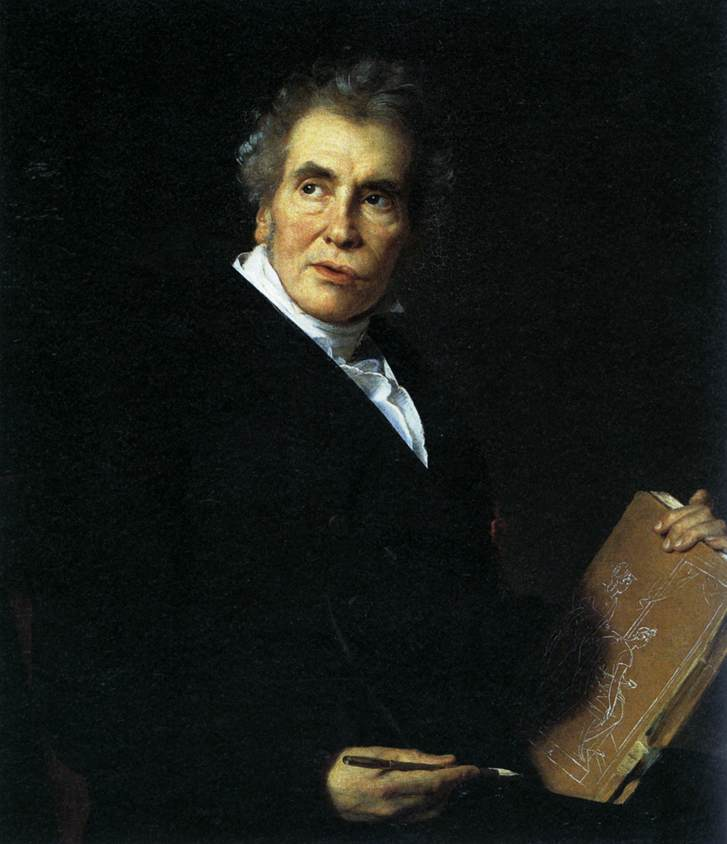
Portrait of Jacques-Louis David

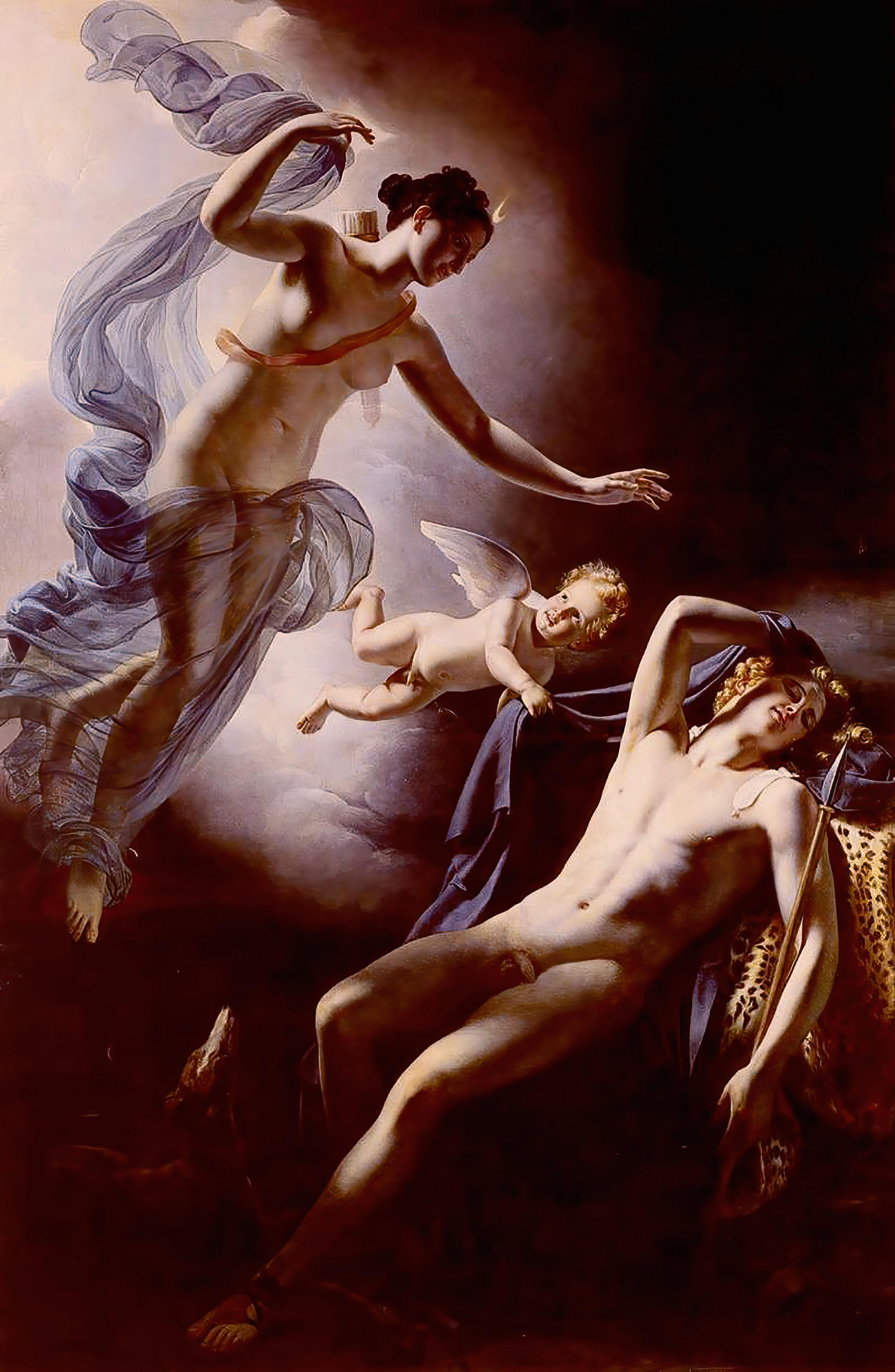
Diana and Endymion (Private collection)

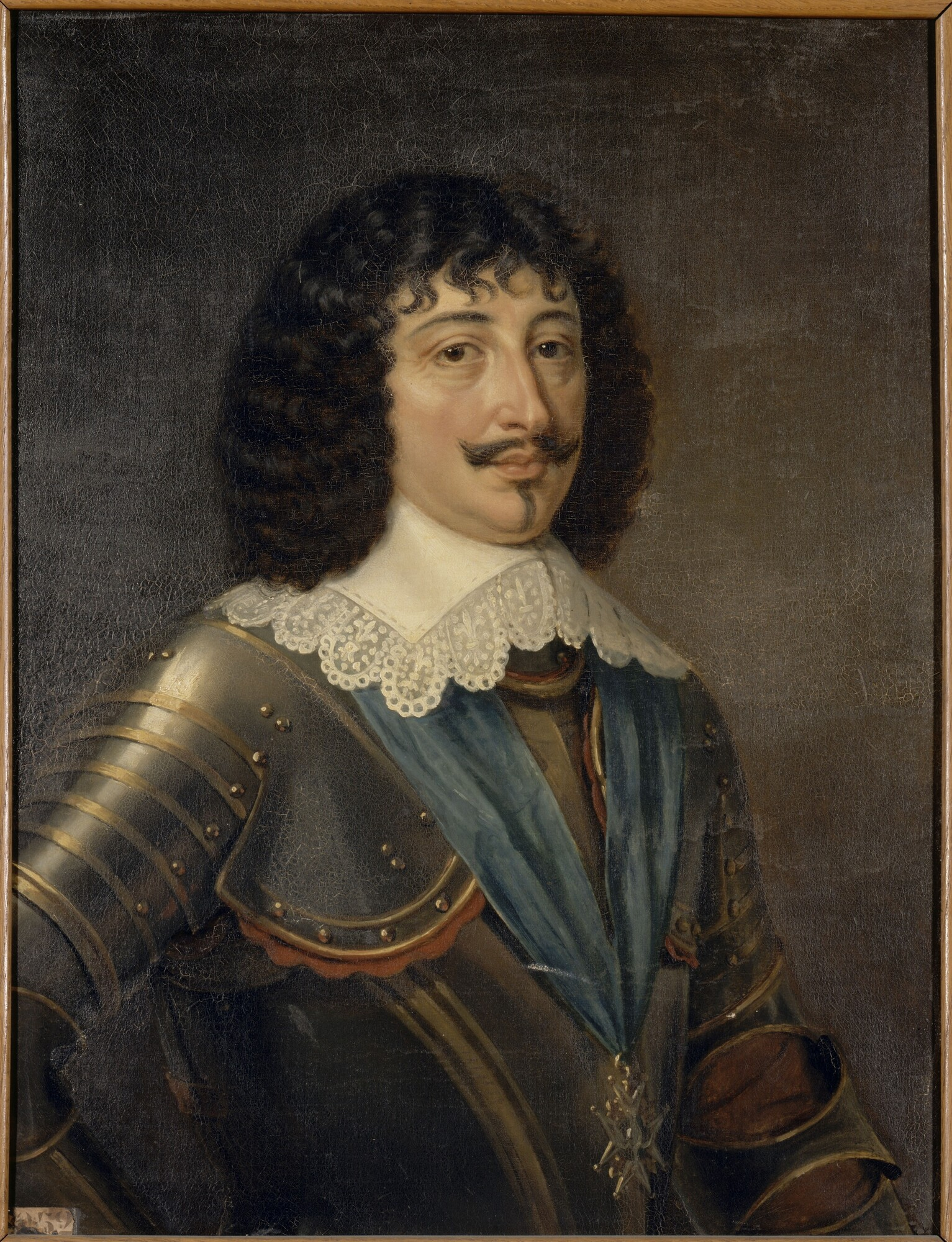
Urbain de Maillé, marquis de Brézé

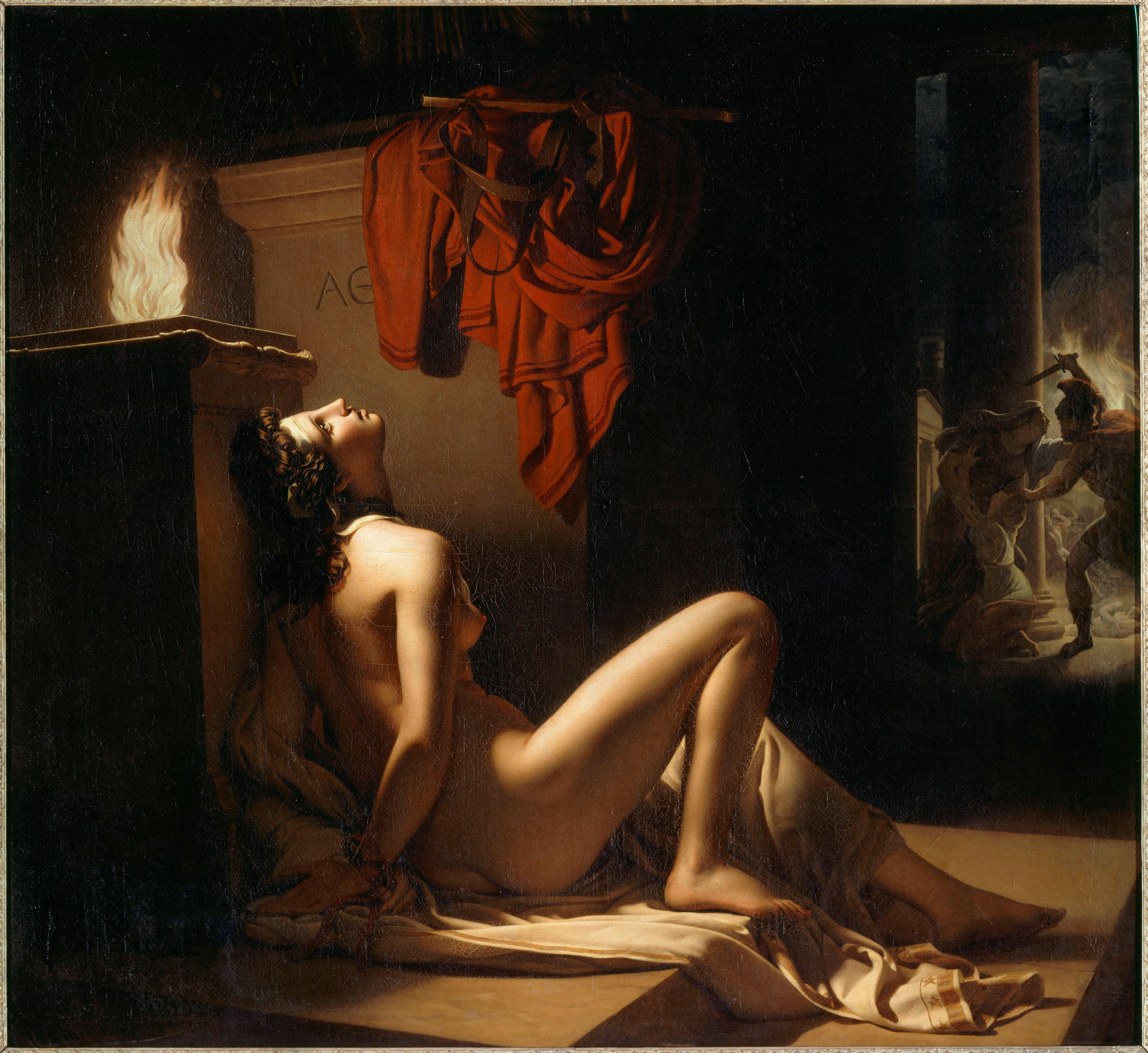
Cassandra Imploring the Vengeance of Minerva Against Ajax
