= 1822 in art =

Events in the year 1822 in Art.

== Events ==
- 24 April – Salon of 1822 opens at the Louvre in Paris
- 6 May – Royal Academy Exhibition of 1822 opens at Somerset House in London
- Nicéphore Niépce creates the first permanent photograph through his heliographic process.
- The Mauritshuis in The Hague opens to the public as a state art museum.
- Henry Raeburn is knighted and appointed royal limner.

== Paintings ==
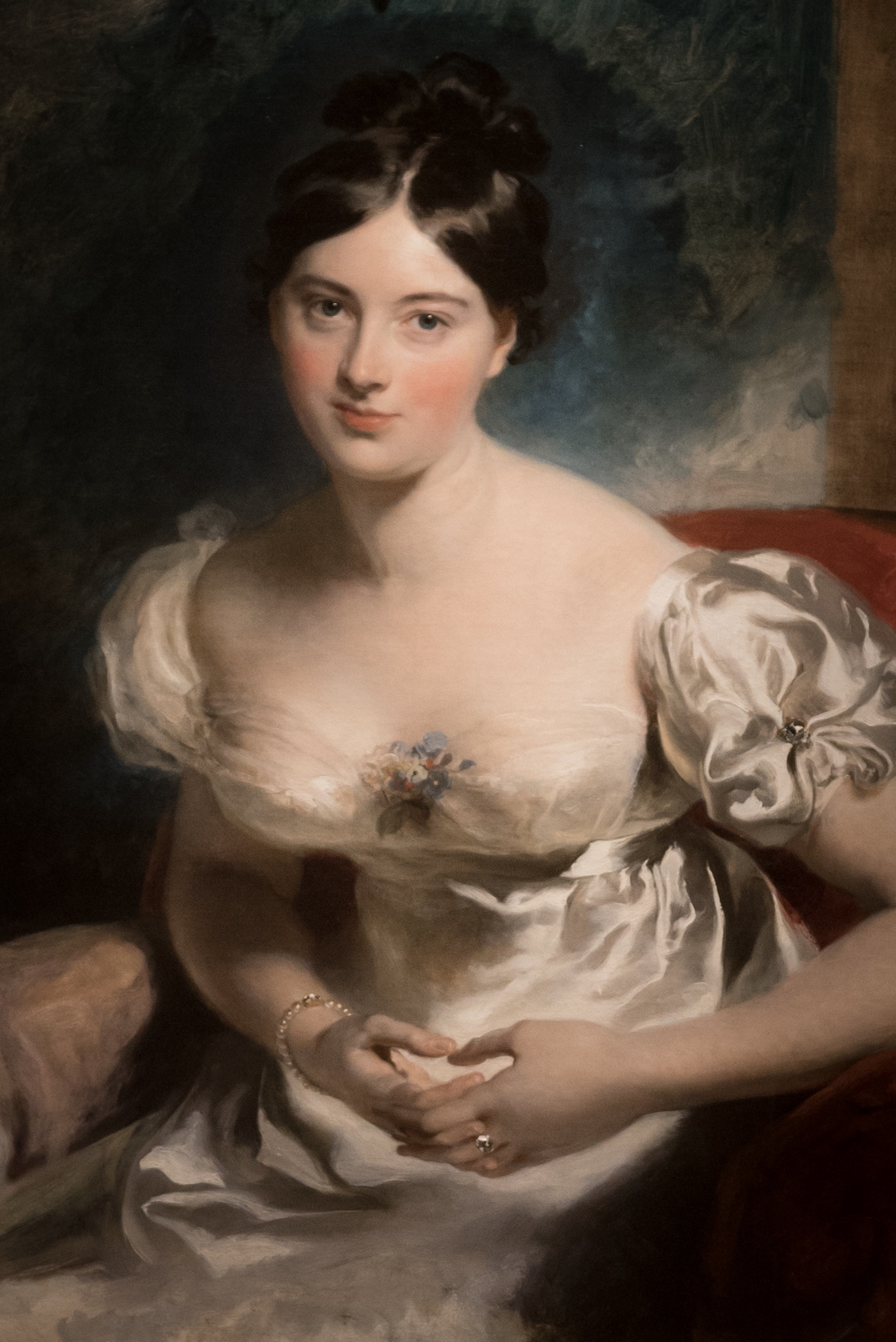
Lawrence – Portrait of the Countess of Blessington (Wallace Collection, London)

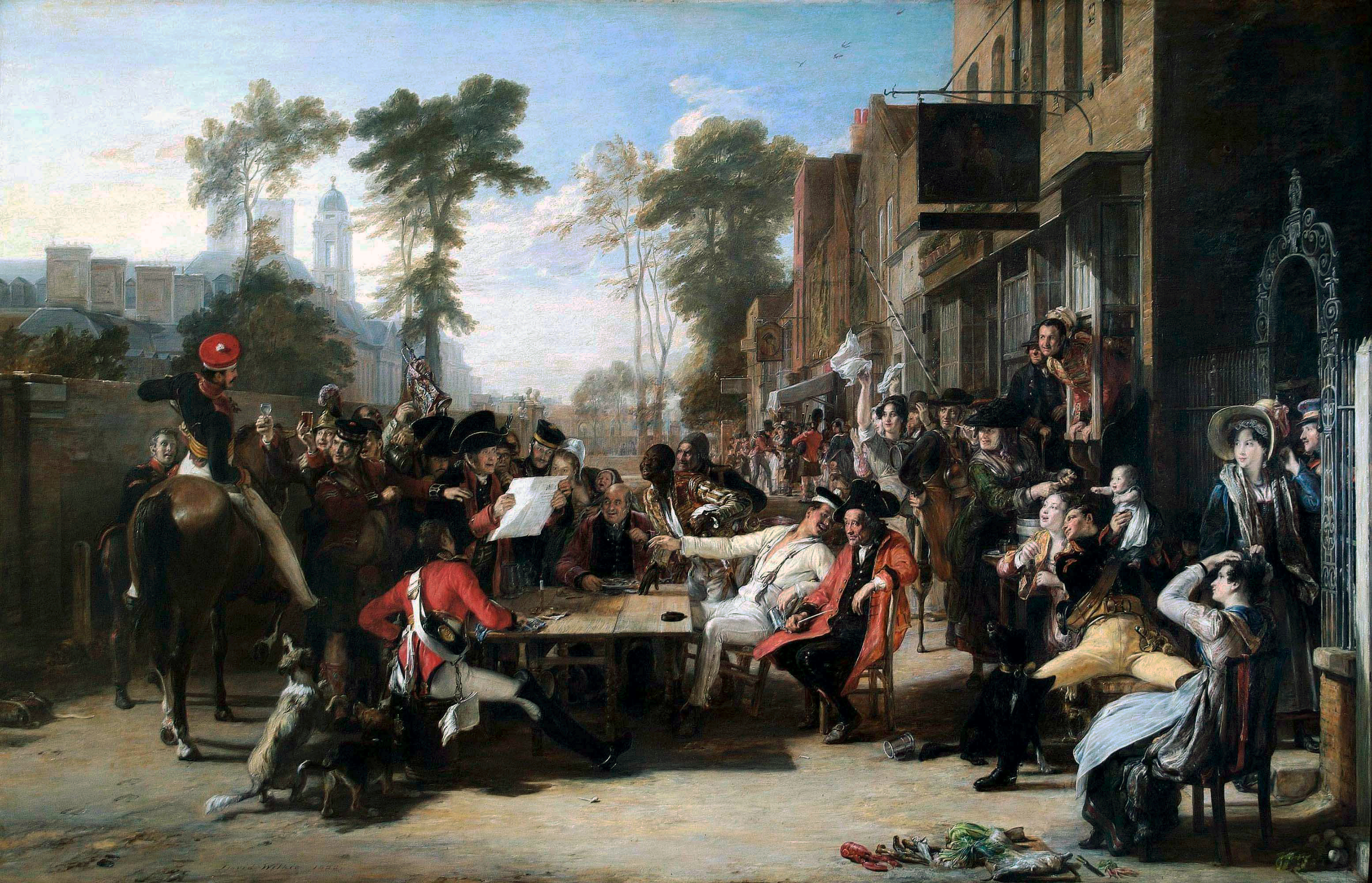
Wilkie – The Chelsea Pensioners reading the Waterloo Dispatch

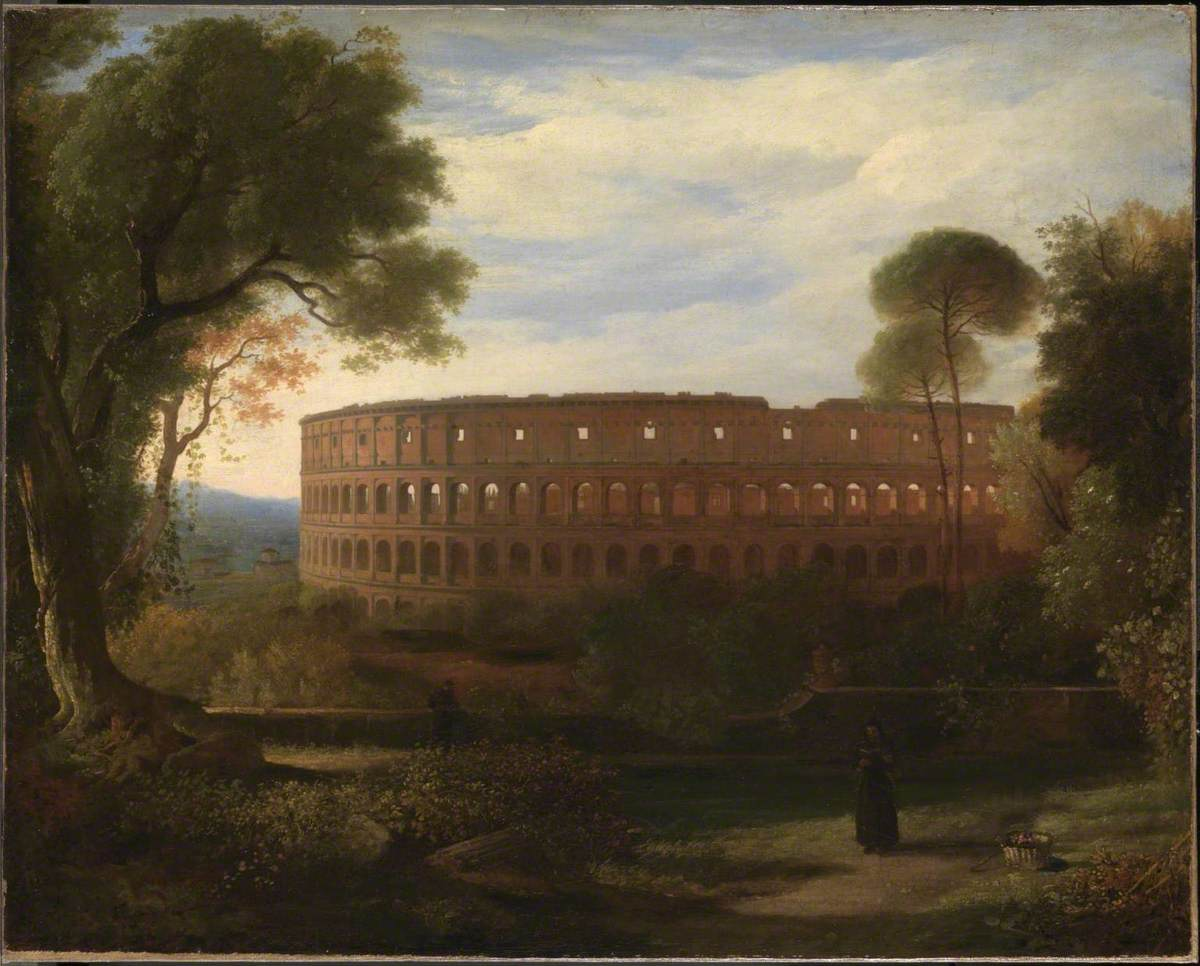
Eastlake – The Colosseum from the Esquiline.

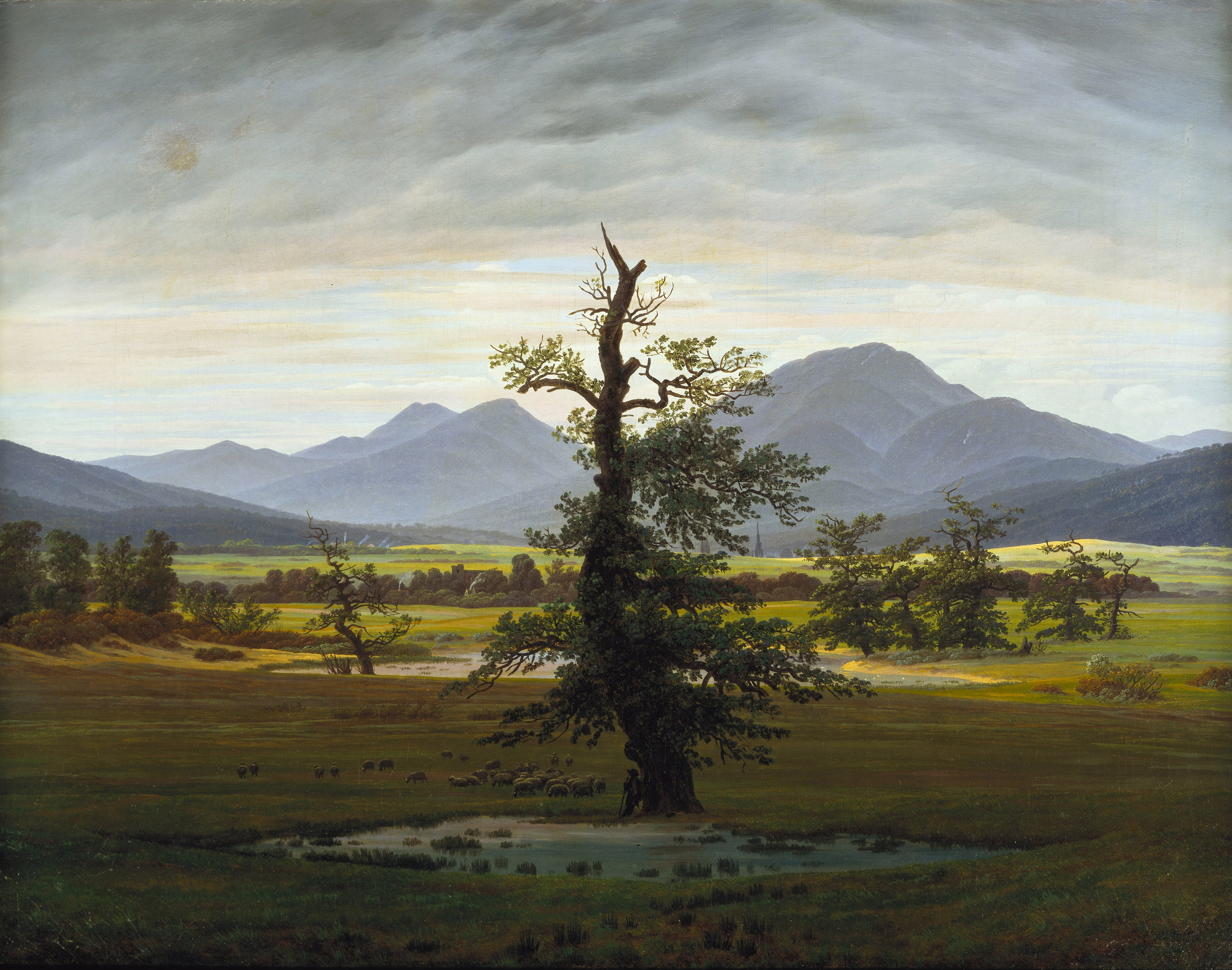
Friedrich – The Lonely Tree.

- Louis-Léopold Boilly
  - Distribution of Wine and Food on the Champs-Elysées
  - Moving Day
- Augustus Wall Callcott – Smugglers Alarmed
- Alexander Carse – George IV Landing at Leith
- John Constable
  - The Grove, Hampstead
  - Hampstead Heath, with a Bonfire
  - Road to the Spaniards, Hampstead
  - View of Lower Terrace, Hampstead
  - View on the Stour near Dedham
  - Yarmouth Jetty
- Francis Danby – View of the Avon Gorge
- Eugène Delacroix – The Barque of Dante (first major work)
- John Doyle – The Life of a Racehorse (prints)
- Charles Lock Eastlake
  - The Colosseum from the Campo Vaccino
  - The Colosseum from the Esquiline
- William Etty – Youth on the Prow, and Pleasure at the Helm (first version)
- Caspar David Friedrich
  - The Lonely Tree
  - Moonrise by the Sea
  - The Tree of Crows
- François Gérard – The Duchess of Berry and Her Children
- Théodore Géricault – portraits of insane inmates of the Salpêtrière Hospital in Paris made for the psychiatrist Étienne-Jean Georget.
  - Insane Woman
  - Portrait of a Kleptomaniac
- Jean-Baptiste Paulin Guérin – Anchises and Venus
- Louis Hersent – Ruth
- George Jones
  - The Banquet at the Coronation of George IV
  - The Battle of Vittoria
- Orest Kiprensky – Portrait of Ekaterina Avdulina
- Jérôme-Martin Langlois - Diana and Endymion
- Thomas Lawrence
  - Portrait of the Countess of Blessington
  - Portrait of George IV
- Louis-François Lejeune – The Battle of Moscow
- Guillaume Guillon-Lethière - The Oath of the Ancestors
- John Martin – The Destruction of Pompeii and Herculaneum
- Charles Meynier – Alexander the Great Giving Campaspe to Apelles
- Samuel Morse – The House of Representatives
- James Northcote – Portrait of John Ruskin
- Charles Willson Peale – The Artist in His Museum
- Pierre Paul Prud'hon – Crucifixion
- Pierre Révoil – Mary, Queen of Scots, Separated from Her Followers
- Edward Villiers Rippingille – The Recruiting Party
- Antoine Jean-Baptiste Thomas – Procession of Saint Januarius During an Eruption of Vesuvius
- J.M.W. Turner – George IV at St Giles's, Edinburgh
- John Trumbull – Surrender of General Burgoyne
- Horace Vernet
  - The Battle of Montmirail
  - Joseph Vernet Tied to a Mast During a Storm
- David Wilkie – The Chelsea Pensioners reading the Waterloo Dispatch

== Sculpture ==
- Edward Hodges Baily – Eve at the Fountain (marble)
- Lorenzo Bartolini – The Campbell Sisters dancing a Waltz (marble)
- Richard Westmacott – statue of Achilles (Wellington Monument, London)

== Births ==
- February 16 – Herman Frederik Carel ten Kate, Dutch watercolorist (died 1891)
- March 16 – Rosa Bonheur, French animal painter (died 1899)
- May 18? – Mathew Brady, American photographer (died 1896)
- June 1 – Clementina Maude, Viscountess Hawarden, née Clementina Elphinstone Fleeming, British portrait photographer (died 1865)
- August 27 – Theodor Martens, German painter (died 1884)
- October 7 – Francis Frith, English topographical photographer (died 1898)

== Deaths ==
- January 14 – Franz Kobell, German painter, etcher and draftsman (born 1749)
- January 22 – Rudolph Schadow, German sculptor (born 1786)
- February 11 – Arthur William Devis, English painter of history paintings and portraits (born 1762)
- March 23 – Charles Clément Balvay, French engraver mainly working in intaglio and exclusively in burin (born 1756)
- April 3 – Friedrich Justin Bertuch, German patron of the arts (born 1747)
- April 17 – Dmitry Levitzky, Russian-Ukrainian portrait painter (born 1735)
- May 6 – Charles Peale Polk, American portrait painter (born 1767)
- May 11 – Gerard van Spaendonck, Dutch painter (born 1746)
- May 19 (bur.) – Daniel Havell, English engraver (born 1785)
- September 10 – Antoine Cardon, also known as Cardon the Elder, Belgian painter, portraitist and engraver (born 1739)
- September 24 – Achille Etna Michallon, French landscape painter (born 1796)
- October 9 – Richard Earlom, English engraver (born 1742)
- October 13 – Antonio Canova, Italian sculptor (born 1757)
- October 25 – James Sowerby, English naturalist and illustrator (born 1757)
- November 17 – Joaquim Machado de Castro, Portuguese sculptor (born 1731)
- December 10 – Bertrand Andrieu, French engraver and medalist (born 1761)
- December 28 – Albert Christoph Dies, German painter and composer (born 1755)
- date unknown
  - Pierre Audouin, French engraver (born 1768)
  - Kim Deuk-sin, Korean painter, official painter of the Joseon court (born 1754)
  - Nathaniel Plimer, English miniaturist (born 1757)
  - Mariano Ramón Sánchez, Spanish painter primarily of portrait miniatures (born 1740)
