= Kensington Gore =

Thoroughfare on the south side of Hyde Park in central London

Coordinates: 51°30′5.6″N 0°10′45.4″W

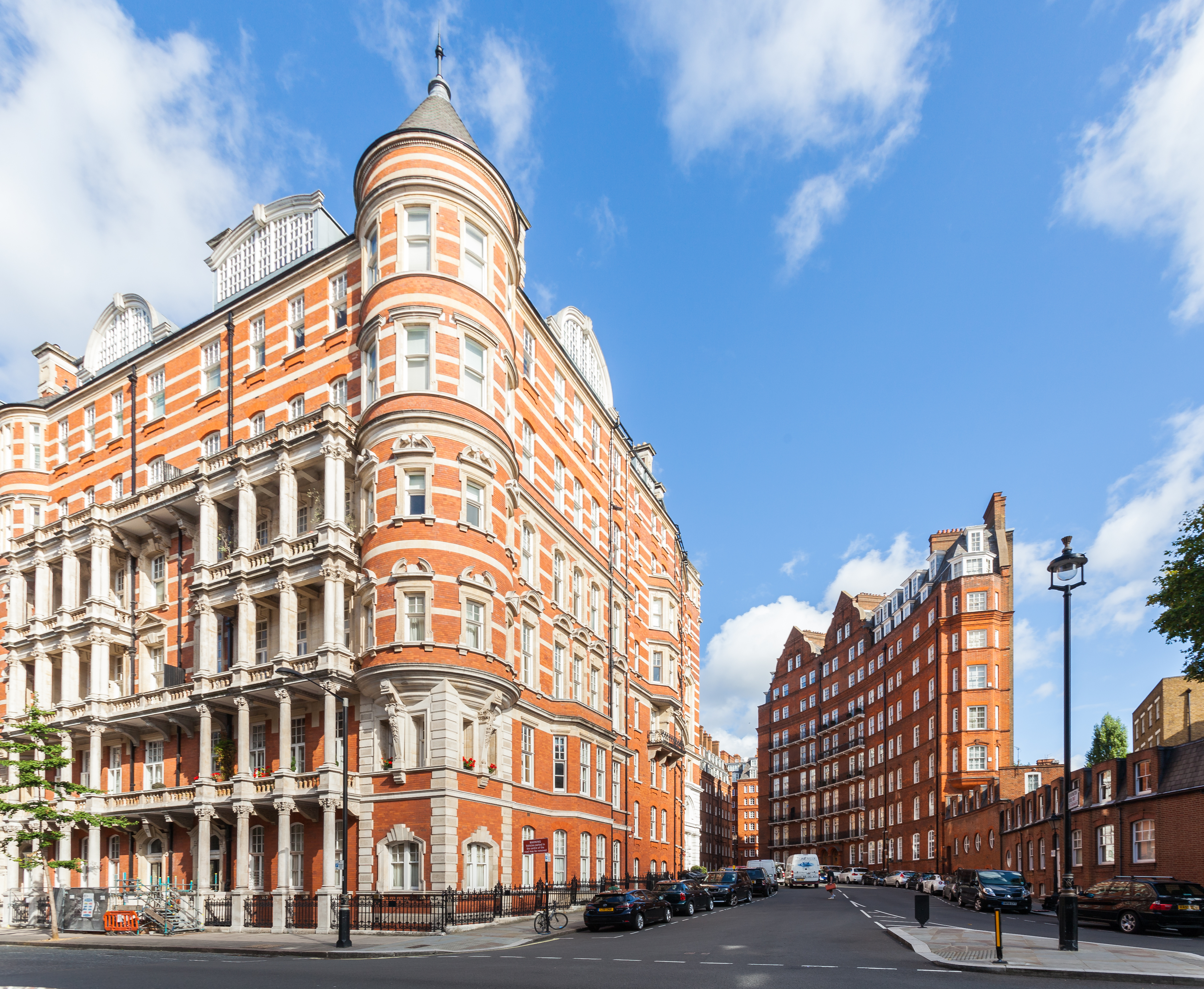
The east end of Kensington Gore from Prince Consort Road.

Kensington Gore is the name of a U-shaped thoroughfare on the south side of Hyde Park in the City of Westminster, England. The streets connect the Royal Albert Hall with the Royal College of Art, the Royal Geographical Society, and in Kensington Gardens the Albert Memorial. The area is named after the Gore estate which occupied the site until it was developed by Victorian planners in the mid 19th century. A gore is a narrow, triangular piece of land.

the wedge-shaped piece of land which divides them, and which has been known from Anglo-Saxon times as The Gore.

— London Topographical Record, volume 3, pp. 23-4

The street replaces part of Kensington Road, connecting what would otherwise be two separate streets.

== History ==
Gore House was the residence of political reformer William Wilberforce between 1808 and 1821. The three-acre (12,000 m^{2}) estate was subsequently occupied by the Countess of Blessington and the Count D'Orsay from 1836 to 1849. The Countess and Count are minor characters in Zadie Smith's 2023 novel The Fraud, in which Gore House is a setting for several important scenes.

In May 1851, the house opened as a restaurant by the chef Alexis Soyer, who planned to cater for the 1851 Great Exhibition in Hyde Park. After the exhibition and on the advice of Prince Albert, Gore House and its grounds were bought by the Exhibition's Royal Commission to create the cultural quarter known as Albertopolis. In 1871, the Royal Albert Hall was completed on the site of the former house. It was opened by Queen Victoria in 1892, The Gore Hotel was opened by sisters Miss Ada and Ms Cooke, who it has been said were descendants of Captain James Cook. However, they cannot have been as none of Captain Cook's children had any children of their own. The 50-bedroom luxury hotel has featured in many music videos and photo shoots, such as for Beggars Banquet by The Rolling Stones.

The streets are bounded to the north by Kensington Road (the A315). The nearest tube station is South Kensington to the south.
