= Portrait of Mikhail Vorontsov =

1821 painting by Thomas Lawrence

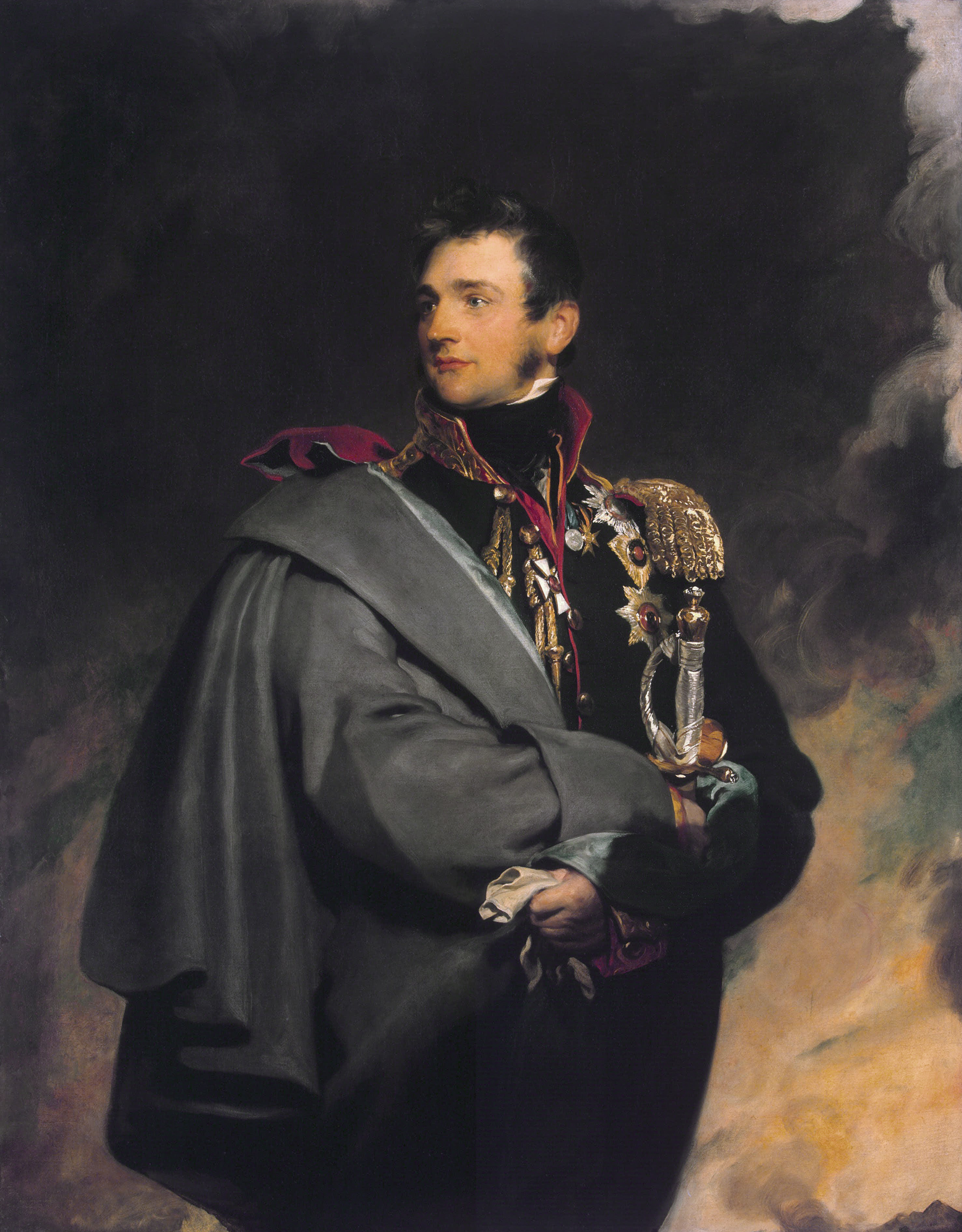
- Artist: Thomas Lawrence
- Year: 1821
- Type: Oil on canvas, portrait
- Dimensions: 130 cm × 102 cm (50 in × 40.1 in)
- Location: Hermitage Museum, Saint Petersburg

Portrait of Mikhail Vorontsov is an oil on canvas portrait painting by the British artist Sir Thomas Lawrence of the Russian general Mikhail Semyonovich Vorontsov, from 1821.

== History and description ==
The son of Semyon Vorontsov, the Russian Ambassador to Britain, he spent much of his youth in England. He distinguished himself fighting in the Napoleonic Wars. He was later in charge of the Russian contingent during the Allied Occupation of France from 1815 to 1818 under the overall command of the Duke of Wellington. He was subsequently Governor of New Russia on the Black Sea.

It was painted while he was on a visit to England where he stayed with his sister Catherine Herbert, Countess of Pembroke and attended the Coronation of George IV. While in London in October 1821 his father arranged for him to sit for Lawrence, the President of the Royal Academy and Britain's leading portrait portrait. Lawrence had painted the elder Vorontsov during his time as ambassador.

The work was shown at the Royal Academy Exhibition of 1822 at Somerset House. The painting is now in the Hermitage Museum in Saint Petersburg. A copy also exists in Wilton House, the Wiltshire home of his sister.

== Bibliography ==
- Blakesley, Rosalind Polly. Russian Genre Painting in the Nineteenth Century. Clarendon Press, 2000.
- King, Charles. Odessa: Genius and Death in a City of Dreams. W. W. Norton & Company, 2011.
- Levey, Michael. Sir Thomas Lawrence. Yale University Press, 2005.
- Rhinelander, Anthony L.H. Prince Michael Vorontsov: Viceroy to the Tsar. McGill-Queen's Press, 1990.
