= Victoria, Duchess of Kent with Princess Victoria =

Painting by William Beechey

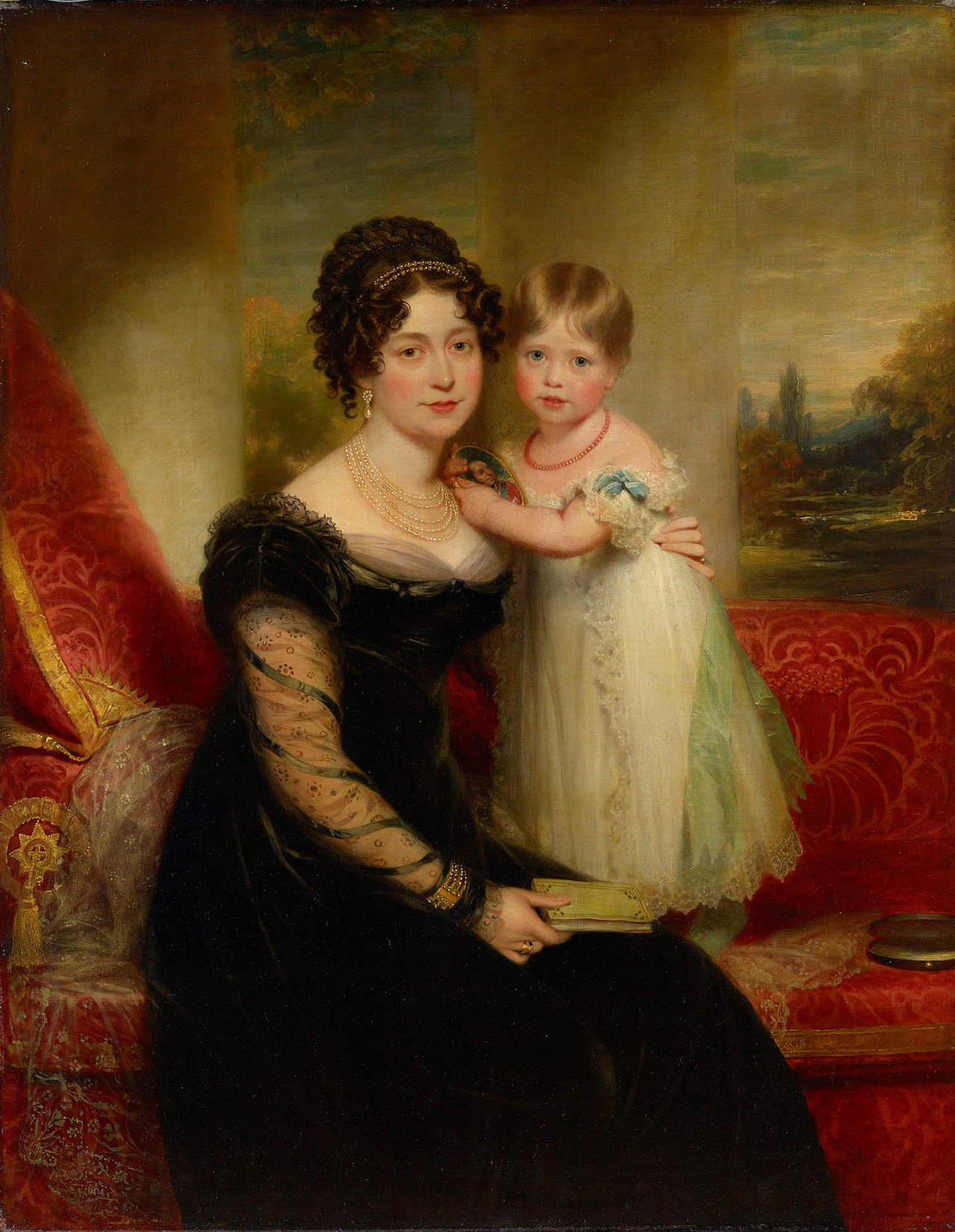
- Artist: William Beechey
- Year: 1821
- Type: Oil on canvas, portrait
- Dimensions: 144 cm × 113 cm (56.8 in × 44.6 in)
- Location: Royal Collection, Kensington Palace, London

Victoria, Duchess of Kent with Princess Victoria is an 1821 portrait painting by the British artist William Beechey of Victoria, Duchess of Kent and her young daughter, the future Queen Victoria. It was painted at Kensington Palace in London and completed the following year. It was exhibited at the Royal Academy in May 1822.

== History and description ==
It was commissioned by the Duchess for Leopold of Saxe-Coburg, the future King of Belgium. Leopold was the younger brother of the Duchess of York and the uncle of the young Victoria. He was the widower of Princess Charlotte of Wales who had been second in the line of succession order of succession before her death in 1817. Following Charlotte's death there had been an urgent need to secure new heirs to the throne, and the unmarried Edward, Duke of Kent had married Victoria in 1818. Their daughter was born in May 1819, but Kent's death from pneumonia a few months later ended the short marriage.

William Beechey was an experienced portraitist and member of the Royal Academy, who had painted British royalty on a number of occasions, and was paid around £265 in two installments. In the double portrait the Duchess is wearing mourning for her late husband while young Victoria clasps a miniature depicting him. The red cushion beside them features the Order of the Garter, probably a reference to the status of the young Princess. Beechey's composition shows the influence by earlier works by Joshua Reynolds, such as the 1759 depiction of Countess Spencer with her daughter, but also an awareness of the style of his fashionable contemporaries Thomas Lawrence and George Dawe.

It was displayed at the Royal Academy Exhibition of 1822 at Somerset House. Shortly after the completion the portrait was engraved by William Skelton and also copied by Henry Bone. The work was given to Queen Victoria in 1867 by Leopold's son Leopold II of Belgium and has remained part of the Royal Collection since then.

== See also ==
- Caroline, Princess of Wales and Princess Charlotte, an 1801 work by Thomas Lawrence
- Portrait of Augusta, Duchess of Cambridge, an 1818 work by Beechey

== Bibliography ==
- Kinzler, Julia. Representing Royalty: British Monarchs in Contemporary Cinema, 1994-2010. Cambridge Scholars Publishing, 2018.
- Murphy, Deirdre. The Young Victoria. Yale University Press, 2019.
