= Portrait of the Countess of Blessington =

1822 painting by Thomas Lawrence

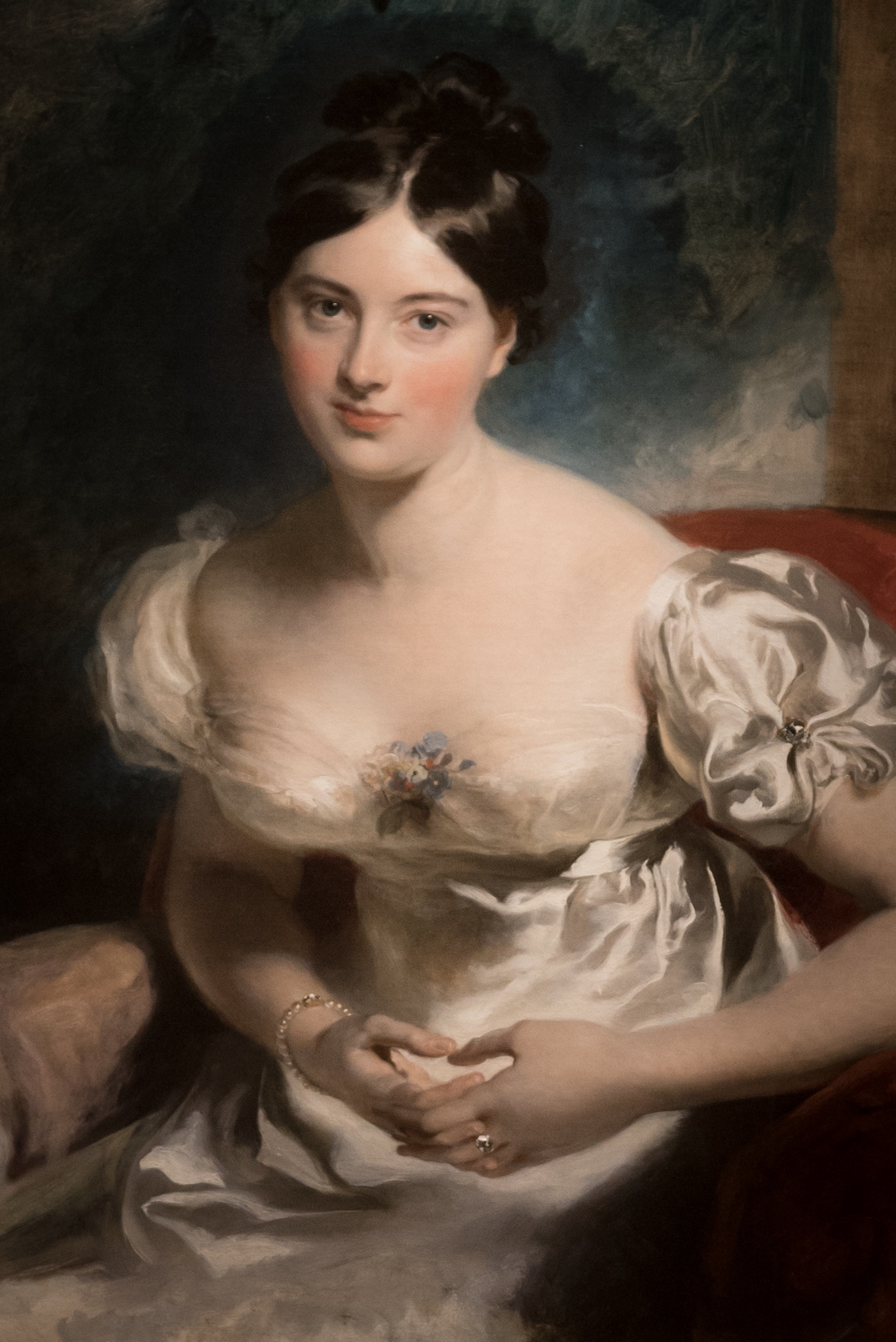
- Artist: Thomas Lawrence
- Year: 1822
- Type: Oil on canvas, portrait
- Dimensions: 91 cm × 67 cm (36 in × 26 in)
- Location: Wallace Collection, London

Portrait of Countess Blessington is an 1822 portrait painting by the English artist Sir Thomas Lawrence featuring the Irish aristocrat Marguerite Gardiner, Countess of Blessington.

Marguerite was born in Clonmel to the Old English Power family. Her first marriage was to an ex-English army officer. Widowed in 1817 she married the Anglo-Irish Earl Charles Gardiner the following year. She became known as a socialite in London. Lawrence was President of the Royal Academy and Britain's leading portraitist when he painted the Countess. He had a reputation for glamorous portraits of people of fashion. He exhibited his work at the Royal Academy Exhibition of 1822 at Somerset House, where it met with wide critical acclaim and launched Blessington as a celebrity. She later hosted a salon at Gore House in Kensington attended by Benjamin Disraeli, Charles Dickens and Clarkson Stanfield.

Today the painting is in the Wallace Collection in Manchester Square in Marylebone. A copy of the painting is displayed prominently at Hughenden Manor, Benjamin Disraeli's house in Buckinghamshire, now in the care of the National Trust.

== Bibliography ==
- Levey, Michael. Sir Thomas Lawrence. Yale University Press, 2005. ISBN 0300109989.
- Lipska, Aneta. The Travel Writings of Marguerite Blessington: The Most Gorgeous Lady on the Tour. Anthem Press, 2017. ISBN 1783086785.
