= Portrait of Hannah More =

Painting by Henry William Pickersgill

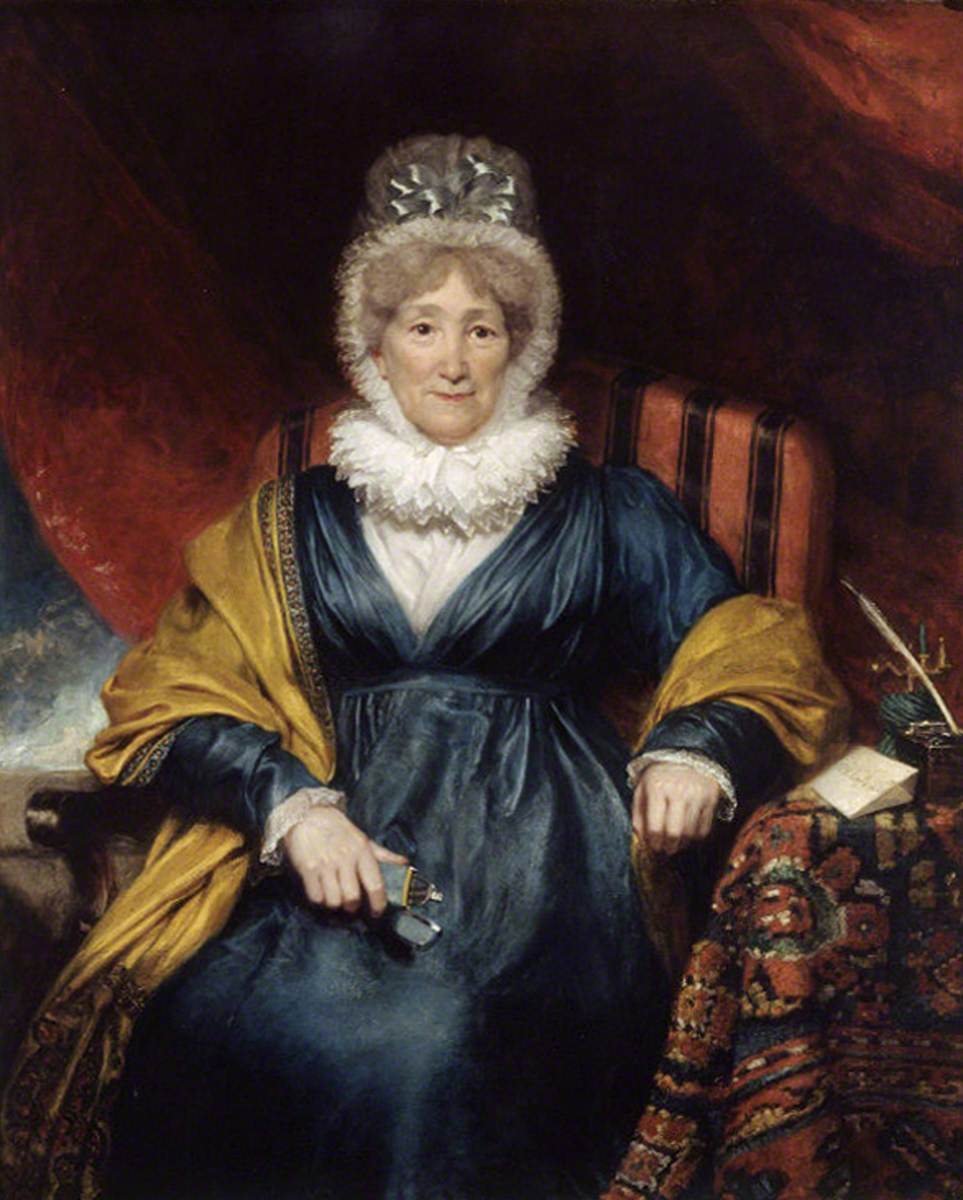
- Artist: Henry William Pickersgill
- Year: 1821
- Type: Oil on canvas, portrait painting
- Dimensions: 127 cm × 101.6 cm (50 in × 40.0 in)
- Location: Killerton, Devon

Portrait of Hannah More is an oil on canvas portrait painting by the British artist Henry William Pickersgill, from 1821.

== History and description ==
It depicts Hannah More, a noted bluestocking. A conservative feminist she was associated with the abolitionist campaign to end slavery. The painting was produced when she was in her seventies and shows her as a dignified figure in a lace cap. She wears a blue dress, and her intellectualism is emphasised by the spectacles she holds in her hand.

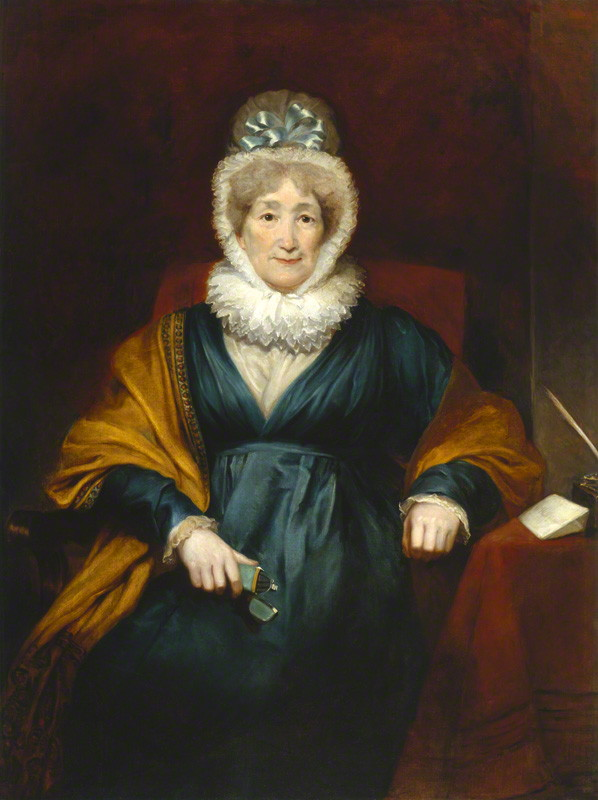
Version in the National Portrait Gallery

The original version of the picture was commissioned Sir Thomas Acland, and presented as a gift to his friend and ally Sir Robert Inglis, another member of the Clapham Sect of social reformers. It is now at Killerton in Devon, overseen by the National Trust. It was displayed at the Royal Academy Exhibition of 1822 held at Somerset House in London.

A number of replica versions were produced by Pickersgill, including one in the National Portrait Gallery, in London, which was acquired in 1875.

An engraving was produced by William Henry Worthington in 1824 based on the painting.

== Bibliography ==
- Eger, Elizabeth (ed.) Bluestockings Displayed: on Portraiture, Performance and Patronage, 1730-1830. Cambridge University Press, 2013.
