= Portrait of George IV (Wallace Collection) =

1822 painting by Thomas Lawrence

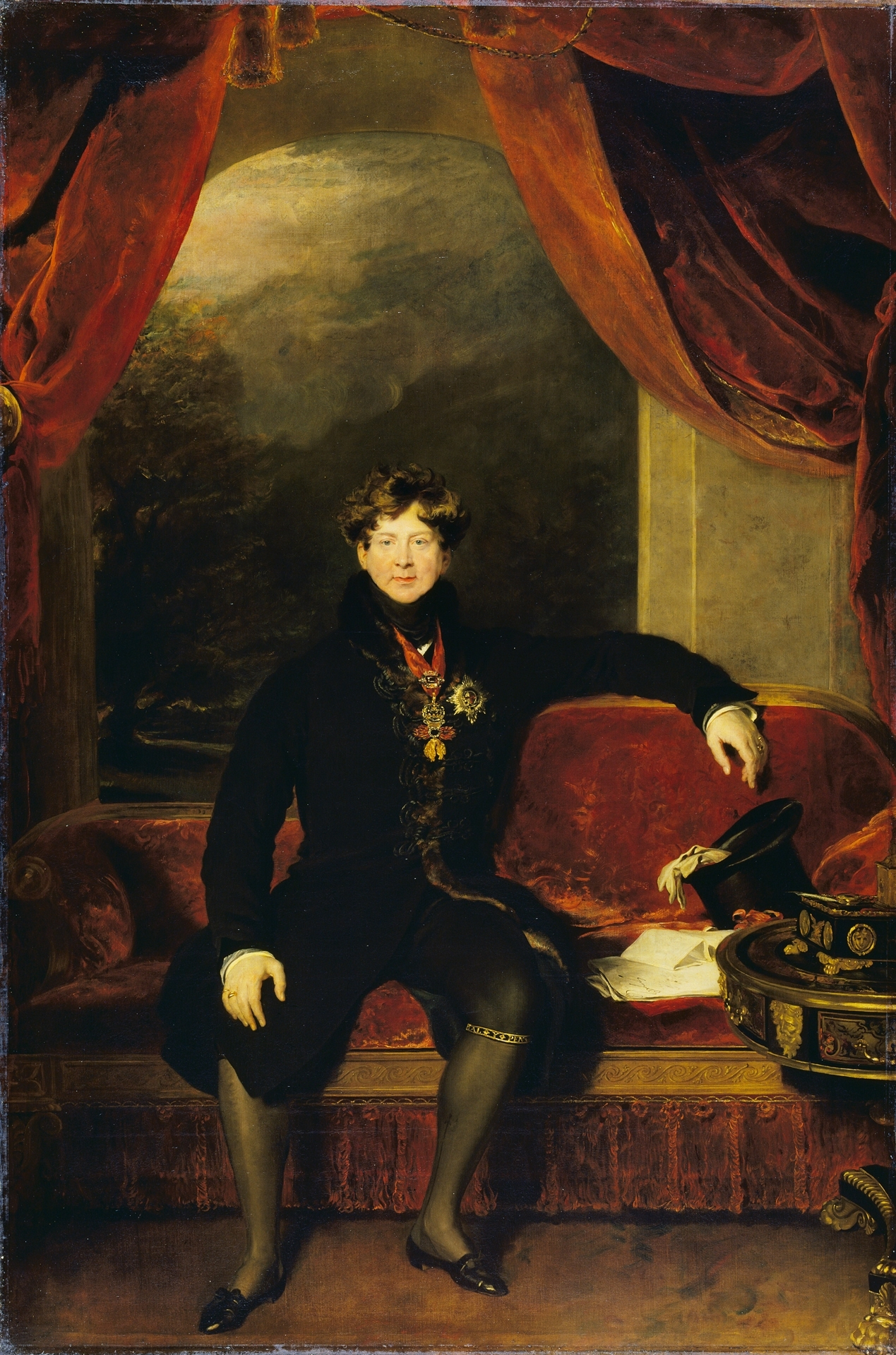
- Artist: Thomas Lawrence
- Year: 1822
- Type: Oil on canvas, portrait painting
- Dimensions: 270.5 cm × 179 cm (106.5 in × 70 in)
- Location: Wallace Collection; London

Portrait of George IV is an 1822 portrait painting by the British artist Thomas Lawrence. It depicts George IV who reigned from 1820 until 1830, having previously been Prince Regent. The artist was the leading portrait painter of the Regency Era and received a large number of commissions from George.

== History and description ==
The previous year Lawrence had painted a portrait of the king in his ceremonial robes that he has worn at his July 1821 Coronation at Westminster Abbey and was exhibited at the Royal Academy Exhibition of 1822. This second, more informal portrait was a sharp contrast and was produced as a gift for the king's mistress Lady Conyngham. The king is shown seated on a sofa dressed in black and wearing the decorations of the Austrian Order of the Golden Fleece as well as the British Order of the Garter. It became a well-known image of the king, which Lawrence considered his most successful depiction of George, and was engraved five times by 1841 for circulation as prints. It was referred to in Charles Dickens' Bleak House and William Makepeace Thackeray's Vanity Fair.

The work was in 1883 acquired by the art collector Sir Richard Wallace to hang at Hertford House in Manchester Square. Ironically this had once been the home of George's earlier mistress the Marchioness of Hertford where he had frequently visited her before she was displaced by Lady Conyngham. Today the painting is on display as part of the Wallace Collection. A second smaller version was produced by Lawrence's studio and is now in the Royal Collection.

== Bibliography ==
- Ingamells, John. The Wallace Collection: British, German, Italian, Spanish. ISBN 9780266869672. Wallace Collection, 1985.
- Levey, Michael. Sir Thomas Lawrence. ISBN 0300109989. Yale University Press, 2005.
- Smith, E.A. George IV. ISBN 0300088027. Yale University Press, 1999.
