= What You Will! =

Painting by J. M. W. Turner

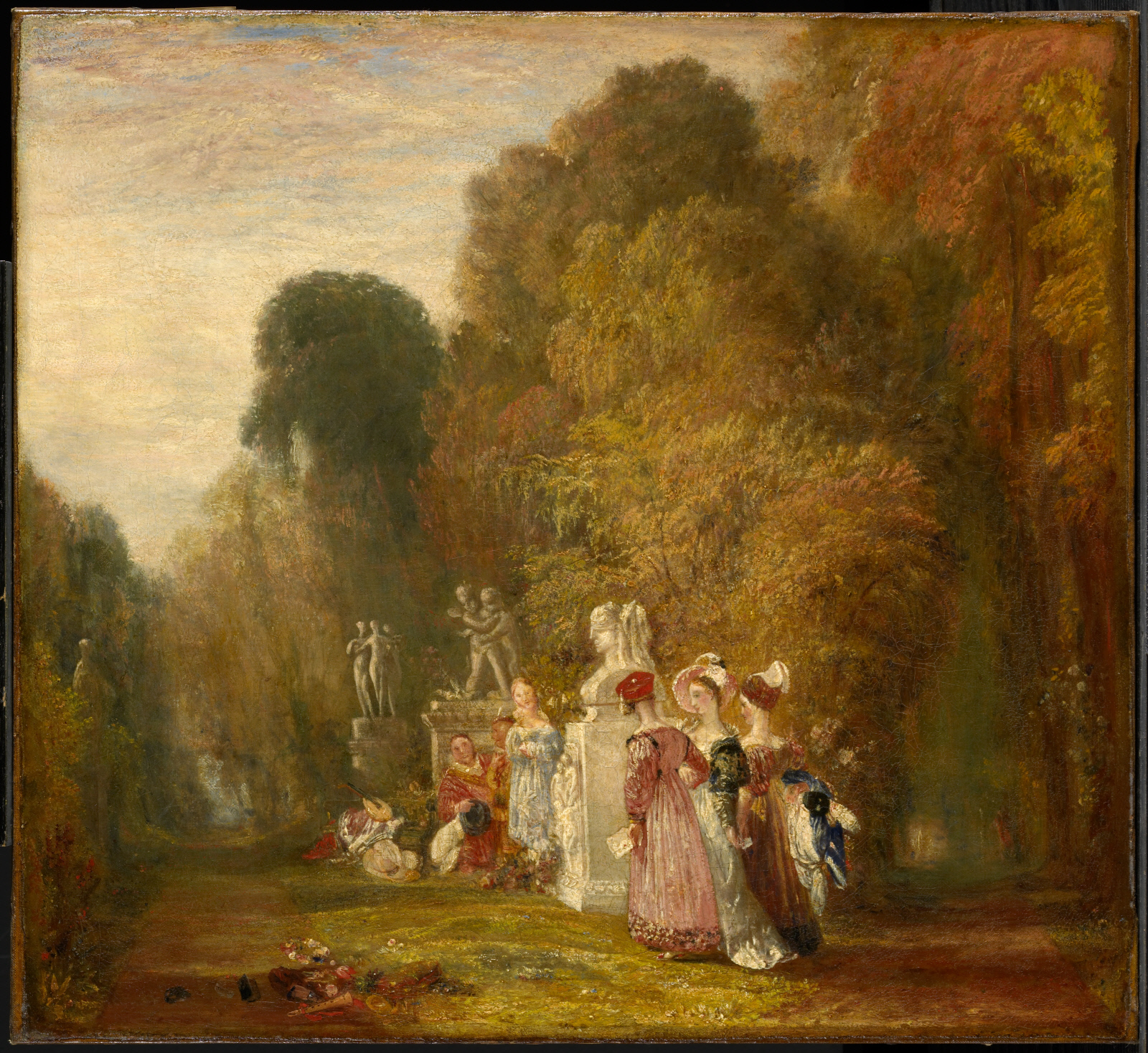
- Artist: J. M. W. Turner
- Year: 1822
- Type: Oil on canvas, genre painting
- Dimensions: 49.8 cm × 54.3 cm (19.6 in × 21.4 in)
- Location: Clark Art Institute, Massachusetts

What You Will! is an 1822 oil painting by the British artist J.M.W. Turner. A distinct, unusual work in his output it pays tribute to the early eighteenth century French Old Master Antoine Watteau and the Fête galante style he pioneered. As the title indicates, it also drew inspiration from William Shakespeare's play Twelfth Night for which this is the subtitle.

The picture was displayed at the Royal Academy Exhibition of 1822 at Somerset House in London. It was bought by Turner's friend the sculptor Francis Leggatt Chantrey. The painting is now in the collection of the Clark Art Institute in Massachusetts, which has owned it since 2007.

== See also ==
- List of paintings by J. M. W. Turner

== Bibliography ==
- Bailey, Anthony. J.M.W. Turner: Standing in the Sun. Tate Enterprises, 2013.
- Costello, Leo. J.M.W. Turner and the Subject of History. Routledge, 2017.
- Moyle, Franny. Turner: The Extraordinary Life and Momentous Times of J. M. W. Turner. Penguin Books, 2016.
