= Gore House =

House in Kensington, London, England

Coordinates: 51.5011°N 0.1774°W

Crop of Christopher and John Greenwood's 8 inch-to-mile map published in 1827 from an 1830 republication (click to view all). In the far east is (also knocked down) Kingston House, with longer grounds.

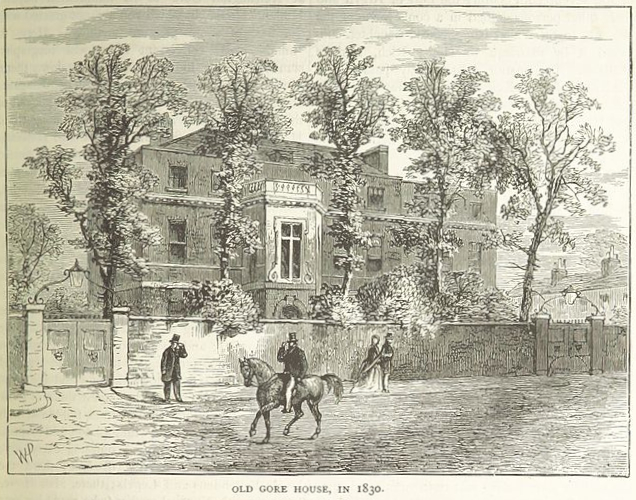
Old Gore House, in 1830

Gore House, built in the 1750s, with its 3-acre (1.2 ha) grounds was in Middlesex, England in a large exclave of St Margaret Westminster, Kensington Gore. Until its west wing soon became Grove House it was set apart from the east end of a row of 18th-century houses running from Palace Gate (near Kensington Palace) to the east, and was part of a phase of such houses facing Kensington Gardens as far as Knightsbridge, a broad bridge across the West Bourne. As the 1831 map, inset, shows: Upper Kensington Gore was the short-lived name for a short section of Kensington Road/Gore which was fronted by grand houses with large grounds and by Kensington Gardens. Its interiors were planned and supervised by leading architect Robert Adam.

Between 1808 and 1821 William Wilberforce lived in it; he co-led the abolition of the slave trade and then slavery in the British Empire. It was occupied by the Countess of Blessington and the Count D'Orsay from 1836 to 1849. In May 1851, certain floors were converted to restaurant by the chef Alexis Soyer, with the aim of competing with and catering for the Great Exhibition in Hyde Park to the north.

After the exhibition, it was bought by the Royal Commission for the Exhibition of 1851, for the Albertopolis cultural and educational sites. Today the Royal Albert Hall takes up its site.
