= View on the Stour near Dedham =

Painting by John Constable

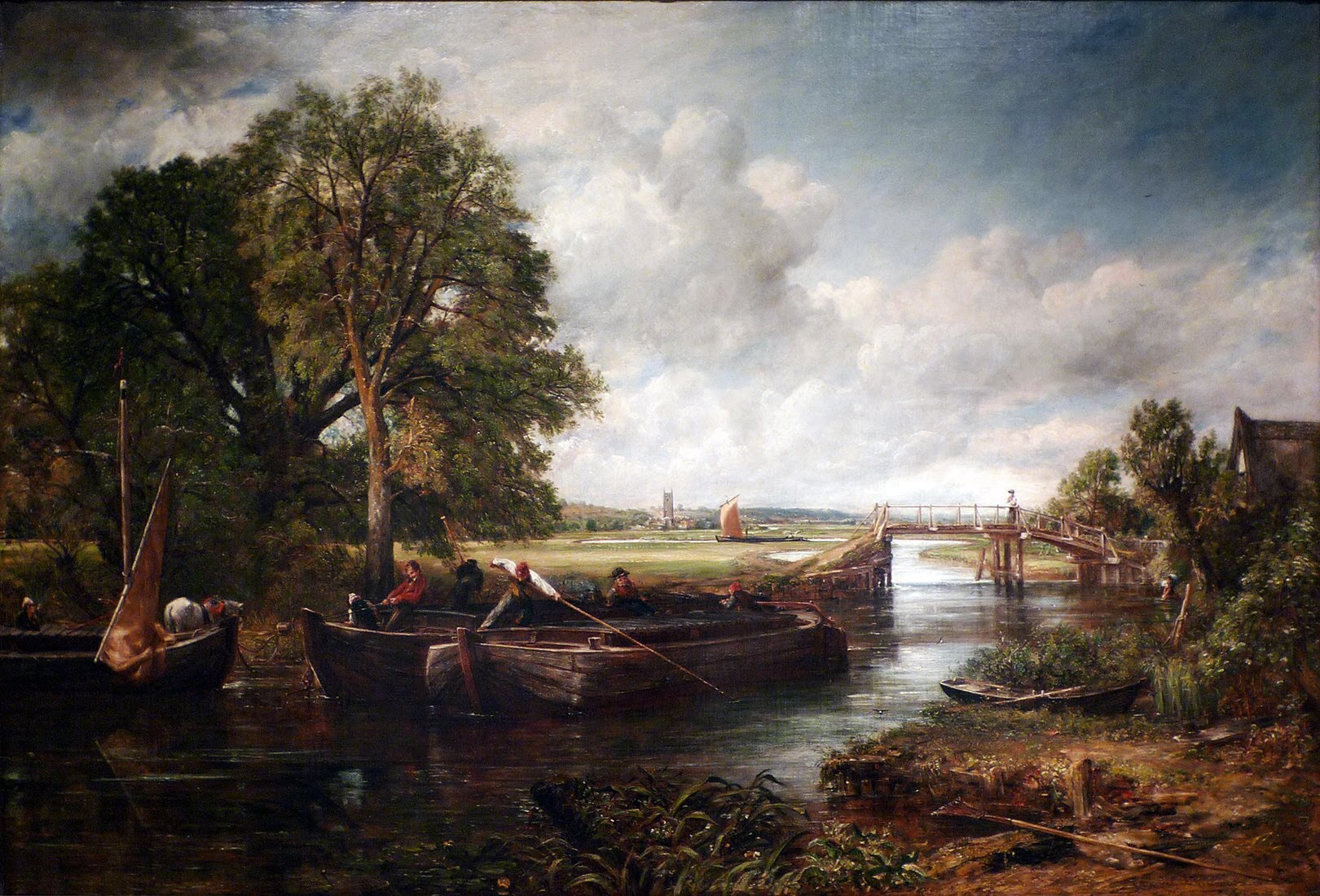
- Artist: John Constable
- Year: 1822
- Type: Oil on canvas, landscape painting
- Dimensions: 129.5 cm × 188 cm (51.0 in × 74 in)
- Location: Huntington Library, San Marino, California

View on the Stour near Dedham is an 1822 landscape painting by the British artist John Constable. It portrays a view on the River Stour near Dedham on the border between Essex and Suffolk. Constable produced many landscapes depicting the area, now known as Constable Country. It was one of the large "six-footers" he produced and was his principal exhibit at the Royal Academy Exhibition of 1822 at Somerset House. It was displayed again at the British Institution the following year, then made a sensation when it was exhibited along with The Hay Wain at the Salon of 1824 at the Louvre in Paris.

The painting is in the collection of the Huntington Library in San Marino, California. A full-scale study was at one point owned by Royal Holloway.

== See also ==
- List of paintings by John Constable

== Bibliography ==
- Bailey, Anthony. John Constable: A Kingdom of his Own. Random House, 2012.
- Noon, Patrick & Bann, Stephen. Constable to Delacroix: British Art and the French Romantics. Tate, 2003.
- Reynolds, Graham. Constable's England. Metropolitan Museum of Art, 1983.
- Thornes, John E. John Constable's Skies: A Fusion of Art and Science. A&C Black, 1999.
