= View of Lower Terrace, Hampstead =

Painting by John Constable

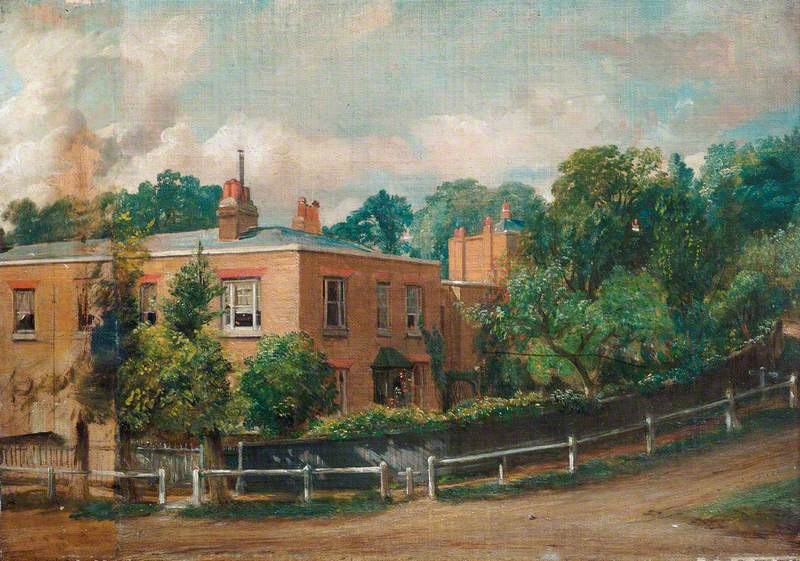
- Artist: John Constable
- Year: 1822
- Type: Oil on canvas, landscape painting
- Dimensions: 24.8 cm × 35.2 cm (9.8 in × 13.9 in)
- Location: Victoria and Albert Museum, London

View of Lower Terrace, Hampstead is an 1822 landscape painting by the British artist John Constable. It shows the view from Constable's residence at 2 Lower Terrace in Hampstead, then located in the countryside outside London. The Constable family had moved to Hampstead in 1819 and it featured prominently in his work form this point.

The work was displayed at the Royal Academy Exhibition of 1822 at Somerset House. Today it is in the collection of the Victoria and Albert Museum in South Kensington, having been part of the Constable Bequest by the artist's daughter Isabel in 1888.

== See also ==
- List of paintings by John Constable

== Bibliography ==
- Hamilton, James. Constable: A Portrait. Hachette UK, 2022.
- Morris, Edward. Constable's Clouds: Paintings and Cloud Studies by John Constable. National Galleries of Scotland, 2000.
- Parkinson, Ronald. John Constable: The Man and His Art. Harry N. Abrams, 1998.
- Roe, Sonia. Oil Paintings in Public Ownership in the Victoria and Albert Museum. Public Catalogue Foundation, 2008.
