= Eve at the Fountain =

1822 sculpture

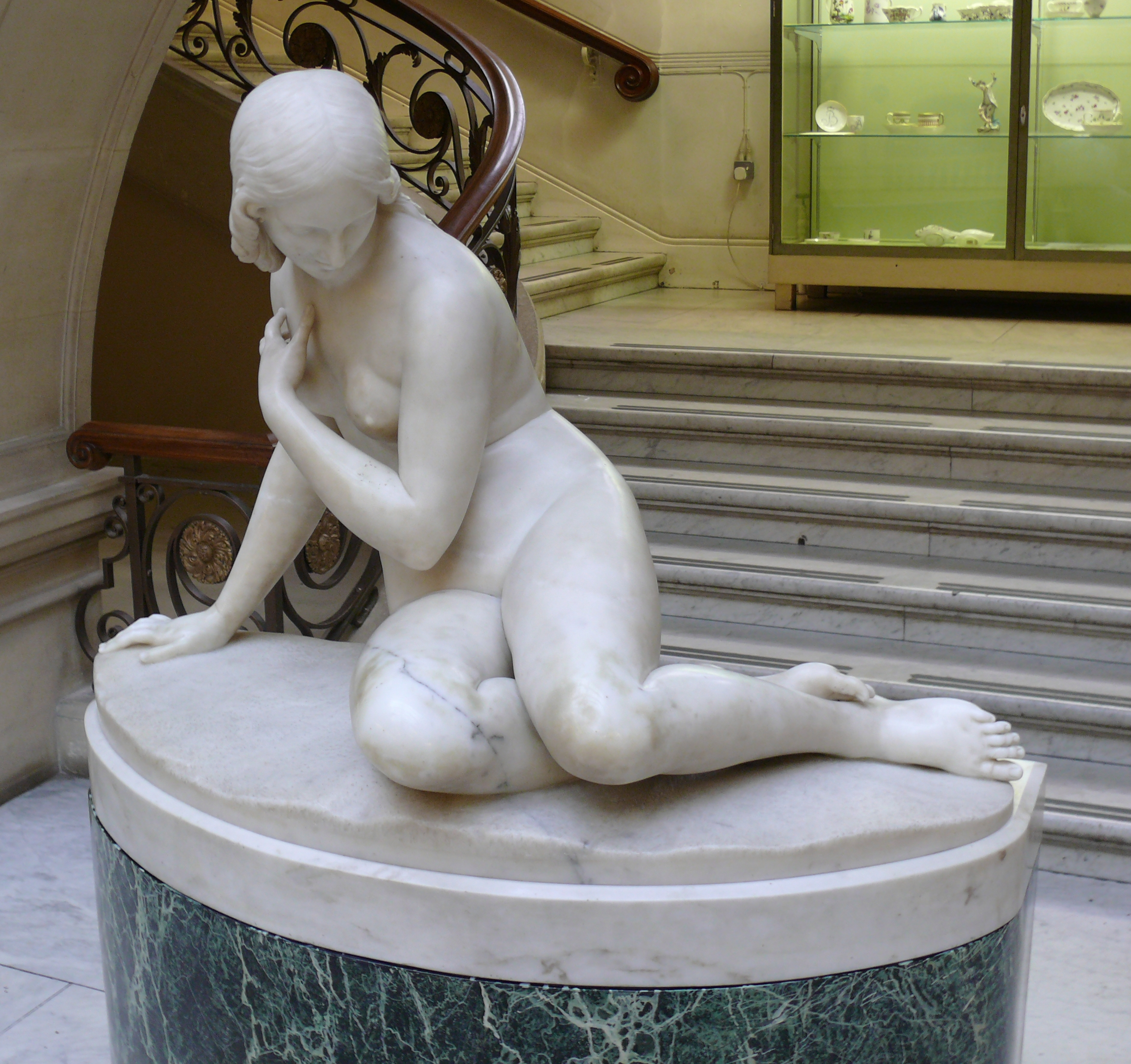
- Artist: Edward Hodges Baily
- Year: 1822
- Medium: Marble
- Dimensions: 84 cm × 122.8 cm (2.76 ft × 4.03 ft)
- Location: City Museum and Art Gallery, Bristol

Eve at the Fountain is an 1822 sculpture by the British artist Edward Hodges Baily. It depicts a scene from John Milton's epic poem Paradise Lost in which Eve sees her own reflection for the first time in a pool of water. It is regarded as Baily's most celebrated sculpture. Neoclassical in style it references Nymph with a Shell, a statue from Ancient Rome.

Baily displayed an earlier plaster model of the work at the Royal Academy Exhibition of 1818 at Somerset House which helped establish his reputation. He displayed a version of the marble at the Royal Academy Exhibition of 1822 and again at the British Institution in 1823. The work was acquired in 1826 for 600 guineas by subscribers to the Bristol Institution to be housed at the City Museum and Art Gallery and remains in the collection today.

In 1842 Baily produced sequel Eve Listening to the Voice of Adam, now in the Victoria and Albert Museum.

== Bibliography ==
- Di Bello, Patrizia. Sculptural Photographs: From the Calotype to Digital Technologies. Bloomsbury Academic, 2018.
