= Hampstead Heath, with a Bonfire =

Painting by John Constable

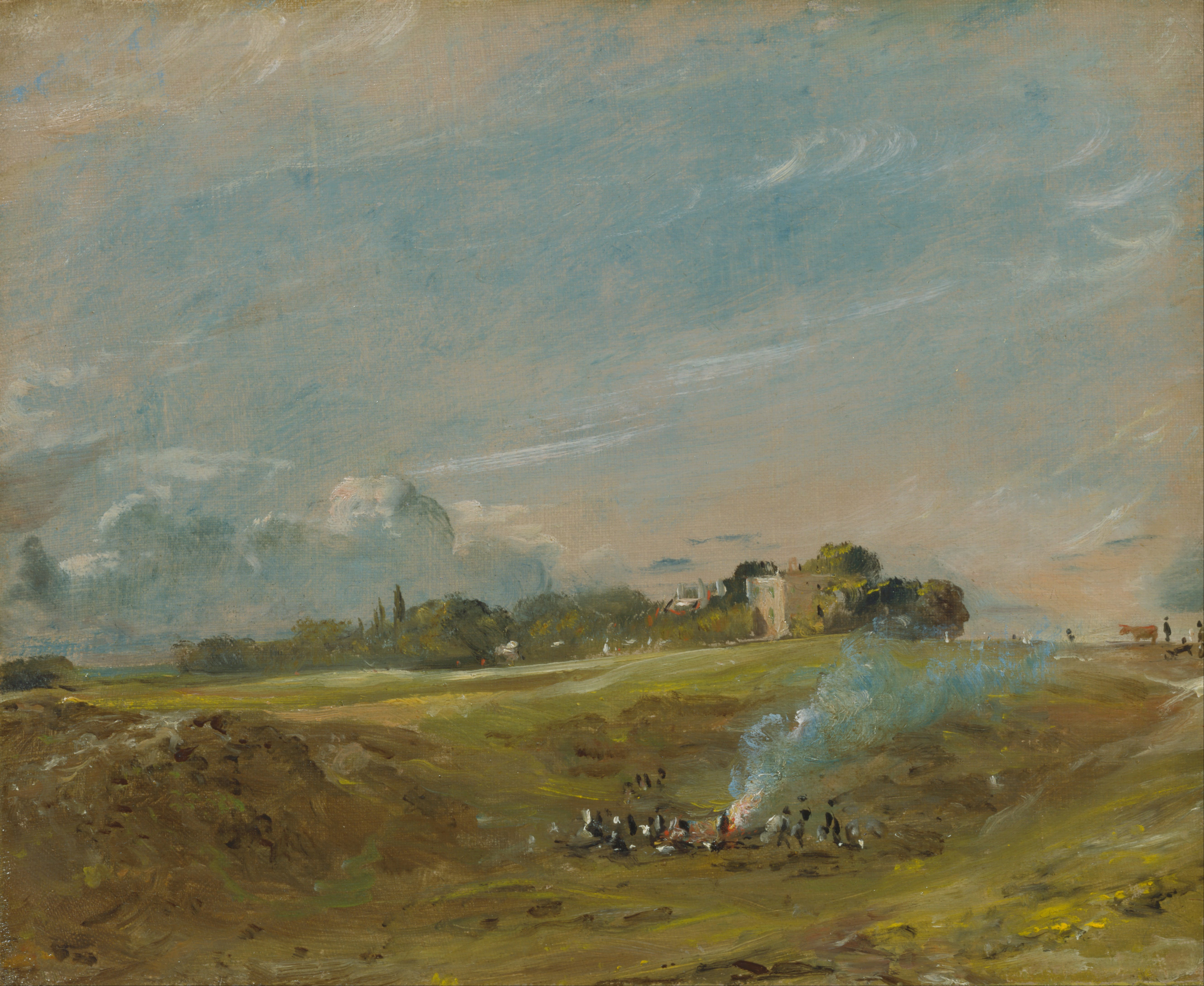
- Artist: John Constable
- Year: 1822
- Type: Oil on canvas, Landscape painting
- Dimensions: 31.4 cm × 36.8 cm (12.4 in × 14.5 in)
- Location: Yale Center for British Art, New Haven, Connecticut

Hampstead Heath, with a Bonfire is a c.1822 landscape painting by the British artist John Constable. It depicts a view of Hampstead Heath, close to where Constable and his family had been living since 1819. In several views of the Heath, Constable uses relatively small human figures to emphasise its size.

Today it is in the Yale Center for British Art in Connecticut, having been acquired in 1999 through Paul Mellon.

== See also ==
- List of paintings by John Constable

== Bibliography ==
- Bailey, Anthony. John Constable: A Kingdom of his Own. Random House, 2012.
- Charles, Victoria. Constable. Parkstone International, 2015.
- Hamilton, James. Constable: A Portrait. Hachette UK, 2022.
- Reynolds, Graham. Constable's England. Metropolitan Museum of Art, 1983.
