= Marguerite Gardiner, Countess of Blessington =

Irish novelist, journalist, and literary hostess

The Right Honourable The Countess of Blessington
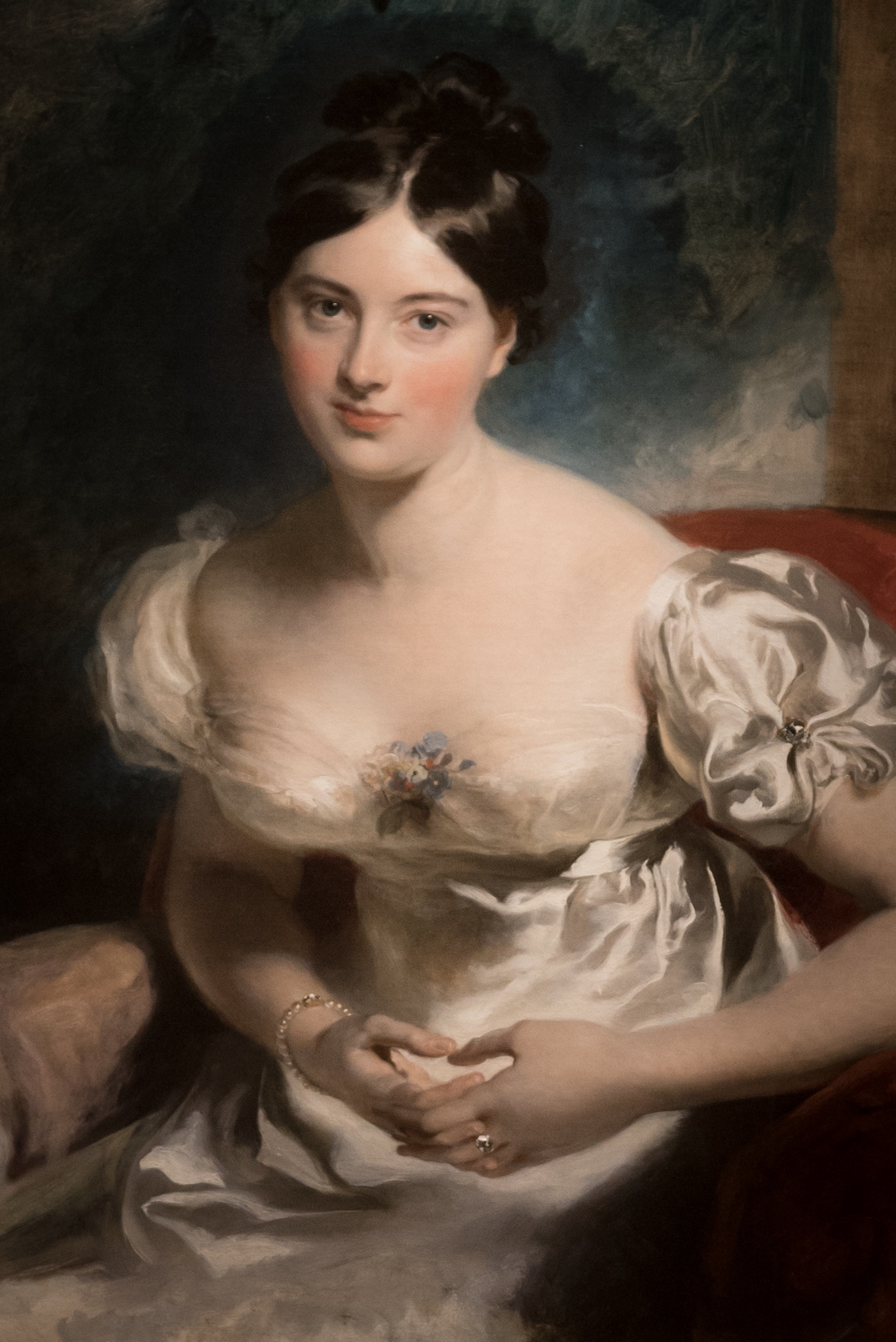
- Portrait of the Countess of Blessington by Sir Thomas Lawrence, 1822
- Born: Margaret Power; 1 September 1789; Clonmel, County Tipperary, Kingdom of Ireland
- Died: 4 June 1849 (aged 59); Paris, France
- Occupations: Novelist, miscellaneous writer
- Spouse(s): Cpt. Maurice St. Leger Farmer (m. 1804–1817; his death); Charles Gardiner, 1st Earl of Blessington (m. 1818–1829; his death)
- Relatives: Marguerite Helen Power (great-niece)
- Writing career
- Notable work: Conversations with Lord Byron (1834)

Marguerite Gardiner, Countess of Blessington (née Power; 1 September 1789 – 4 June 1849), was an Irish novelist, journalist, and literary hostess. She became acquainted with Lord Byron in Genoa and wrote a book about her conversations with him.

== Early life ==
Born Margaret Power, near Clonmel in County Tipperary, Kingdom of Ireland, she was a daughter of Edmund Power and Ellen Sheehy, small landowners. She was "haphazardly educated by her own reading and by her mother's friend Ann Dwyer." Her childhood was blighted by her father's character and poverty, and her early womanhood was made "wretched" by a compulsory marriage at the age of fifteen to Captain Maurice St. Leger Farmer, a military officer whose drunken habits finally brought him as a debtor to the King's Bench Prison, where he died by falling out of a window in October 1817. She had left him after three months.

Marguerite later moved to Hampshire to live for five years with the family of Captain Thomas Jenkins of the 11th Light Dragoons, a sympathetic and literary army officer. Jenkins introduced her to Charles Gardiner, 1st Earl of Blessington, a widower with four children (two legitimate), seven years her senior. They married at St Mary's, Bryanston Square, Marylebone, on 16 February 1818, four months after her first husband's death.

== Grand tour ==
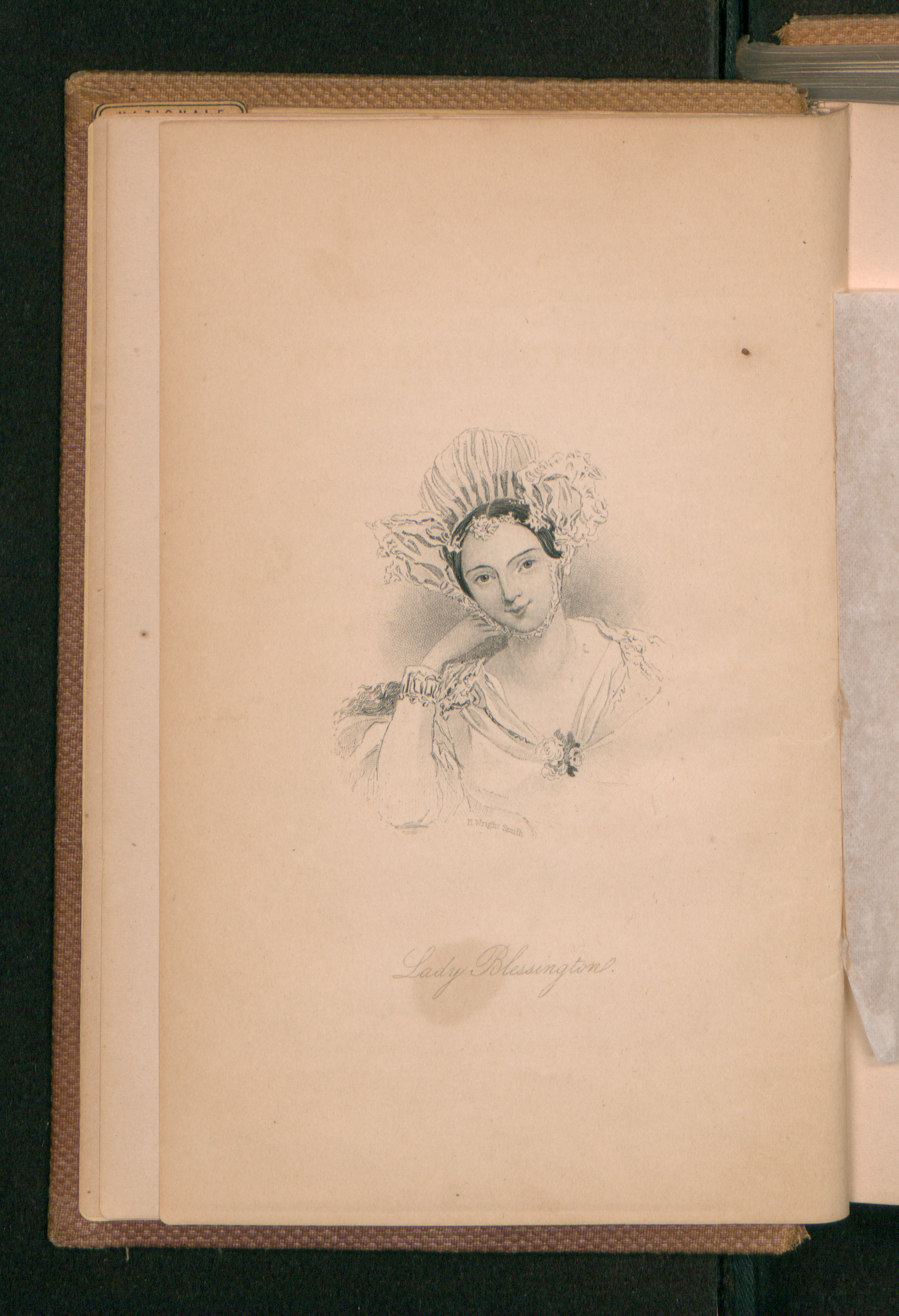
Journal of conversation with Lord Byron, 1859

Of rare beauty, charm and wit, she was no less distinguished for her generosity and for the extravagant tastes she shared with her second husband. On 25 August 1822 they set out for a continental tour with Marguerite's youngest sister, the 21-year-old Mary Anne, and servants. On the way they met Count D'Orsay (who had first become an intimate of Lady Blessington in London in 1821) in Avignon on 20 November 1822, before settling at Genoa for four months from 31 March 1823. There they met Byron on several occasions, giving Lady Blessington material for her Conversations with Lord Byron.

After that they settled for the most part in Naples, where she met the Irish writer Richard Robert Madden, who was to become her biographer. They also spent time in Florence with their friend Walter Savage Landor, author of Imaginary Conversations, which she greatly admired.

== London salon ==
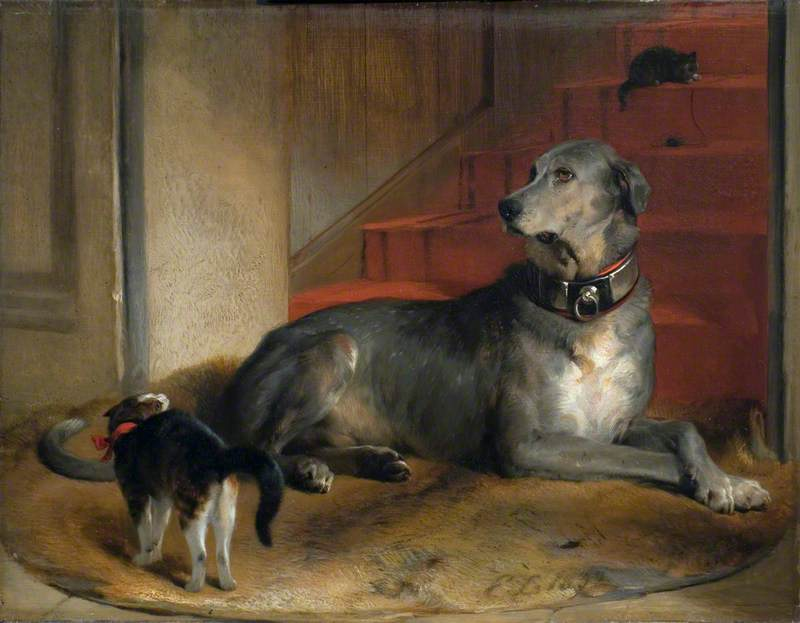
Lady Blessington's Dog, 1832 painting commissioned by the countess from her friend Edwin Landseer

It was in Italy, on 1 December 1827, that Count D'Orsay married Harriet Gardiner, Lord Blessington's only daughter by his former wife. The Blessingtons and the newly-wed couple moved to Paris towards the end of 1828, taking up residence in the Hôtel Maréchal Ney, where the Earl suddenly died at 46 of an apoplectic stroke in 1829. D'Orsay and Harriet then accompanied Lady Blessington to England, but the couple separated soon afterwards amidst much acrimony. D'Orsay continued to live with Marguerite until her death. Their home, first at Seamore Place, now named Curzon Square, and afterwards Gore House, Kensington, now the site of the Royal Albert Hall, became a centre of attraction for all that was distinguished in literature, learning, art, science and fashion. Benjamin Disraeli wrote Venetia whilst staying there, and it was at her home that Hans Christian Andersen first met Charles Dickens. In 1840, Franz Liszt, an admirer of Lord Byron, was a guest performer at one of the salons.

After her husband's death she supplemented her diminished income by contributing to various periodicals as well as by writing novels. She was for some years editor of The Book of Beauty and The Keepsake, popular annuals of the day. In 1834 she published her Conversations with Lord Byron. Her Idler in Italy (1839–1840), and Idler in France (1841) were popular for their personal gossip and anecdotes, descriptions of nature and sentiment. Blessington became a gossip columnist for Dickens' Daily News.

Early in 1849, Count D'Orsay left Gore House to escape his creditors; subsequently the furniture and decorations were sold in a public sale successfully discharging Lady Blessington's debts. Lady Blessington joined the Count in Paris. They stayed at a hotel, and then moved to a residence close to Agénor de Gramont, 10th Duke of Gramont (Count D'Orsay's nephew from his sister Anna-Quintina-Albertine "Ida" Grimod, Duchess de Garmont), where they would also dine "en famille".

=== Death ===
She died on 4 June 1849. The autopsy took place the next day, when it was discovered that enlargement of the heart to nearly double the natural size, which enlargement must have been progressing for a period of at least twenty-five years, though incipient disease of the stomach and liver had complicated the symptoms.

She was buried in the monument made by Count D'Orsay, in which he would also be buried.

== Literary tributes ==
Portrait of Marguerite, Countess of Blessington, 1838, par Hippolyte Masson, 1807-1878 - RB H11 - Newstead Abbey

Letitia Elizabeth Landon's poetical illustration To Marguerite, Countess of Blessington to a portrait by Alfred Edward Chalon was published in Fisher's Drawing Room Scrap Book, 1839.

Zadie Smith, The Fraud (2023)

== Selected publications ==
- Conversations of Lord Byron with the Countess of Blessington (1834)
- Gems of Beauty Displayed in a Series of Twelve Highly Finished Engravings (London: Longman, Rees, Orme, Brown, Green and Longman, 1836), verse, illustrated by E. T. Parris
- The Passions (1838), verse
- Idler in Italy (1839–1840)
- Idler in France (1841)
- Digitized version of Journal of conversation with Lord Byron. 1859.

== Biographies ==
Her Literary Life and Correspondence (3 vols), edited by Richard Robert Madden, appeared in 1855. Her portrait was painted in 1822 by Sir Thomas Lawrence and can be seen in The Wallace Collection, London.

Michael Sadleir was the author of Blessington-D'Orsay: A Masquerade, published in 1933 by Constable & Co.

A more detailed account of the Countess's relations with D'Orsay appears in The Last of the Dandies by Nick Foulkes (2003).

• Morning Post, 5 June 1849	• Athenæum, 9 June 1849, p. 599
• Memoir prefixed to Country Quarters, vol. i. pp. iii-xxiii, 1850	• Grantley Berkeley's Recollections, vol. iii. ch. x. Gore House, pp. 201–31, 1865
• Jerdan's Autobiography, iv. 320-1	• C. Mathews's Autobiography, i. 60-165
• Annual Register for 1849, pp. 245–6	• Gent. Mag. August 1849, pp. 202–3
• Chorley's Authors of England, pp. 28–30, 1861	• Madden's Life of the Countess of Blessington, 3 vols. 8vo, 1855
• Illustrated London News, 9 June 1849, p. 396.	
