= Smugglers Alarmed by an Unexpected Change from Hazy Weathers, while Landing their Cargo =

Painting by Augustus Wall Callcott

- Artist: Augustus Wall Callcott
- Year: 1822
- Type: Oil on canvas, landscape painting
- Dimensions: 160 cm × 259 cm (63 in × 102 in)
- Location: National Maritime Museum, London

Smugglers Alarmed by an Unexpected Change from Hazy Weathers, while Landing their Cargo is an oil painting by the British artist Augustus Wall Callcott, from 1822.

== History and description ==
Combining elements of landscape painting and genre painting it depicts a band of smugglers attempting to land their contraband cargo on the southern English coast, who are disturbed by a sudden change in the weather. It is set on an imaginary stretch of coast, although possibly inspired by cliffs near Hastings in Sussex. The work was commissioned by the Hampshire Member of Parliament Sir Thomas Heathcote.

It was shown at the Royal Academy Exhibition of 1822 at Somerset House. The Scots Magazine described it as the "finest work in the exhibition", with the exception of David Wilkie's Chelsea Pensioners Reading the Waterloo Dispatch and amongst the only works on display, along with Thomas Lawrence's portraits, to "evince real genius". Today the painting is in the collection of the National Maritime Museum, having been acquired in 2012.
