= Royal Academy Exhibition of 1822 =

1822 art exhibition in London

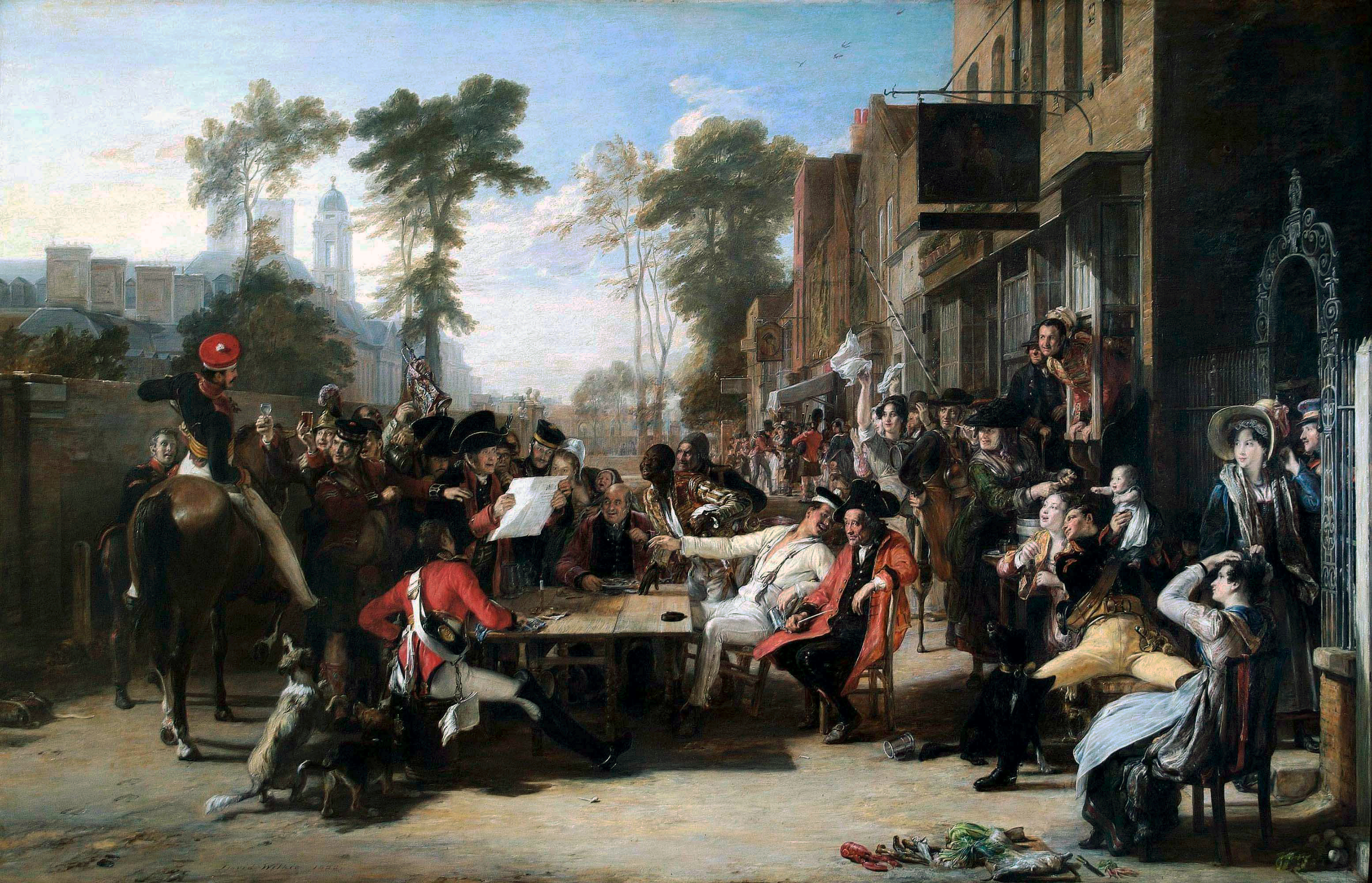
Chelsea Pensioners Reading the Waterloo Dispatch by David Wilkie

The Royal Academy Exhibition of 1822 was the annual Summer Exhibition of the Royal Academy of Arts. It was held at Somerset House between 6 May and 13 July 1822 and featured over a thousand exhibits.

By far the most popular attraction on display was Chelsea Pensioners Reading the Waterloo Dispatch by the Scottish artist David Wilkie. Commissioned by the Duke of Wellington and having taken several years to complete, it required a railing to be erected to hold back the crowds.

The President of the Royal Academy Thomas Lawrence exhibited several works notably his Portrait of George IV in his coronation robes as well as Emily Anderson as Little Red Riding Hood. Also on display were his depictions of the Duke of Wellington of the Russian general Portrait of Mikhail Vorontsov. His painting of the fashionable Irish aristocrat Portrait of the Countess of Blessington was widely praised. His fellow portrait painter William Beechey's Victoria, Duchess of Kent with Princess Victoria showed the future Queen Victoria as a child with her mother.

J.M.W. Turner submitted only a single work What You Will! a homage to the style of the French painter Jean-Antoine Watteau. John Constable's chief exhibit was the landscape View on the Stour near Dedham, one of his "six-footers" featuring a rural view on the River Stour in Suffolk. As with The Hay Wain at the Exhibition of 1821, this attracted limited interest only to achieve great success once it appeared at the Salon of 1824 in France. Augustus Wall Callcott displayed Smugglers Alarmed, a mixture of landscape and genre work.

== Gallery ==
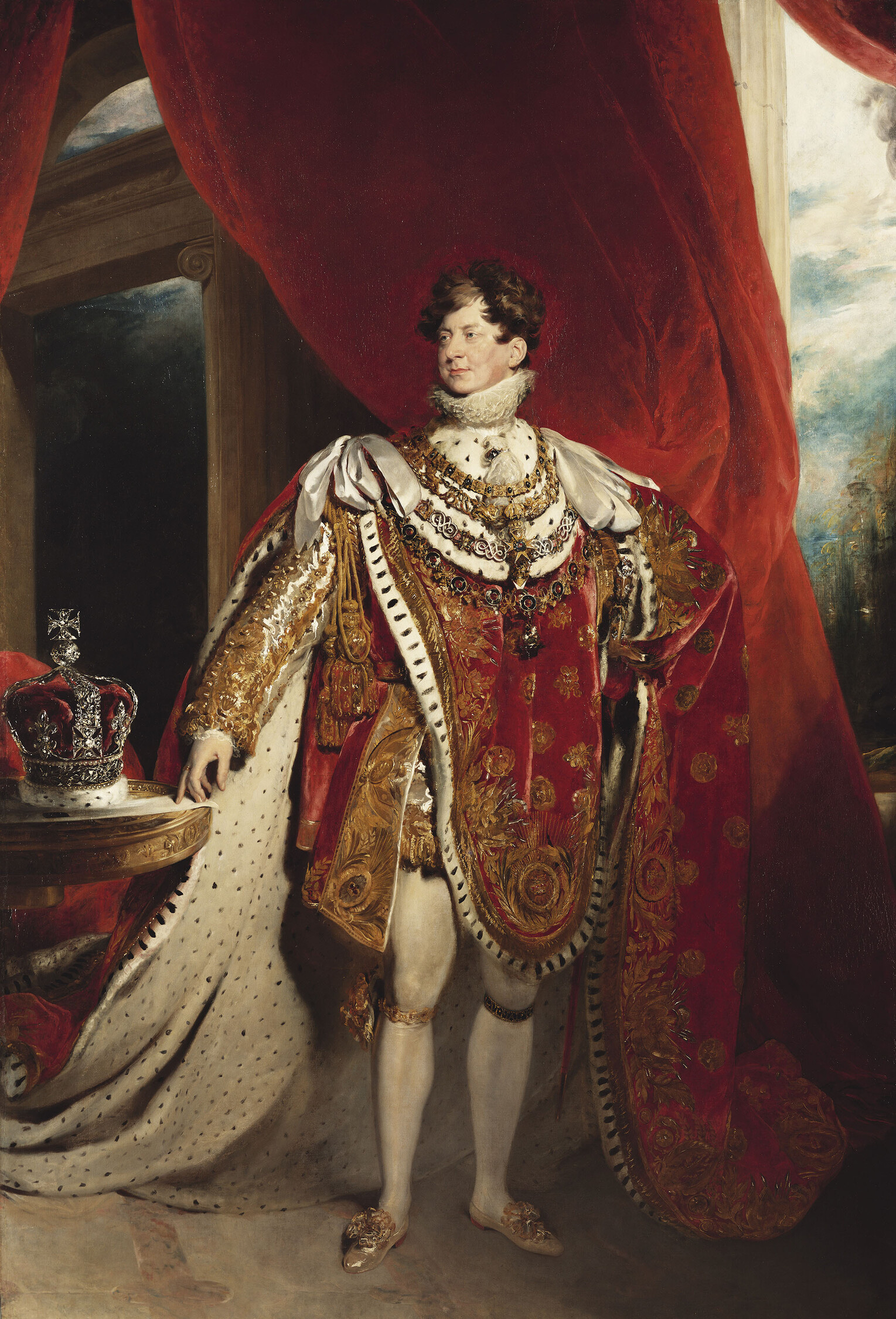
Portrait of George IV by Thomas Lawrence

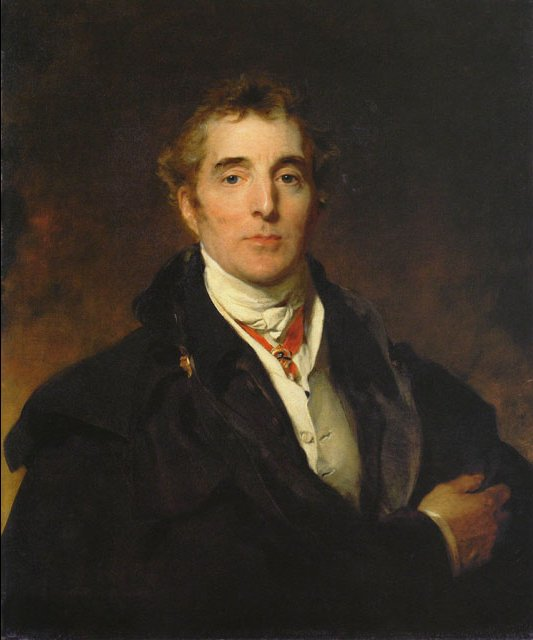
Portrait of the Duke of Wellington by Thomas Lawrence

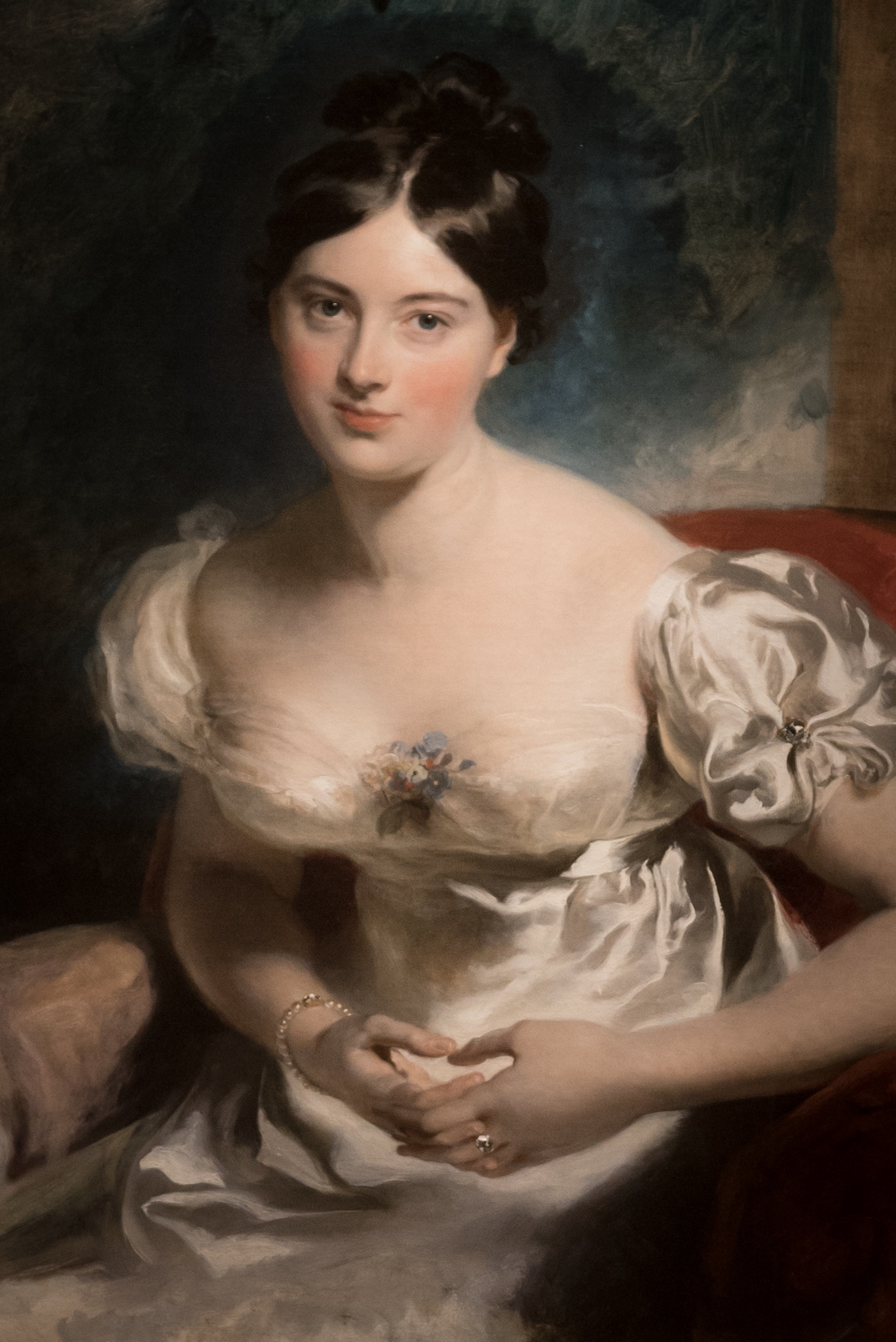
Portrait of the Countess of Blessington by Thomas Lawrence

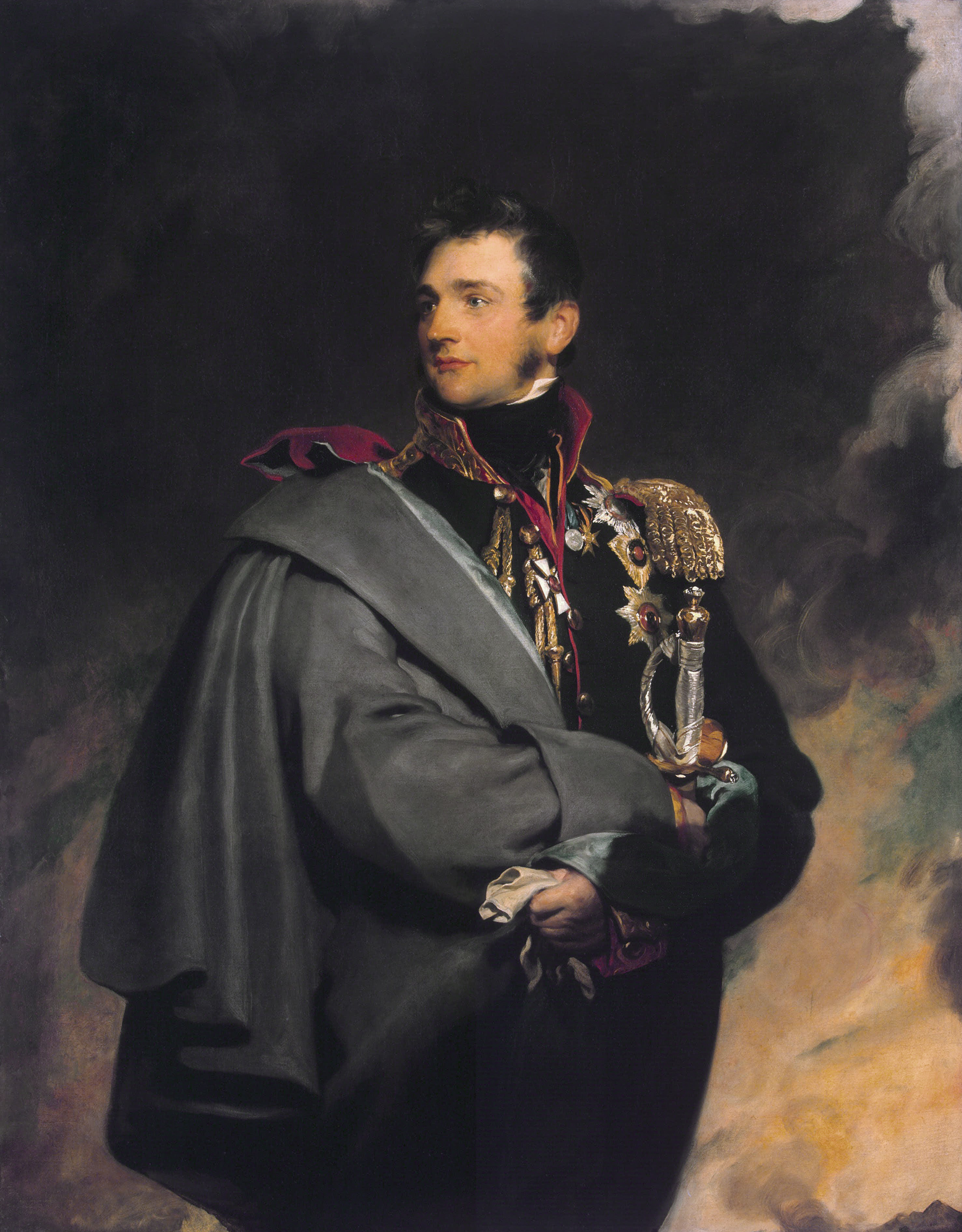
Portrait of Mikhail Vorontsov by Thomas Lawrence

Little Red Riding Hood by Thomas Lawrence

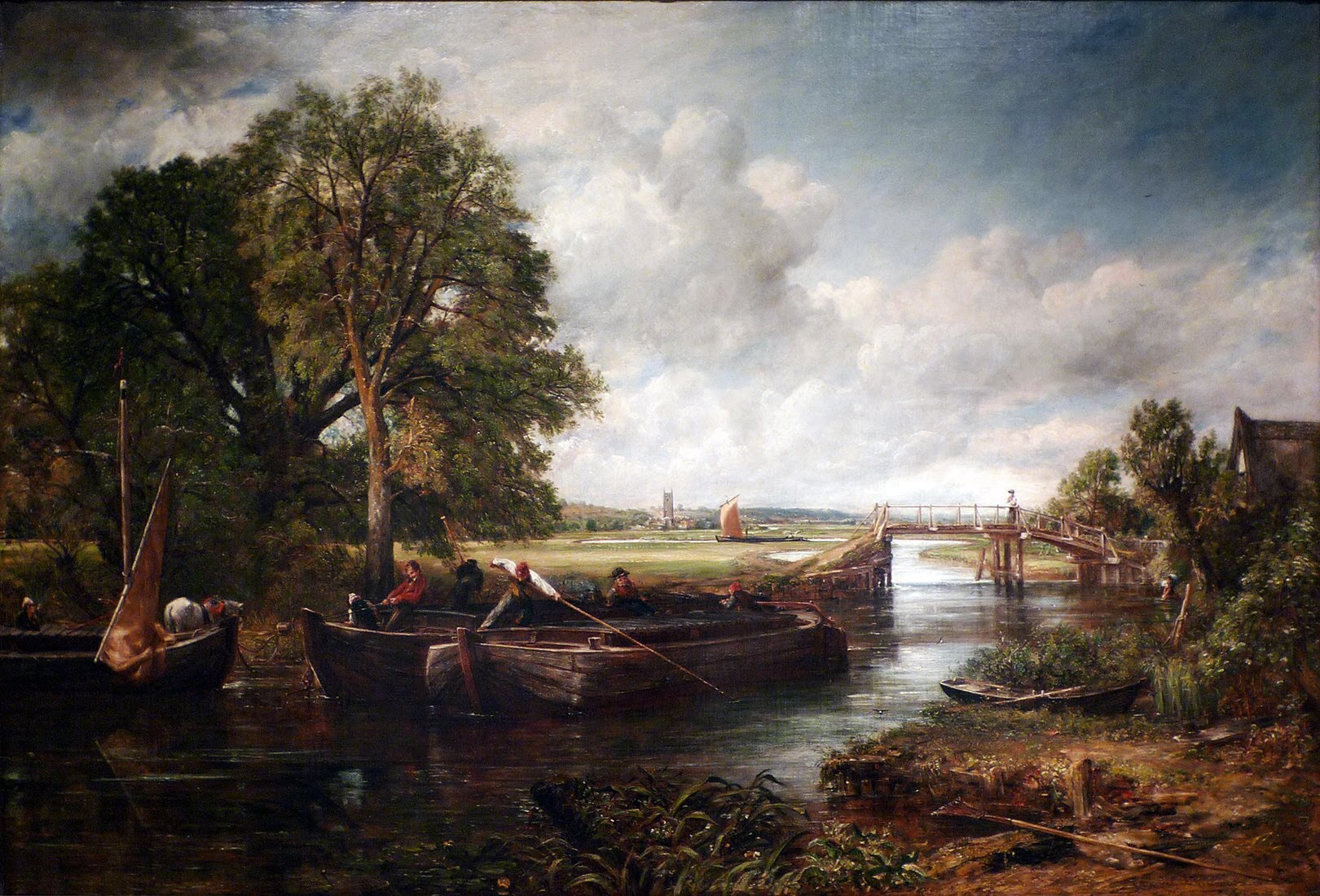
View on the Stour near Dedham by John Constable

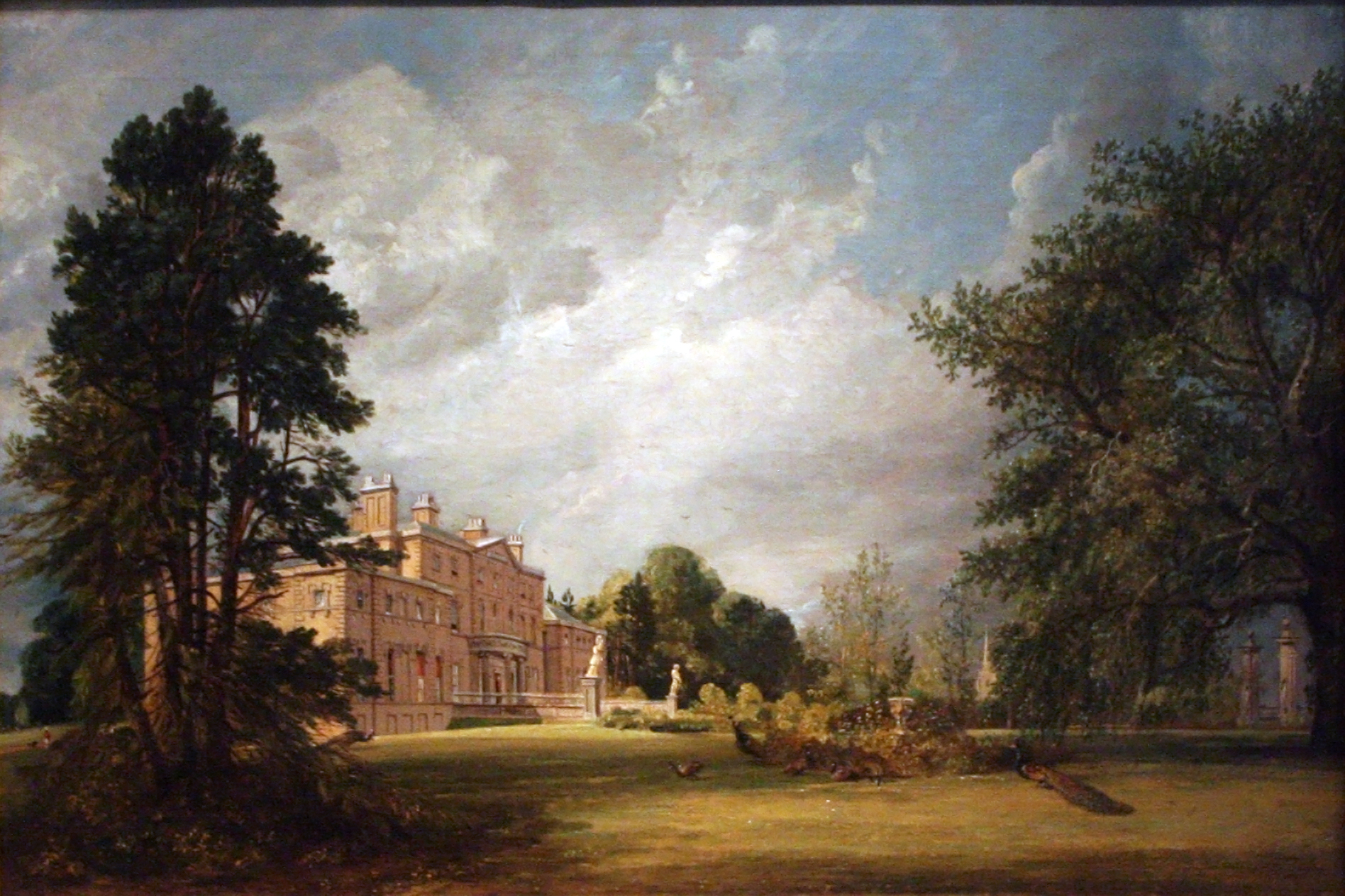
Malvern Hall by John Constable

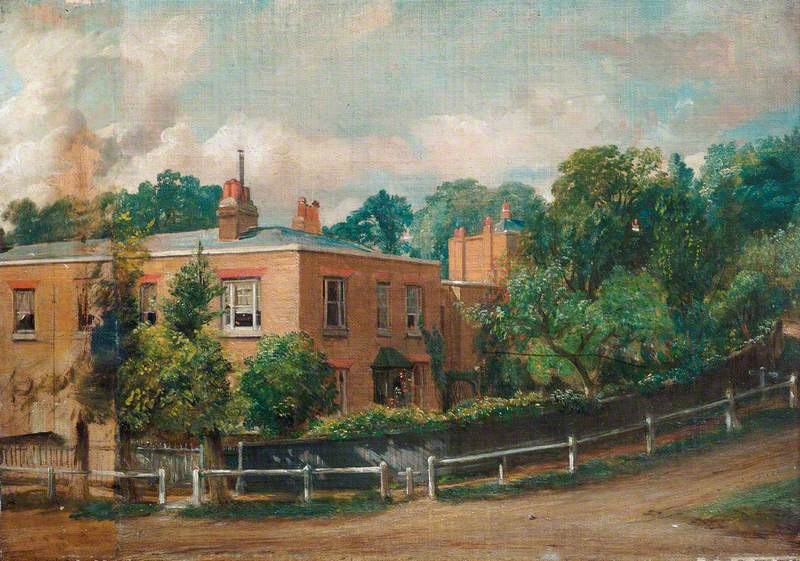
View of Lower Terrace, Hampstead by John Constable

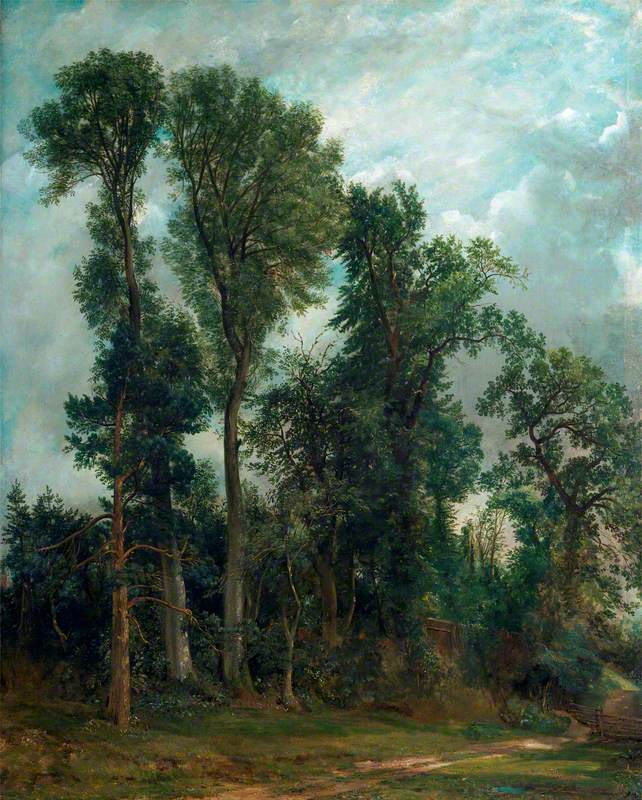
Trees at Hampstead by John Constable

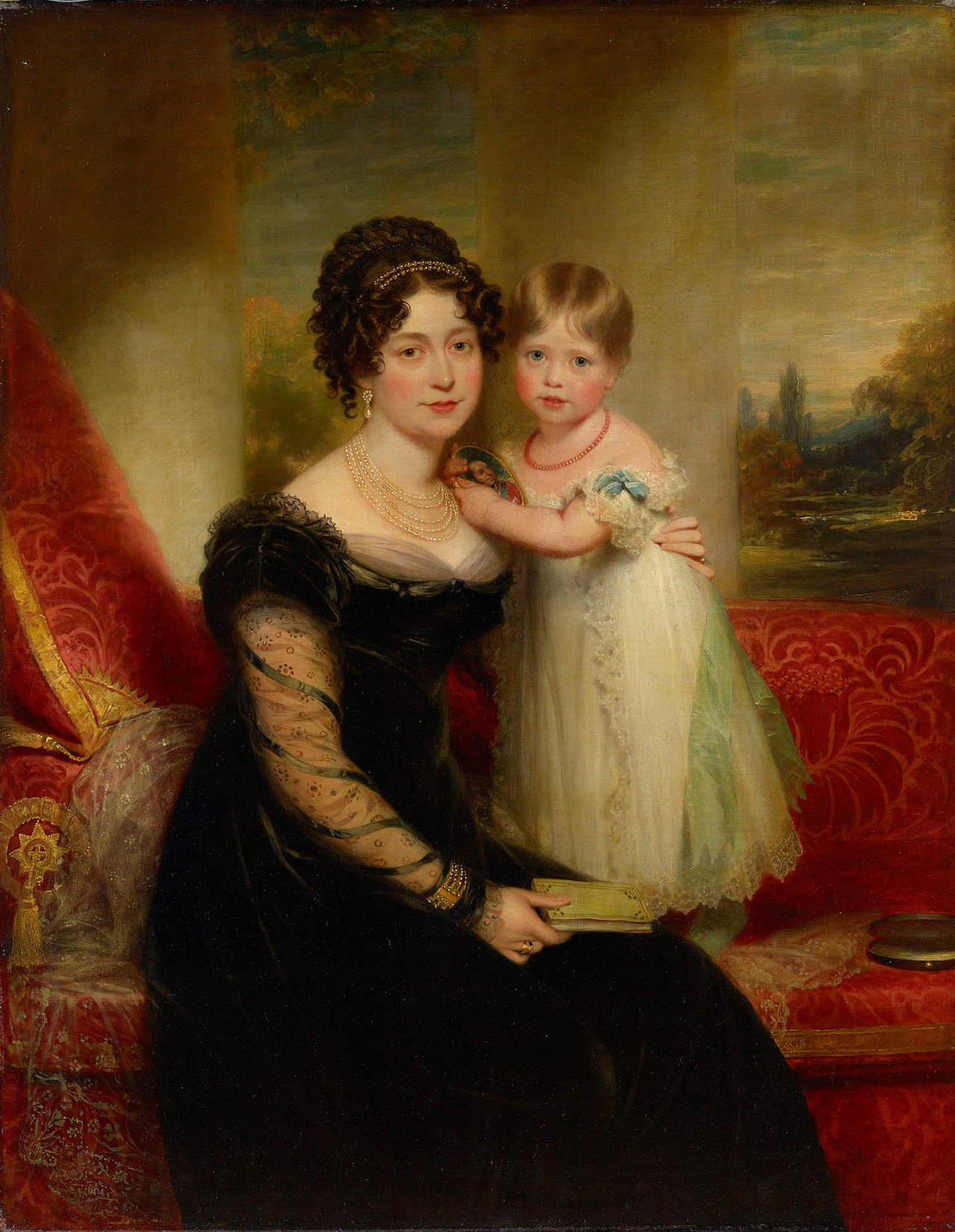
Victoria, Duchess of Kent with Princess Victoria by William Beechey

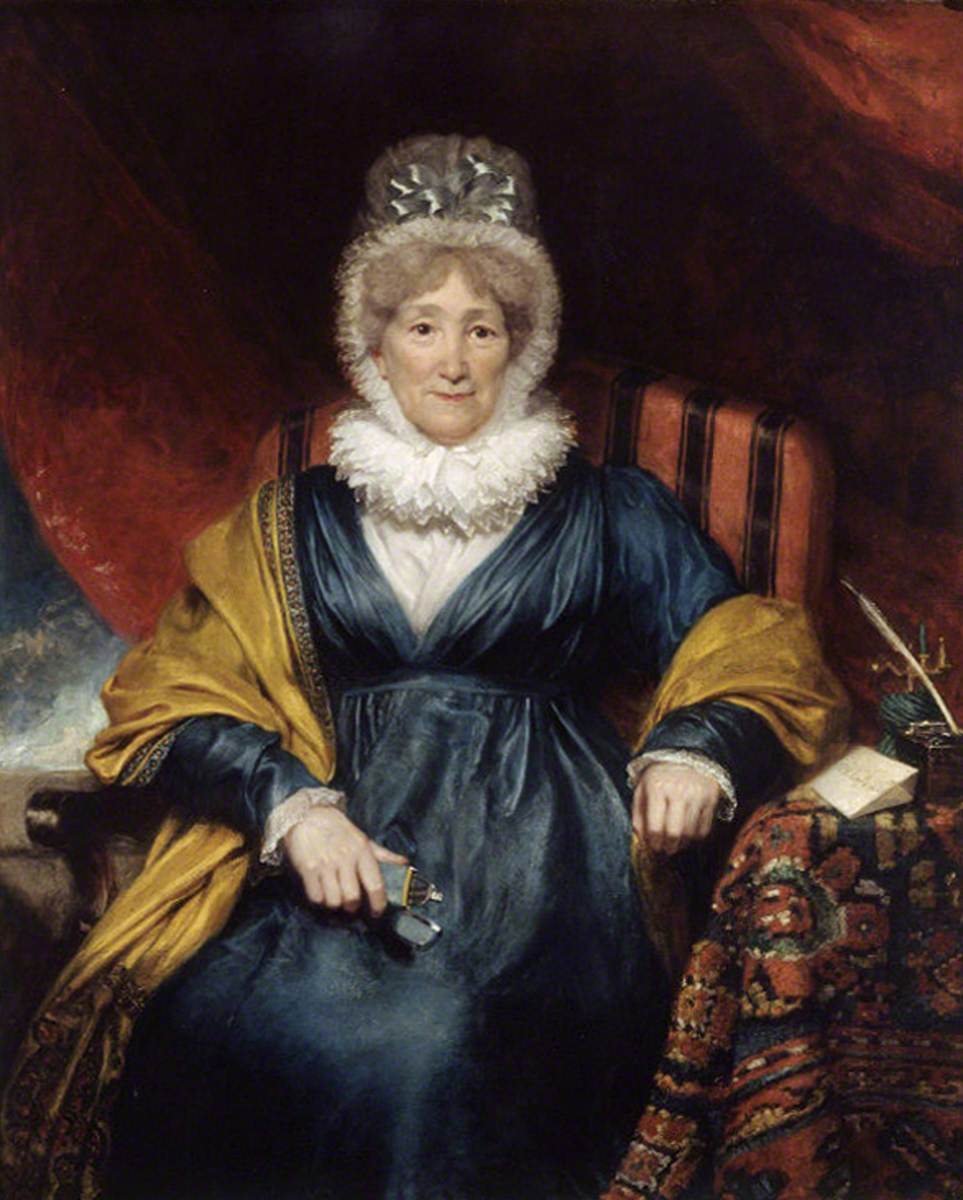
Portrait of Hannah More by Henry William Pickersgill

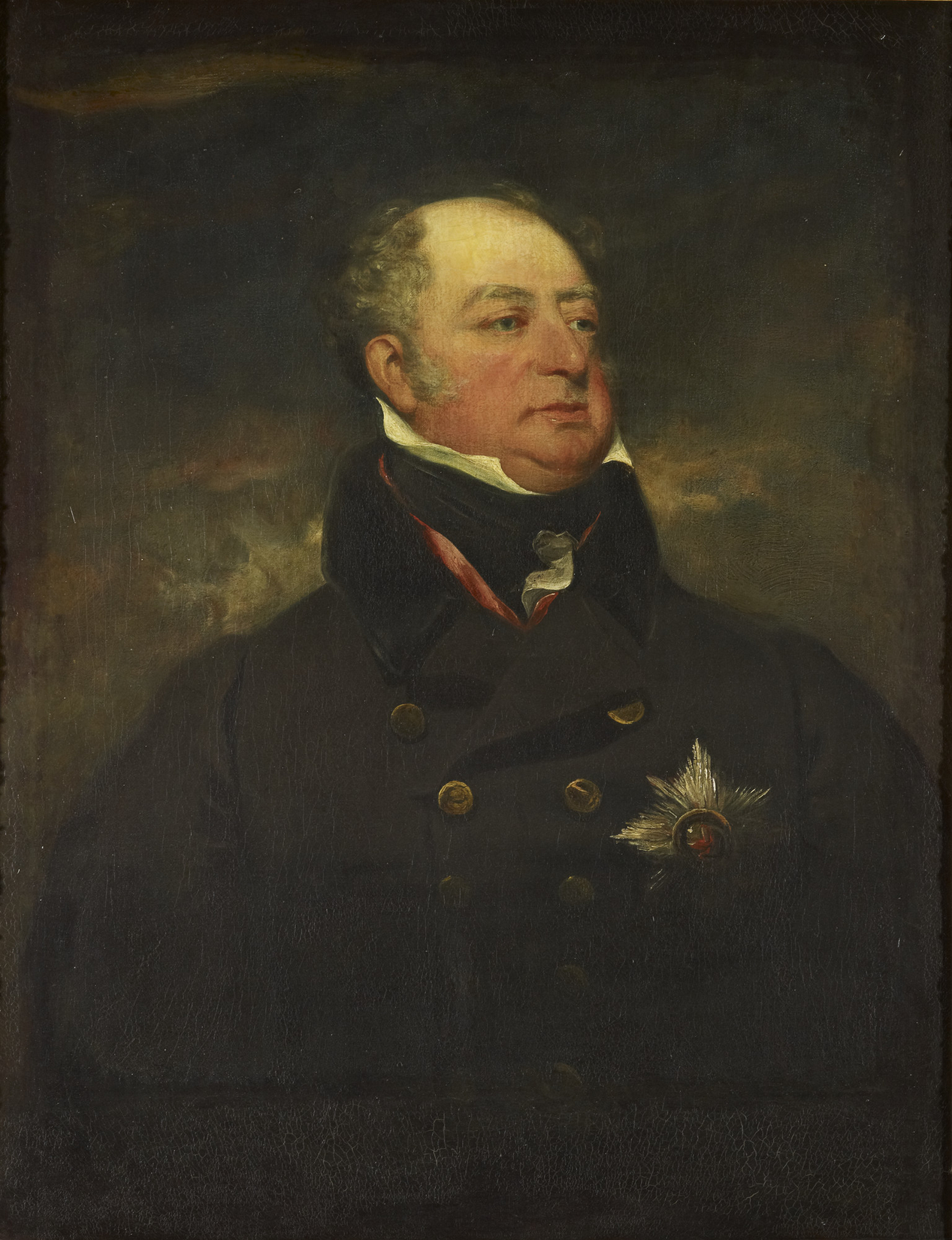
Portrait of the Duke of York by John Jackson

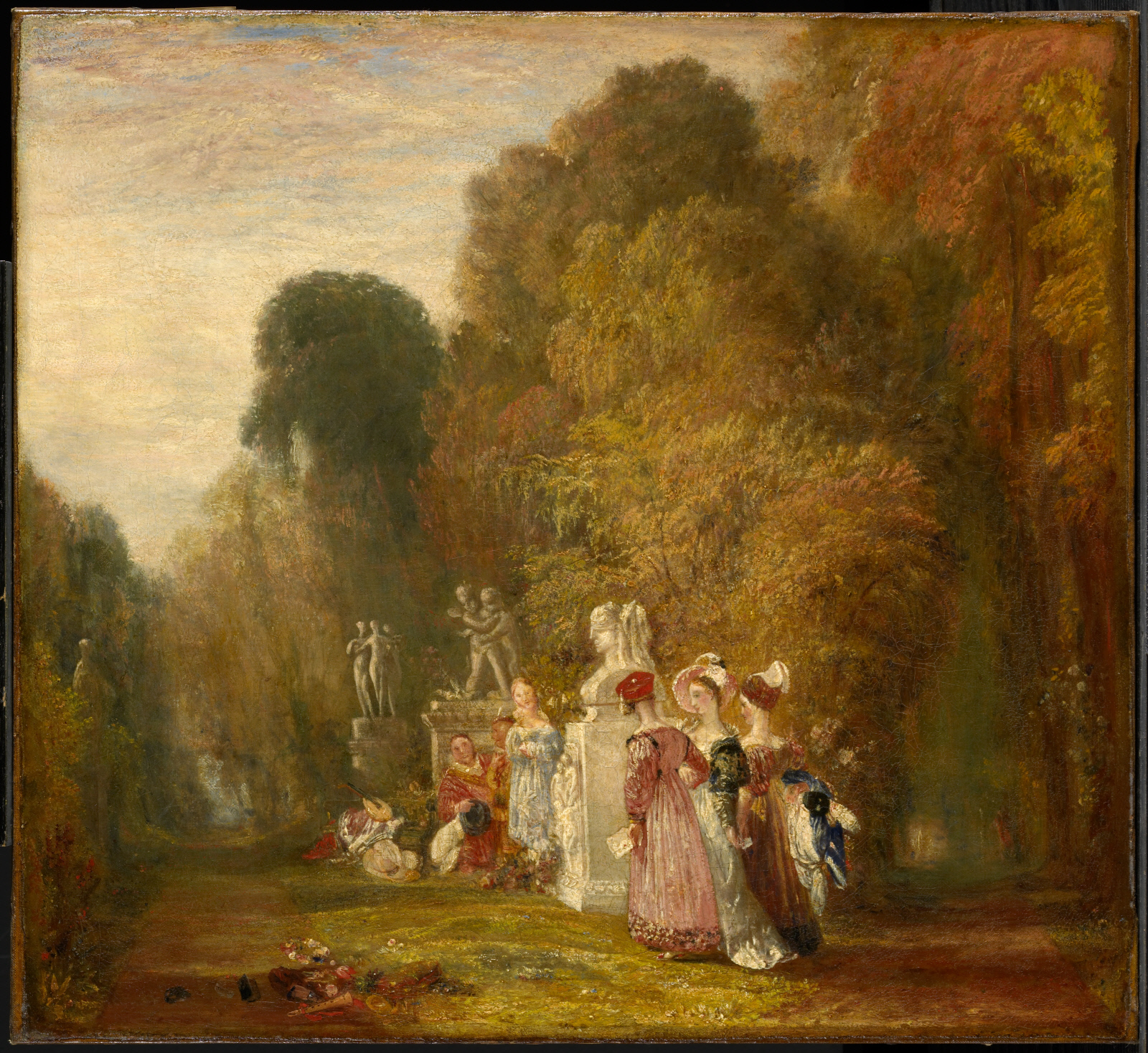
What You Will! by J.M.W. Turner

Smugglers Alarmed by Augustus Wall Callcott

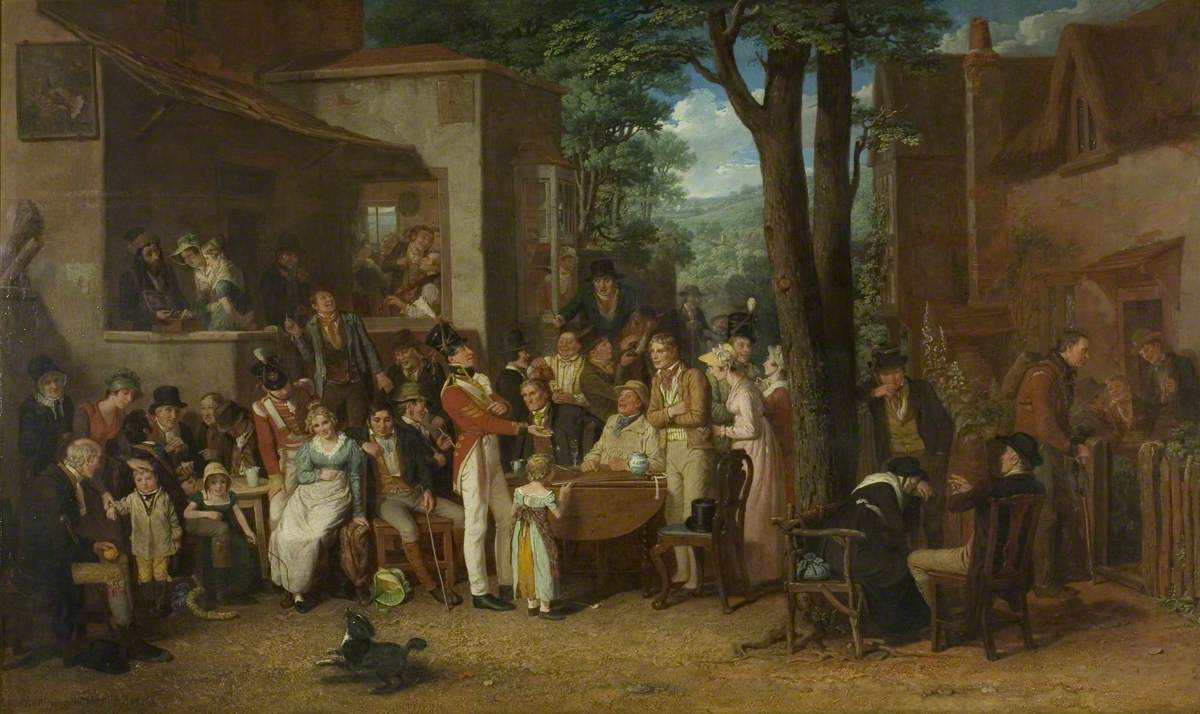
The Recruiting Party by Edward Villiers Rippingille

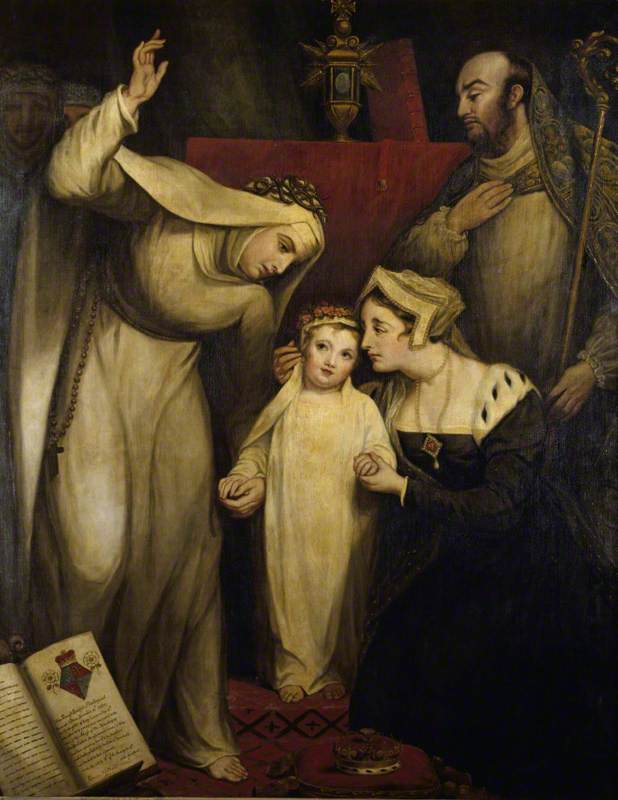
Princess Bridget Plantagenet Dedicated to the Nunnery at Dartford by James Northcote

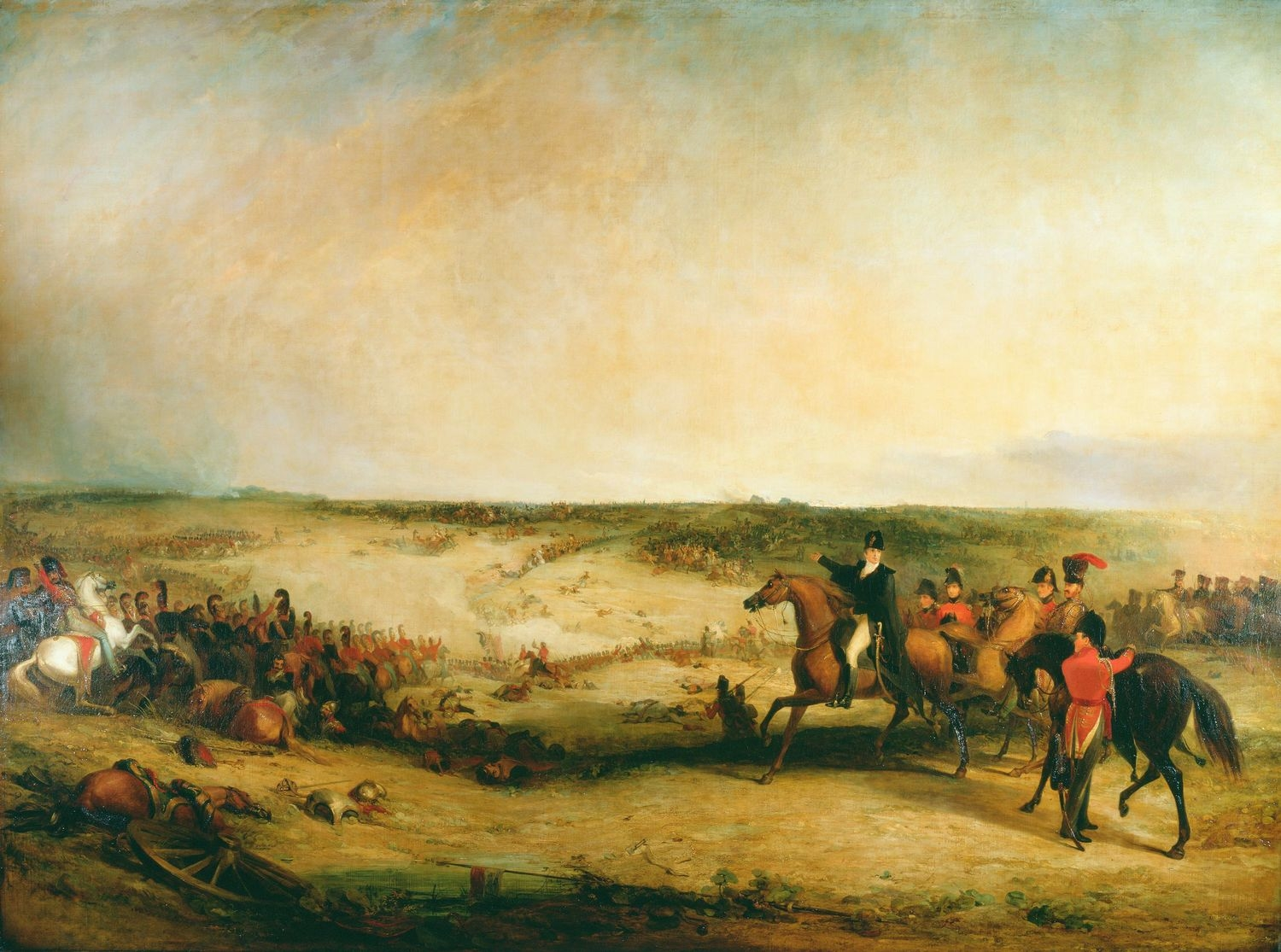
The Battle of Waterloo by George Jones

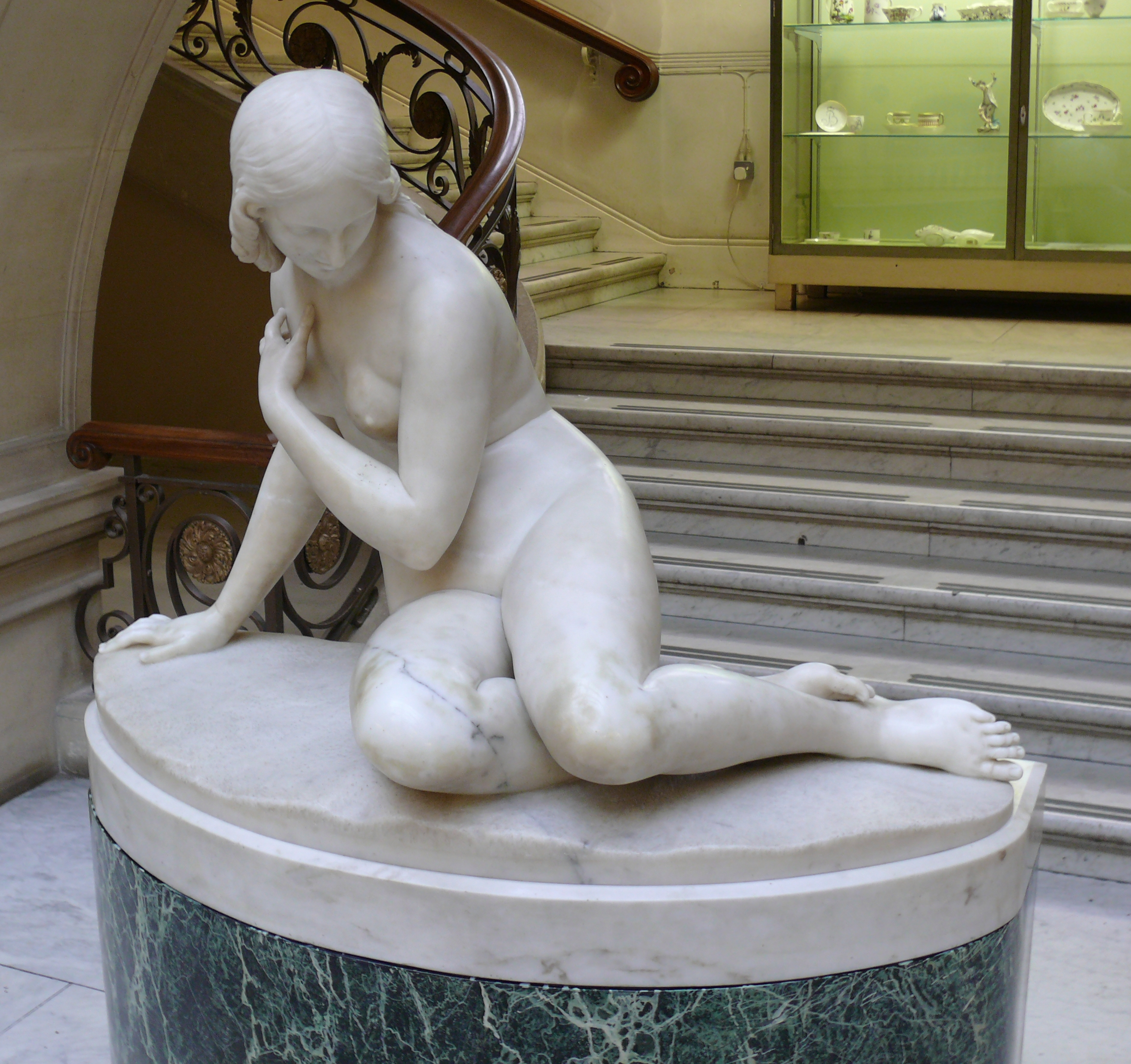
Eve at the Fountain by Edward Hodges Baily

== See also ==
- Salon of 1822, a contemporary exhibition held at the Louvre in Paris

== Bibliography ==
- Lipska, Aneta. The Travel Writings of Marguerite Blessington: The Most Gorgeous Lady on the Tour. Anthem Press, 2017.
- Murphy, Deirdre. The Young Victoria. Yale University Press, 2019.
- Noon, Patrick & Bann, Stephen. Constable to Delacroix: British Art and the French Romantics. Tate, 2003.
- Reynolds, Graham. Constable's England. Metropolitan Museum of Art, 1983.
- Tromans, Nicholas. David Wilkie: The People's Painter. Edinburgh University Press, 2007.
