= 1821 in art =

Events in the year 1821 in Art.

== Events ==
- 7 May – The Royal Academy Exhibition of 1821 opens at Somerset House in London with John Constable's The Hay Wain amongst the works on display
- At the age of eleven, Théodore Chassériau is accepted into the studio of Ingres.
- John Martin's paintings Joshua Commanding the Sun to Stand Still upon Gibeon and Belshazzar's Feast are purchased by his former employer William Collins and begin to tour.
- Birmingham Society of Artists established in England.

== Works ==
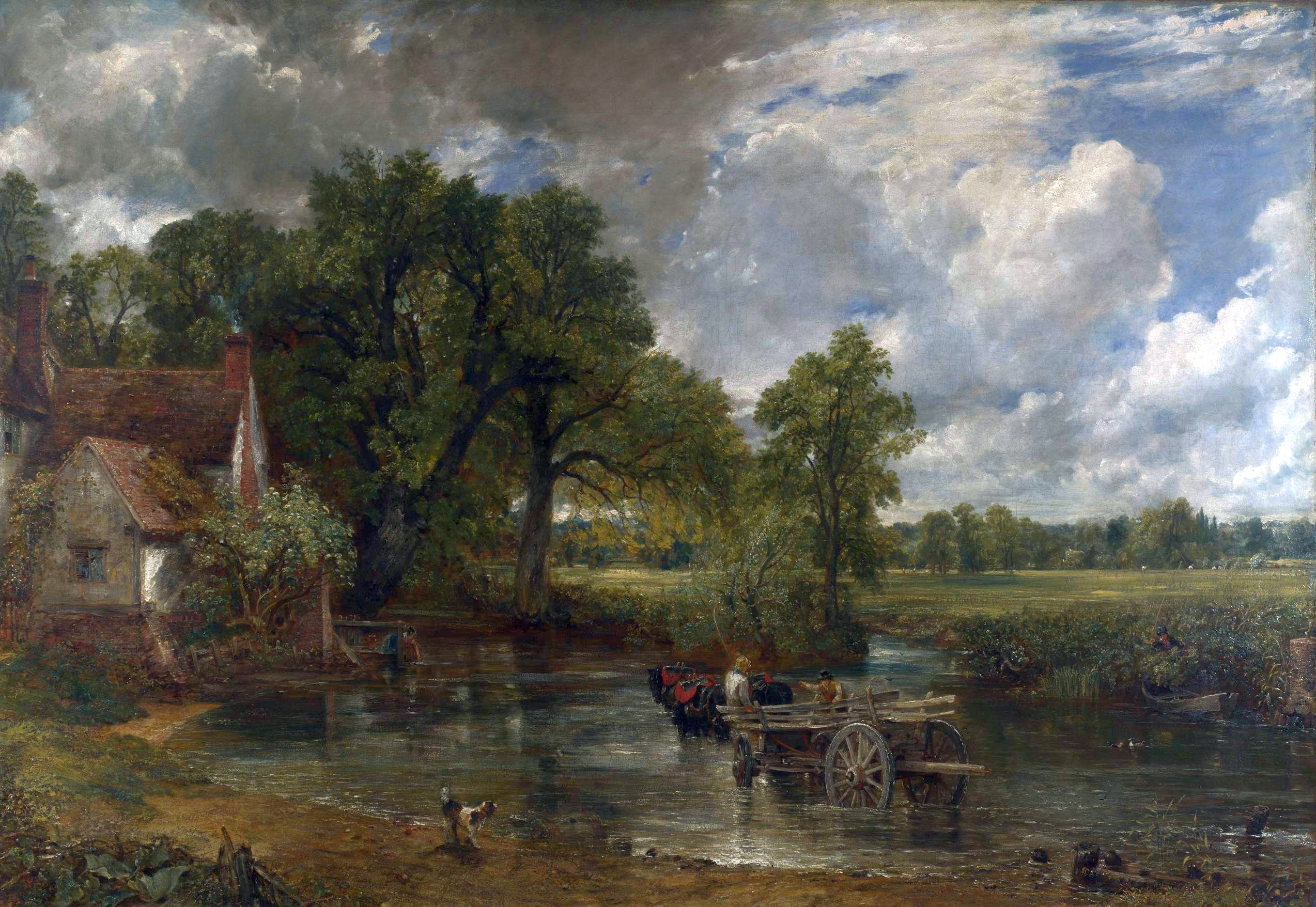
The Hay Wain by John Constable.

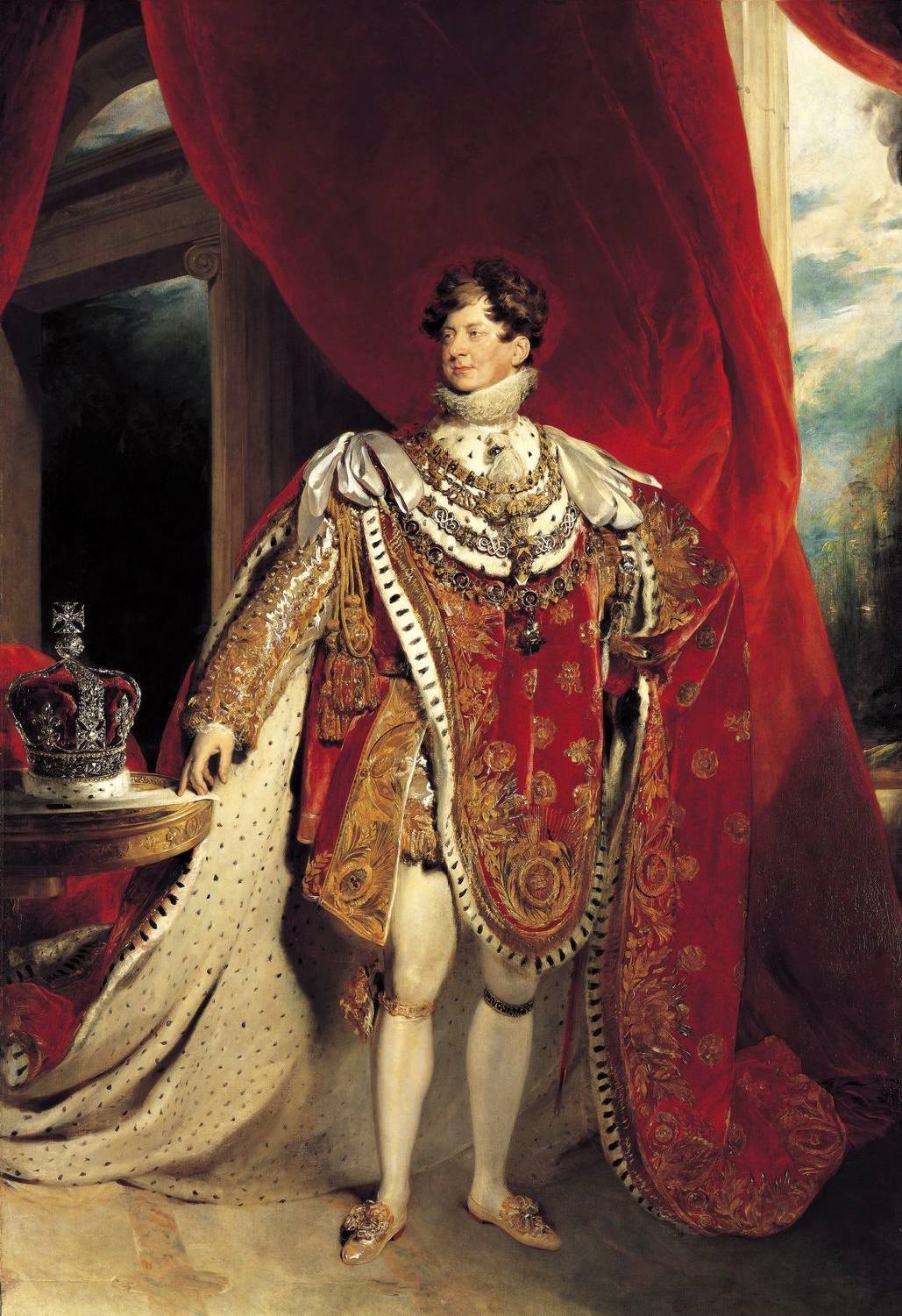
Coronation portrait of George IV by Thomas Lawrence.

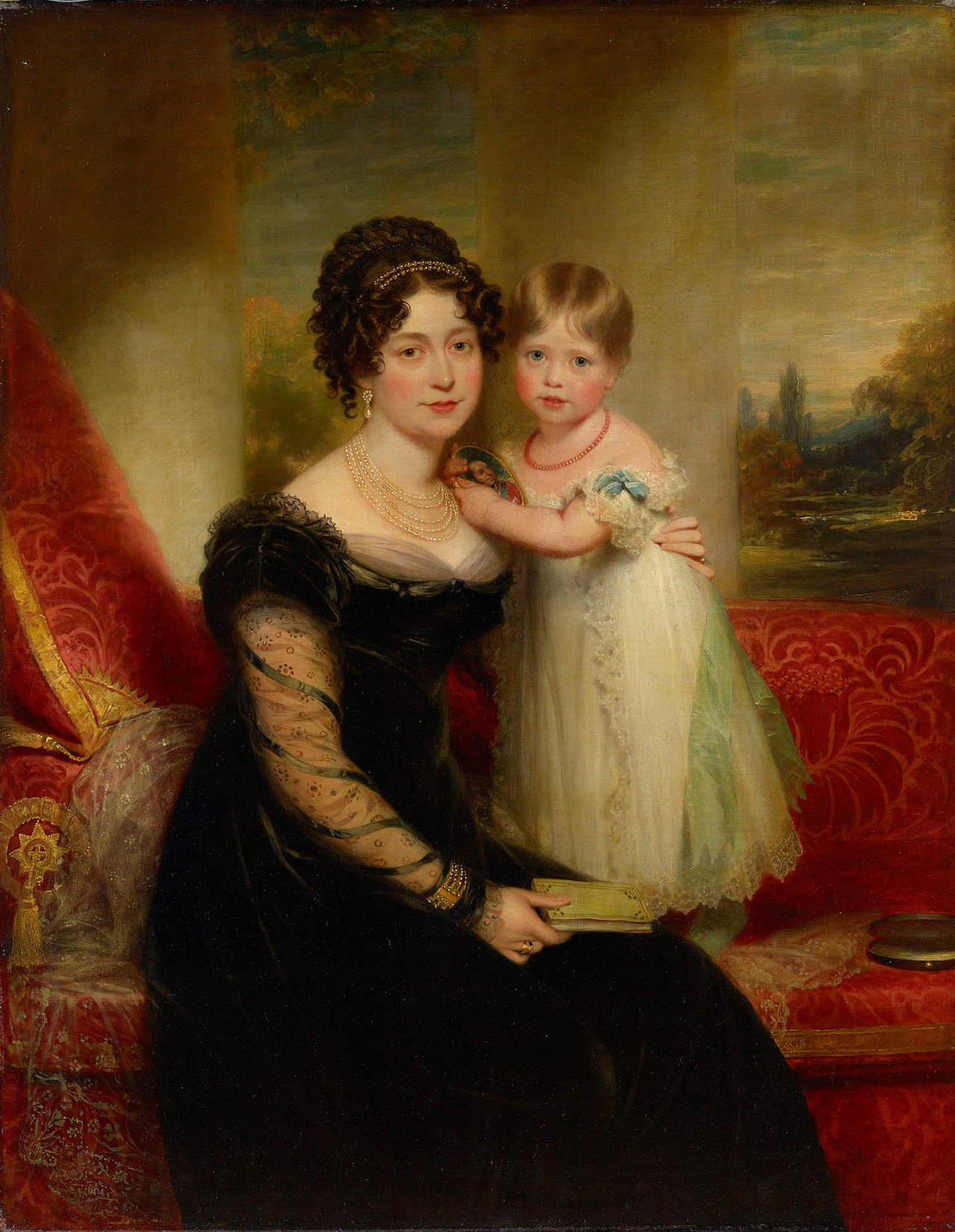
Victoria, Duchess of Kent with Princess Victoria by William Beechey.

- Lorenzo Bartolini – The Campbell Sisters Dancing a Waltz (marble)
- William Beechey – Victoria, Duchess of Kent with Princess Victoria
- John Cawse – A Soldier Relating His Exploits in a Tavern
- Francis Leggatt Chantrey – Lord Castlereagh
- John Constable
  - The Hay Wain
  - Harnham Gate, Salisbury
  - Malvern Hall
  - Trees at Hampstead
- John Crome – Yarmouth Water Frolic
- Francis Danby – Disappointed Love
- Jacques-Louis David – The Sisters Zénaïde and Charlotte Bonaparte
- Charles Deane – Waterloo Bridge and the Lambeth Waterfront from Westminster Stairs
- Charles Lock Eastlake
  - The Erechtheum, Athens
  - A View of Trajan's Forum, Rome
- William Etty – The Triumph of Cleopatra
- Théodore Géricault – The 1821 Derby at Epsom
- John Jackson – William Macready as Henry IV
- George Jones – The Village of Waterloo
- Charles Bird King – Young Omahaw, War Eagle, Little Missouri, and Pawnees
- Charles-Nicolas Lafond – The Duchess of Berry Presenting the Duke of Bordeaux
- Thomas Lawrence
  - Portrait of George IV
  - Portrait of Mikhail Vorontsov
  - Portrait of Sir Humphry Davy
- Bertel Thorvaldsen – Lion Monument, Lucerne
- John Trumbull – Surrender of General Burgoyne
- William Turner – George IV Entering Dublin
- Horace Vernet
  - The Artist's Studio
  - The Battle of Jemappes
  - Napoleon's Tomb
  - Portrait of Marshal Saint-Cyr
- David Wilkie – Newsmongers

== Births ==
- January 27 – August Becker, German landscape painter (died 1887)
- February 10 - Roberto Bompiani, Italian painter (died 1908)
- February 26 – Félix Ziem, French painter (died 1911)
- March 9 – Napoleon Sarony, Canadian American portrait photographer (died 1896)
- April 16 – Ford Madox Brown, English painter (died 1893)
- April 21 – Philip Henry Delamotte, English pioneer photographer (died 1889)
- April 26 – Robert Adamson, Scottish pioneer photographer (died 1848)
- June 18 – Théophile Schuler, French painter and illustrator (died 1878)
- August 4 – Louis Vuitton, French fashion designer (died 1892)
- August 28 – Thomas Seddon, English-born landscape painter (died 1856)
- September 9 – James Smetham, English painter (died 1889)
- October 13 – Évariste Vital Luminais, French historical painter (died 1896)
- November 23 – Charles Meryon, French etcher (died 1868)
- Robert S. Duncanson, African American landscape painter (died 1872)
- date unknown – Mario Raggi, Italian sculptor (died 1907)

== Deaths ==
- February 12 – Albertus Jonas Brandt, Dutch still-life painter (born 1788)
- February 24 – Marie-Anne Collot, French sculptor (born 1748)
- March 9 – Nicholas Pocock, English marine painter (born 1740)
- April 18 – Thomas Baxter, English porcelain painter (born 1782)
- April 22 – John Crome, English artist in the Romantic era (born 1768)
- May 27 – Charles Alfred Stothard, English historical draughtsman (born 1786)
- July 4 – Richard Cosway, English portrait painter (born 1742)
- August 19 – Marie-Denise Villers, French painter specializing in portraits (born 1774)
- August 21 – Adam Bartsch, Austrian scholar, artist, and printmaker in engraving and etching (born 1757)
- September 10 – Johann Dominicus Fiorillo, German painter and art historian (born 1748)
- date unknown
  - Gaetano Stefano Bartolozzi, Italian engraver, art dealer, and merchant (born 1757)
  - Yi In-mun, Korean court painter of the late Joseon Dynasty, primarily of landscapes (born 1745)
- probable – Luigi Agricola, Italian painter and jeweller (born c. 1750)
