= Macready as Werner =

Painting by Daniel Maclise

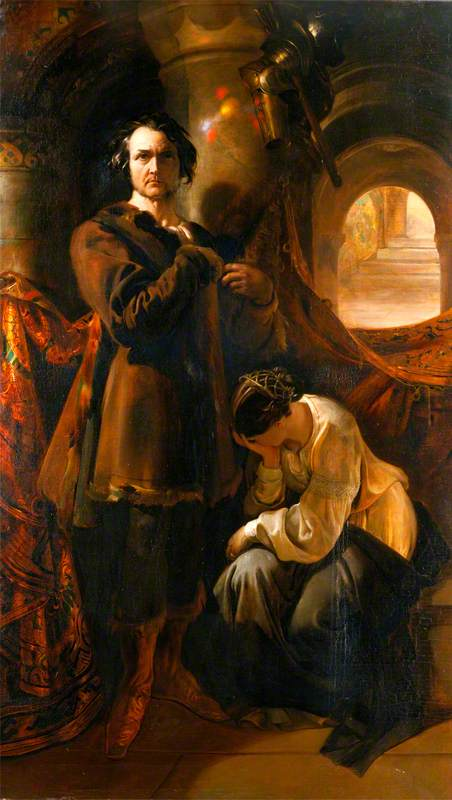
- Artist: Daniel Maclise
- Year: 1850
- Type: Oil on canvas, portrait painting
- Dimensions: 174 cm × 100.3 cm (69 in × 39.5 in)
- Location: Victoria and Albert Museum, London

Macready as Werner is an 1850 portrait painting by the Irish artist Daniel Maclise. It depicts the celebrated English stage actor William Macready in the role of Werner, the title character from an 1822 play by Lord Byron. Macready has been a leading actor in the West End since the Regency era. Maclise was a Cork-born painter known for his pictures depicting scenes from British history. The painting was displayed at the Royal Academy Exhibition of 1851 at the National Gallery. The work was commissioned by the art collector John Forester, it was donated by him to the Victoria and Albert Museum in South Kensington in 1876. An 1852 engraving was produced by Charles William Sharpe based on the painting, a copy of which is now in the National Portrait Gallery.

== Bibliography ==
- Ormond, Richard. Early Victorian Portraits: Text. H.M. Stationery Office, 1974.
- Roe, Sonia. Oil Paintings in Public Ownership in the Victoria and Albert Museum. Public Catalogue Foundation, 2008.
- Wright, Christopher, Gordon, Catherine May & Smith, Mary Peskett. British and Irish Paintings in Public Collections: An Index of British and Irish Oil Paintings by Artists Born Before 1870 in Public and Institutional Collections in the United Kingdom and Ireland. Yale University Press, 2006.
- Young, Alan R. Hamlet and the visual arts, 1709-1900. University of Delaware Press, 2002.

== See also ==
- William Macready as Henry IV, an 1821 portrait by John Jackson
