= Cumberland Terrace =

Grade I listed terrace in London

Coordinates: 51.5322°N 0.1464°W

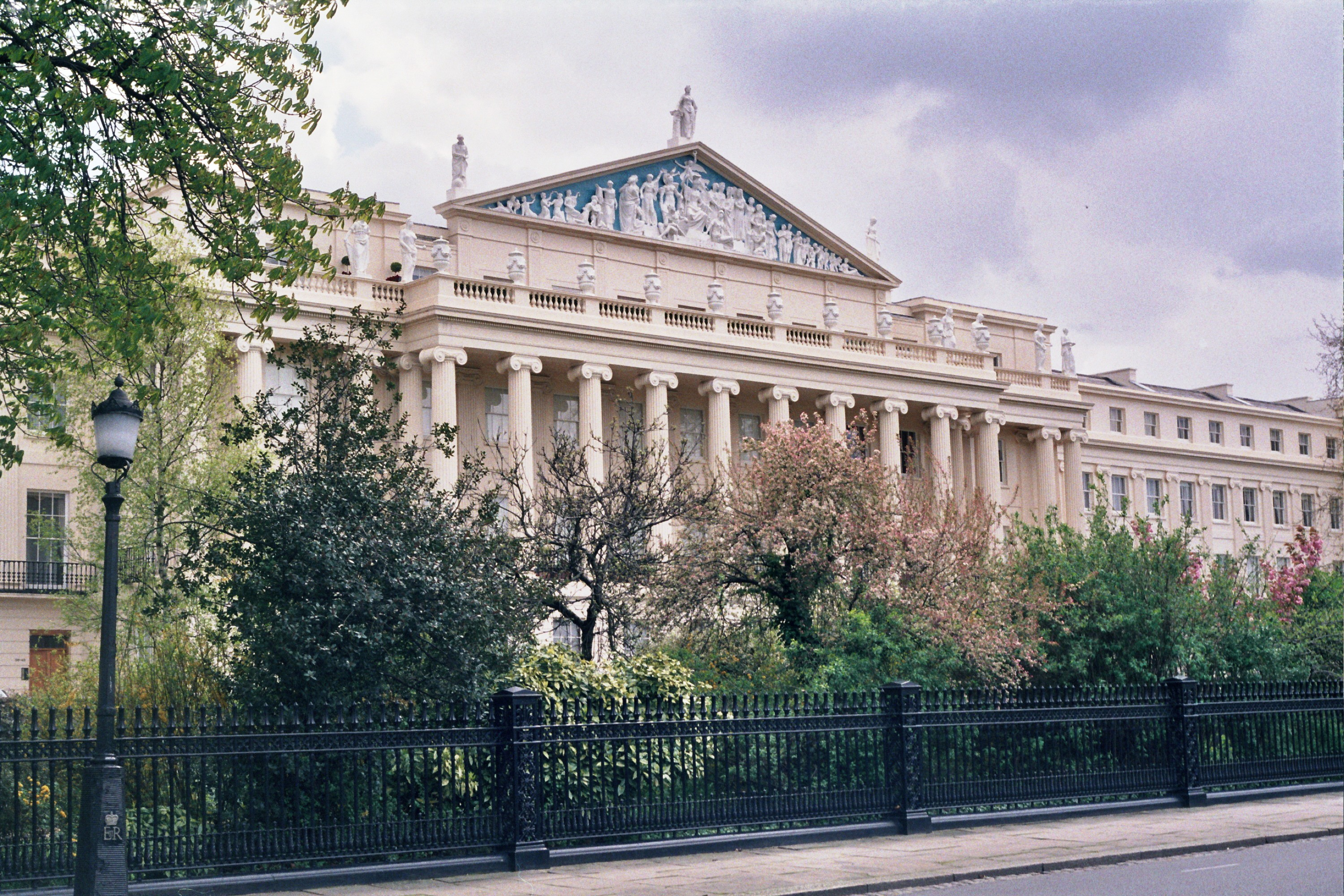
Cumberland Terrace

Cumberland Terrace is a neoclassical terrace on the eastern side of Regent's Park in the London Borough of Camden, completed in 1826. It is a Grade I listed building.

== History ==
It was one of several terraces and crescents around Regent's Park designed by the British architect John Nash (1752–1835), under the patronage of the Prince Regent (later George IV). The terrace was to stand opposite the Prince's proposed palace in the park and was therefore of particular importance in the scheme. It was named after the Prince Regent's brother, the Duke of Cumberland (King George III's younger son), later King of Hanover.

The Terrace was built by William Mountford Nurse, with James Thomson serving as resident architect, and was completed in 1826. It consists of three main blocks, linked by decorative arches with typical neoclassical style and grandeur. The central block includes a large sculptural pediment by J. G. Bubb above a long colonnade of Ionic columns. Originally comprising 31 houses which were entirely reconstructed behind the original façade in the 1960s, some have been converted into flats but many houses are still separate family homes.

During the Second World War the Nash buildings around the park, including Cumberland Terrace, fell into what one newspaper called "a sad state of neglect … caused by bombing and the ravages of time". An official report commented "there is not a single terrace which does not give the impression of hopeless dereliction". In the early 1950s restoration work restored the portico of Cumberland Terrace to "its former glory". The terrace was mainly occupied by government departments during and after the war, and in the 1950s there was a short-lived proposal to turn the whole terrace into a hall of residence for the University of London. By 1957 the freeholder of the terrace, the Crown Estate, had adopted the policy of returning it, and the other Nash terraces, to private residential use, as recommended ten years earlier in the report of a government committee on the post-war future of the terraces.

== Notable residents ==
The first resident, William Mountford Nurse himself, moved into the terrace in 1828; the building was not fully occupied until 1836.

Another early resident was the art collector Henry Vaughan, who lived at no. 28 from 1834 until his death in 1899. He gave The Hay Wain to the National Gallery after enjoying it at home for some twenty years.

In the 1920s and 1930s the pianist Mark Hambourg lived at 27 Cumberland Terrace with his wife, the violinist Dorothea Muir Mackenzie and their four daughters, including the pianist Michal Hambourg. Other residents of the terrace included the actresses Gladys Cooper and Fay Compton. Wallis Simpson moved into No 16 in 1936 after leaving her husband. Among those born in Cumberland Terrace were the theatre manager Sir Bronson Albery, the teacher and historian Oscar Browning, the author Daphne du Maurier (at the house, no. 24, of her father, the actor Gerald du Maurier) and the playwright Gertrude Jennings.

== See also ==
- List of eponymous roads in London
