= Burlington Fine Arts Club =

London gentlemen's club

Coordinates: 51.5112°N 0.1405°W

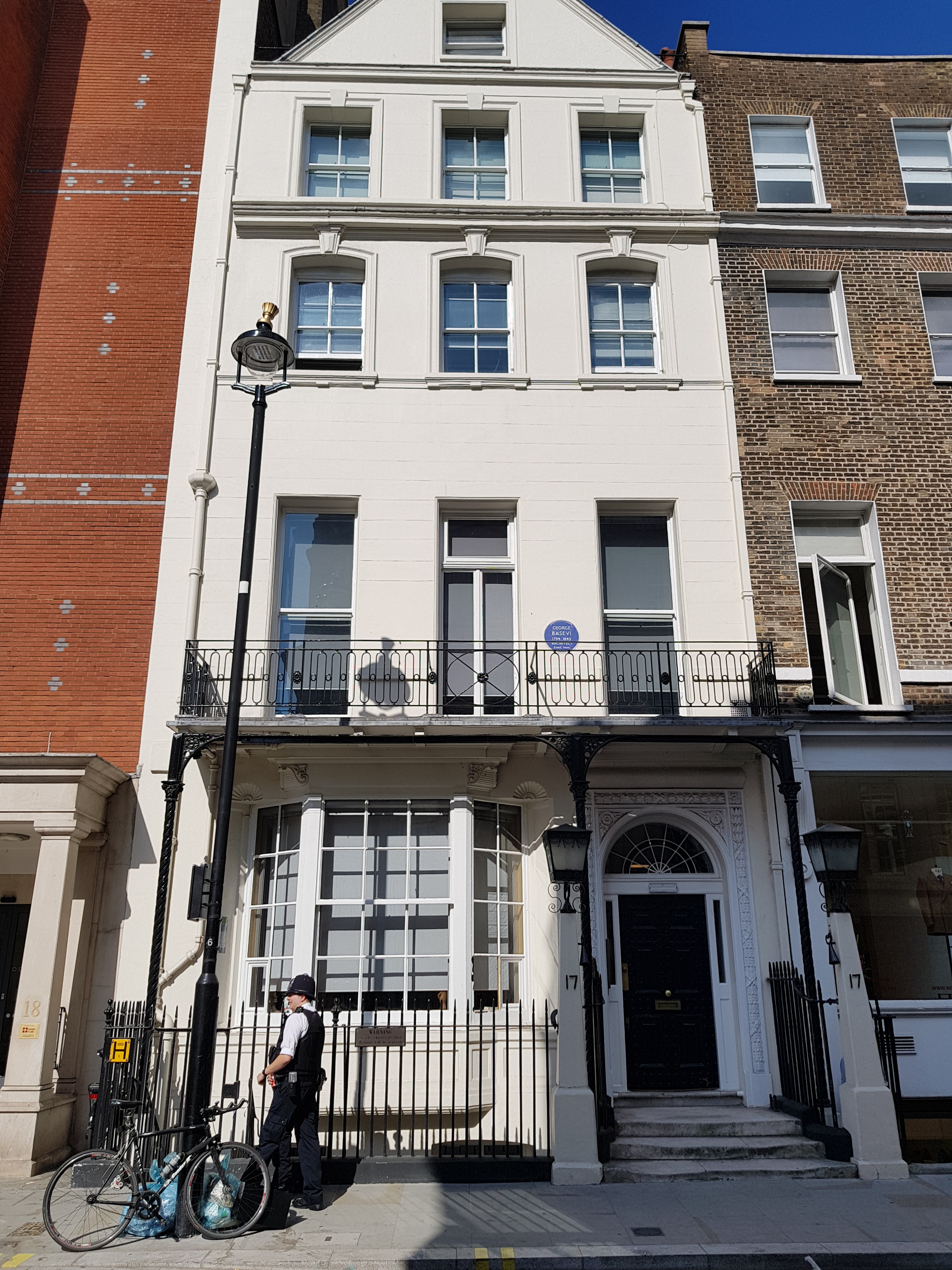
17 Savile Row

The Burlington Fine Arts Club (established 1866; dissolved 1952) was a London gentlemen's club based at 17 Savile Row.

The club had its roots in the informal Fine Arts Club, a gathering of amateur art enthusiasts, founded by John Charles Robinson, that met in Marlborough House in 1856, moving to South Kensington from 1857. In 1866 they formalised the new club, although informal meetings under the Fine Arts Club banner continued to be held separately until 1874, using the Burlington as its base.

The original Burlington clubhouse occupied the upper three floors of 177 Piccadilly from 1866 until 1869, when the club moved to its Savile Row premises, where it remained for the rest of its existence. The club aimed to evoke the atmosphere of a typical gentlemen's club for those interested in art, as well as to provide a showcase for amateur artists. Part of the clubhouse doubled as a regular exhibition venue, the location having been selected for its proximity to Mayfair art dealers.

Notable members included James McNeill Whistler, John Ruskin, Dante Gabriel Rossetti, William Michael Rossetti, Edwin Lutyens and the art collector Henry Vaughan who gave Constable's The Hay Wain to the nation.

The Second World War proved a terrible strain on the Burlington, its last exhibition having been held just prior to the outbreak of war in 1939. With dwindling membership numbers after the war, the club's committee realised that it could no longer afford the lease on its clubhouse. An attempt was made to raise the funds to move to 34 Great Cumberland Place, but this failed. In late 1951, the committee voted for the club to go into liquidation, with effect the following year.

The club's assets were valued at some £14,500. With most of the members waiving their rights to shares in the club, £13,070, 12s, 5d went to the National Art-Collections Fund (later the Art Fund) in commemoration of the Burlington Fine Arts Club.

== See also ==
- List of London's gentlemen's clubs
- Stacey J. Pierson, Private Collecting, Exhibitions, and the Shaping of Art History in London: The Burlington Fine Arts Club (The Histories of Material Culture and Collecting, 1700–1950) Routledge, 2017. ISBN 978-1138232624
