= Royal Academy Exhibition of 1821 =

1821 art exhibition in London

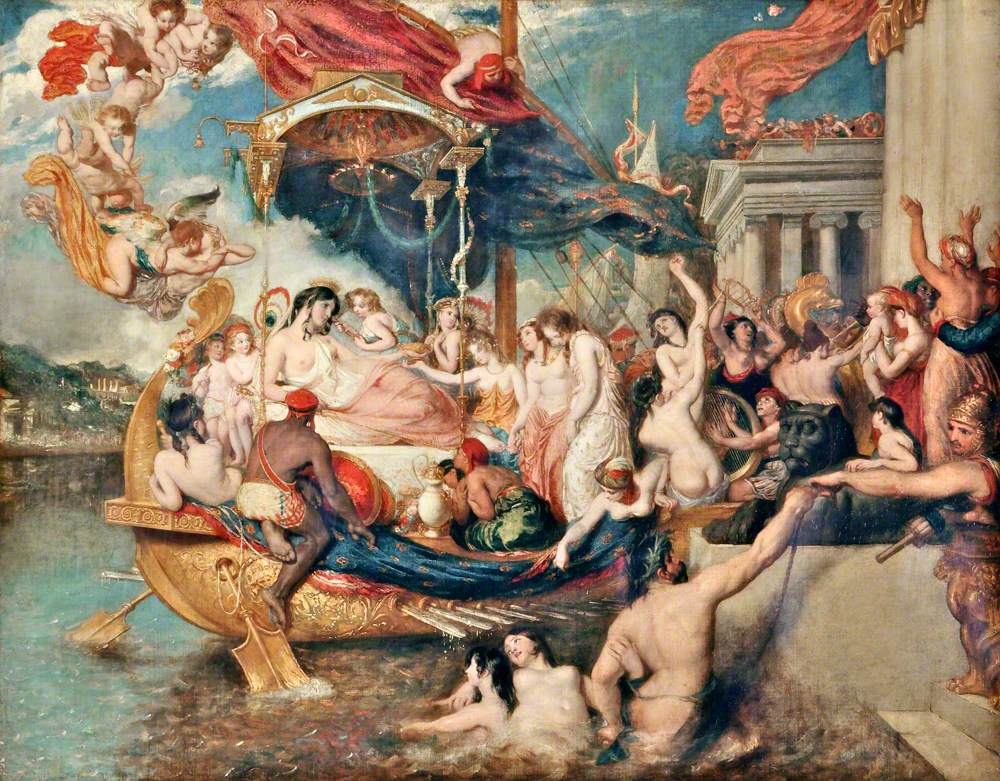
The Triumph of Cleopatra by William Etty eclipsed Constable's nearby The Hay Wain in interest during the Exhibition

The Royal Academy Exhibition of 1821 was an art exhibition held at Somerset House in London from 7 May to 14 July 1821. It was the Summer Exhibition of the Royal Academy of Arts. The exhibition featured many prominent painters, sculptors and architects and was open to submissions to non-Academy members and artists from abroad. J.M.W. Turner was a notable absentee, he did not submit any paintings that year. Today the exhibition is remembered for John Constable's The Hay Wain and the lack of interest it generated.

== Exhibition ==
The private view took place on 4 May and the annual banquet the following day. There was a danger of the event being overshadowed by the huge popularity of Belshazzar's Feast by John Martin which had been shown at the rival British Institution until shortly before the Exhibition opened. Two paintings that drew particular attention were William Hilton's Nature Blowing Bubbles for Her Children and William Etty's The Triumph of Cleopatra.

Thomas Lawrence who had been elected President of the Royal Academy the previous year displayed portrait paintings of the Foreign Secretary Lord Castlereagh and Princess Charlotte. Lawrence also presented his Portrait of Sir Humphry Davy featuring the President of the Royal Society Humphry Davy with whom he took part in the ceremony of Coronation of George IV shortly after the Exhibition closed. The Scottish painter Henry Raeburn exhibited his Portrait of the Marquess of Bute. John Jackson submitted a portrait of the stage actor William Macready as Macbeth.

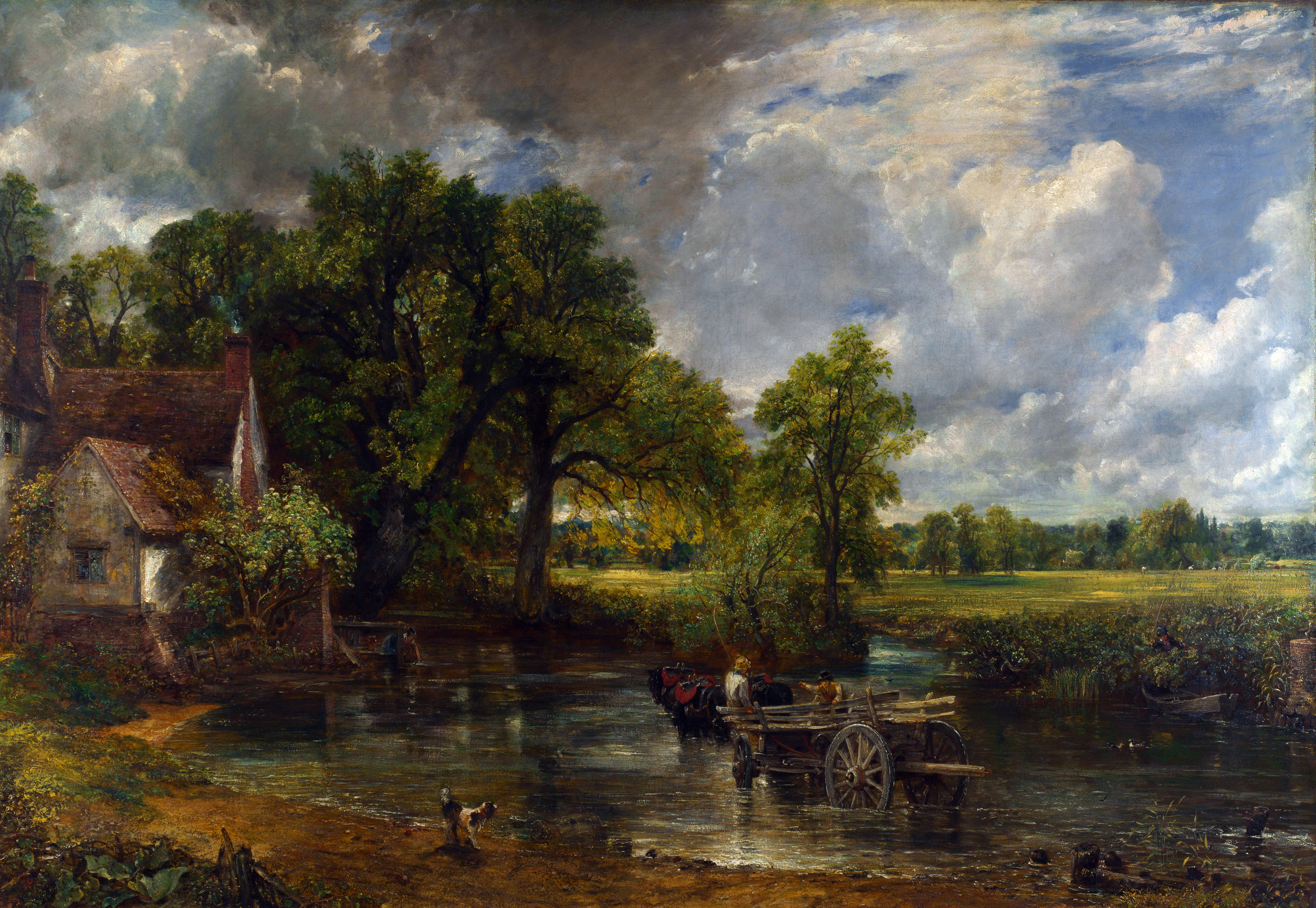
The Hay Wain by John Constable

David Wilkie displayed two genre paintings Newsmongers and Guess my Name. Andrew Geddes exhibited a now-lost large Rembrandtesque group portrait The Discovery of the Regalia of Scotland featuring Walter Scott and others discovering the Honours of Scotland in Edinburgh Castle in 1818. William Collins presented a view of Borrowdale in Cumberland. The young specialists in animal paintings Edwin Landseer also featured at the exhibition. Charles Robert Leslie showed a history piece May Day in the Reign of Queen Elizabeth while William Mulready displayed the genre work The Careless Messenger Detected.

=== The Hay Wain ===
The Suffolk-born John Constable displayed the landscape painting The Hay Wain under its original title of Landscape: Noon. It portrays a scene on the River Stour near Flatford Mill in what is now known as Constable Country, but attracted very little attention. This was possibly due to it being hung in an unfavourable location in the Academy School rather than the main room, although Etty's The Triumph of Cleopatra was also hanging there and received widespread coverage.

The painting remained unsold at the end of the exhibition and Constable displayed it again at the British Institution the following year where it was bought by the French art dealer John Arrowsmith who then entered it into the Salon of 1824 in Paris to widespread acclaim.

== Gallery ==
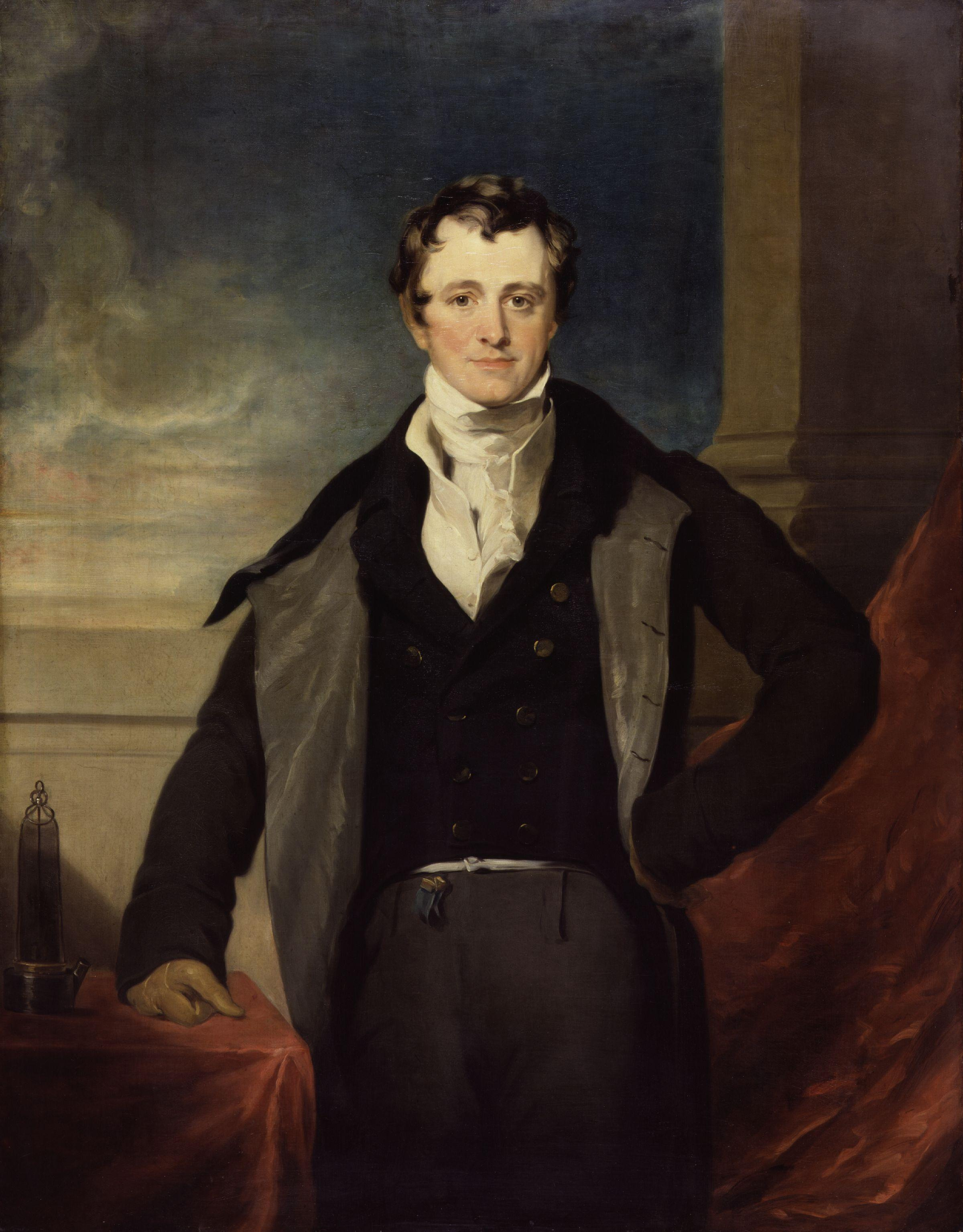
Portrait of Sir Humphry Davy by Thomas Lawrence

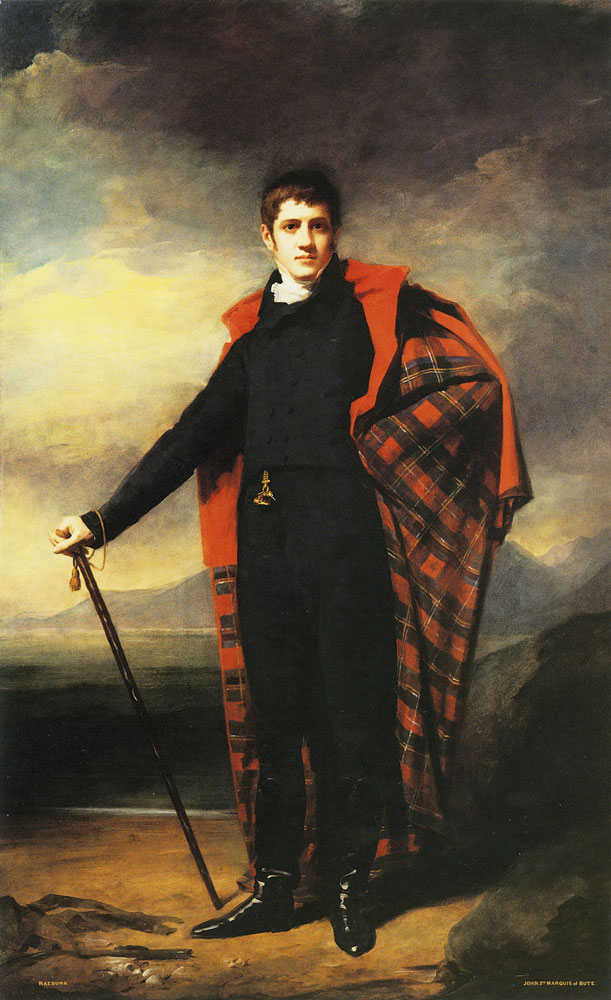
Portrait of the Marquess of Bute by Henry Raeburn

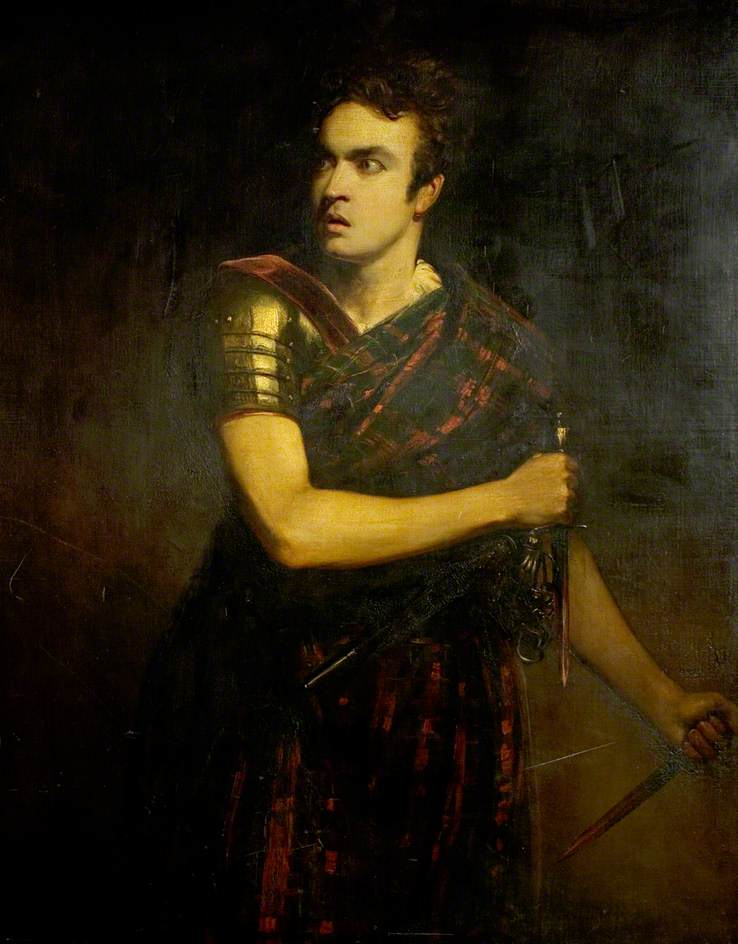
William Macready as Macbeth by John Jackson

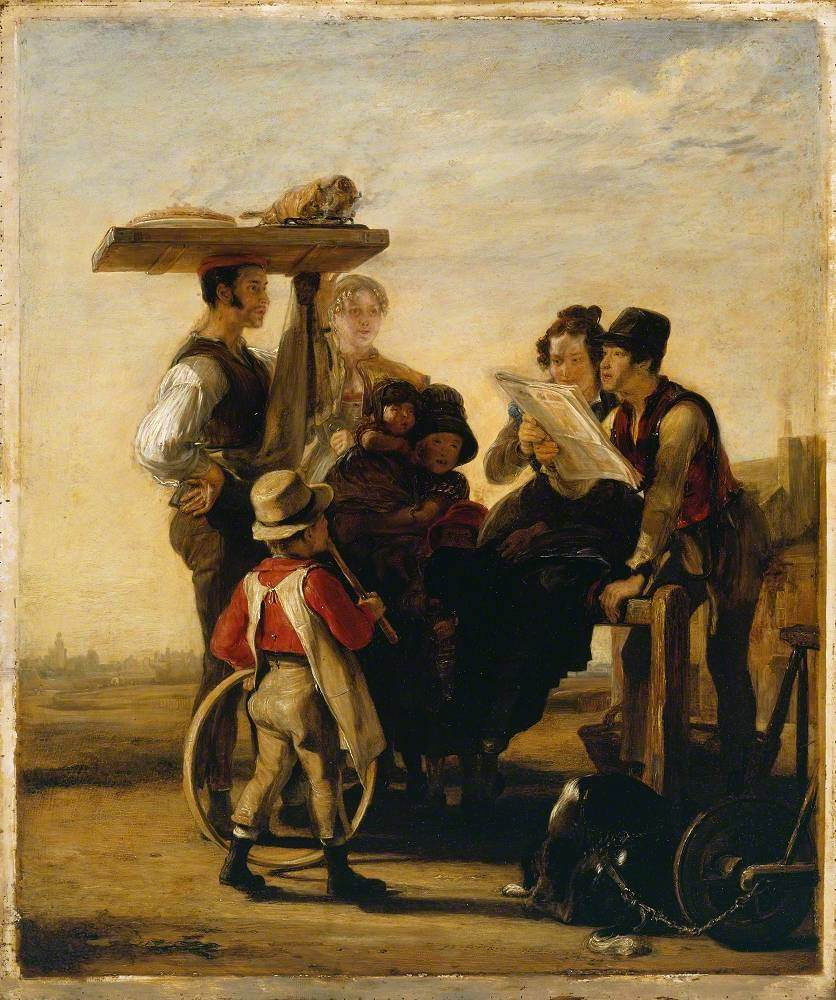
Newsmongers by David Wilkie

The Careless Messenger Detected by William Mulready

Nature Blowing Bubbles for Her Children by William Hilton

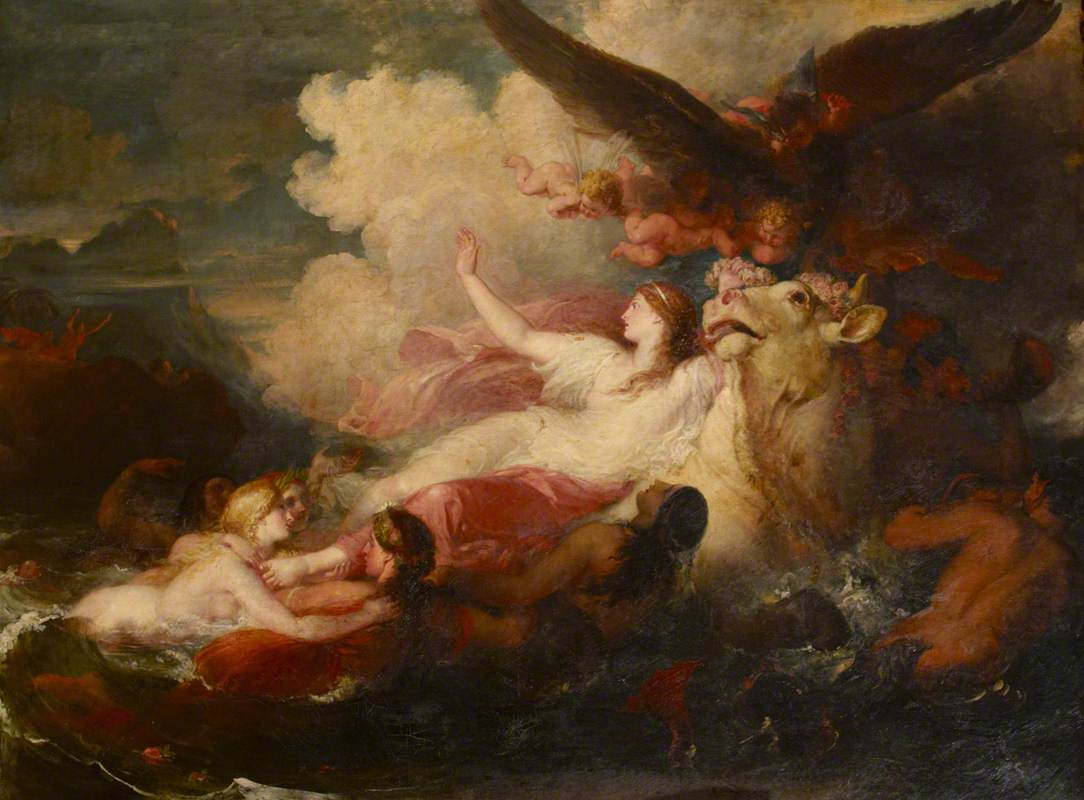
The Rape of Europa by William Hilton

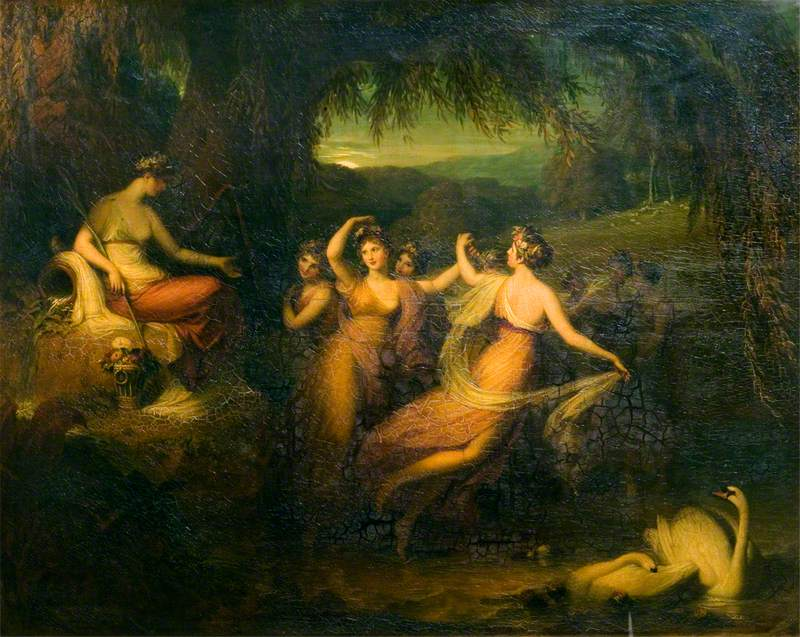
Sabrina by Henry Howard

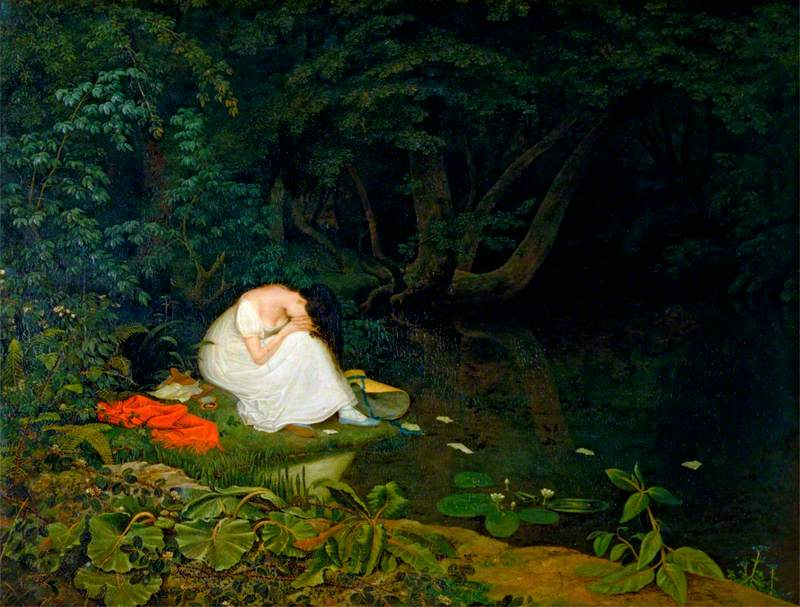
Disappointed Love by Francis Danby

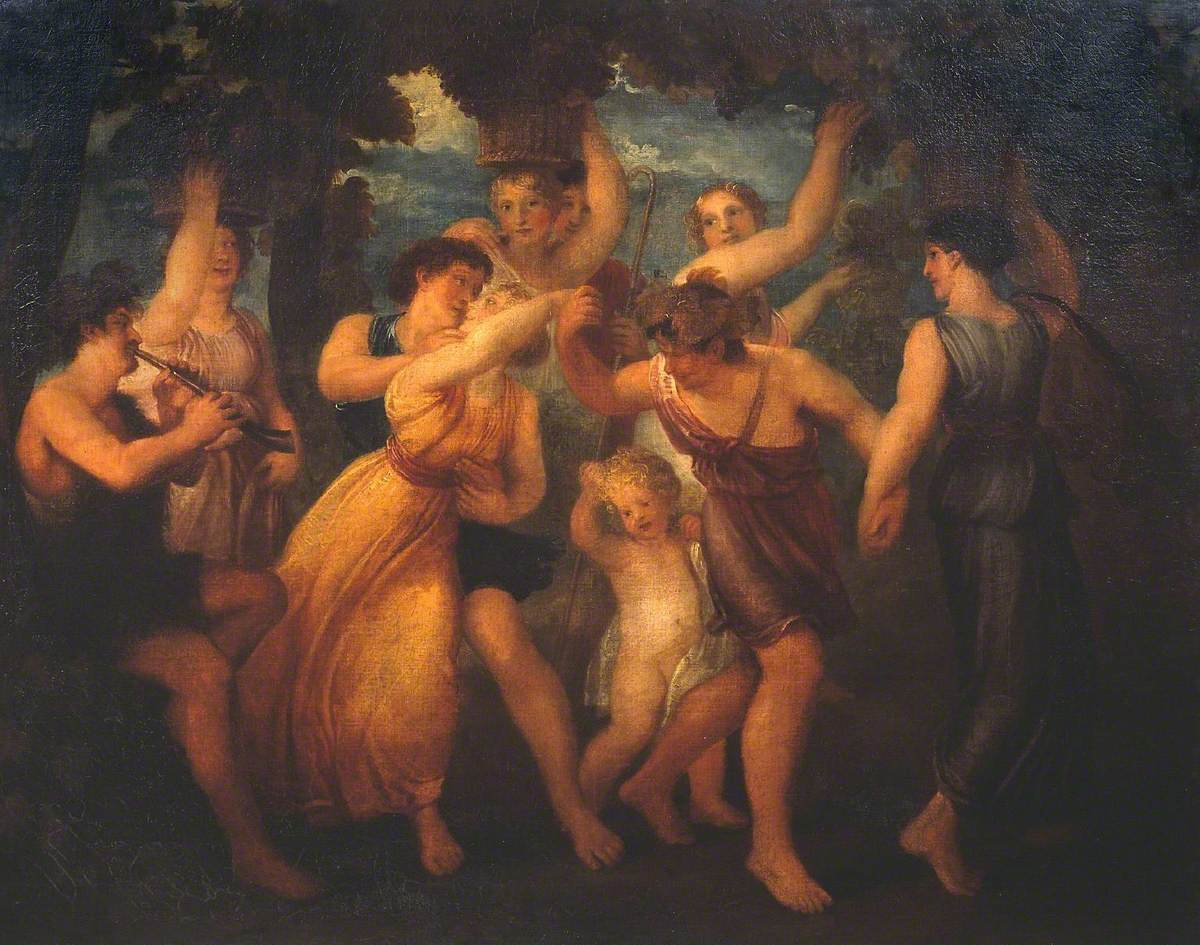
The Vintage by Thomas Stothard

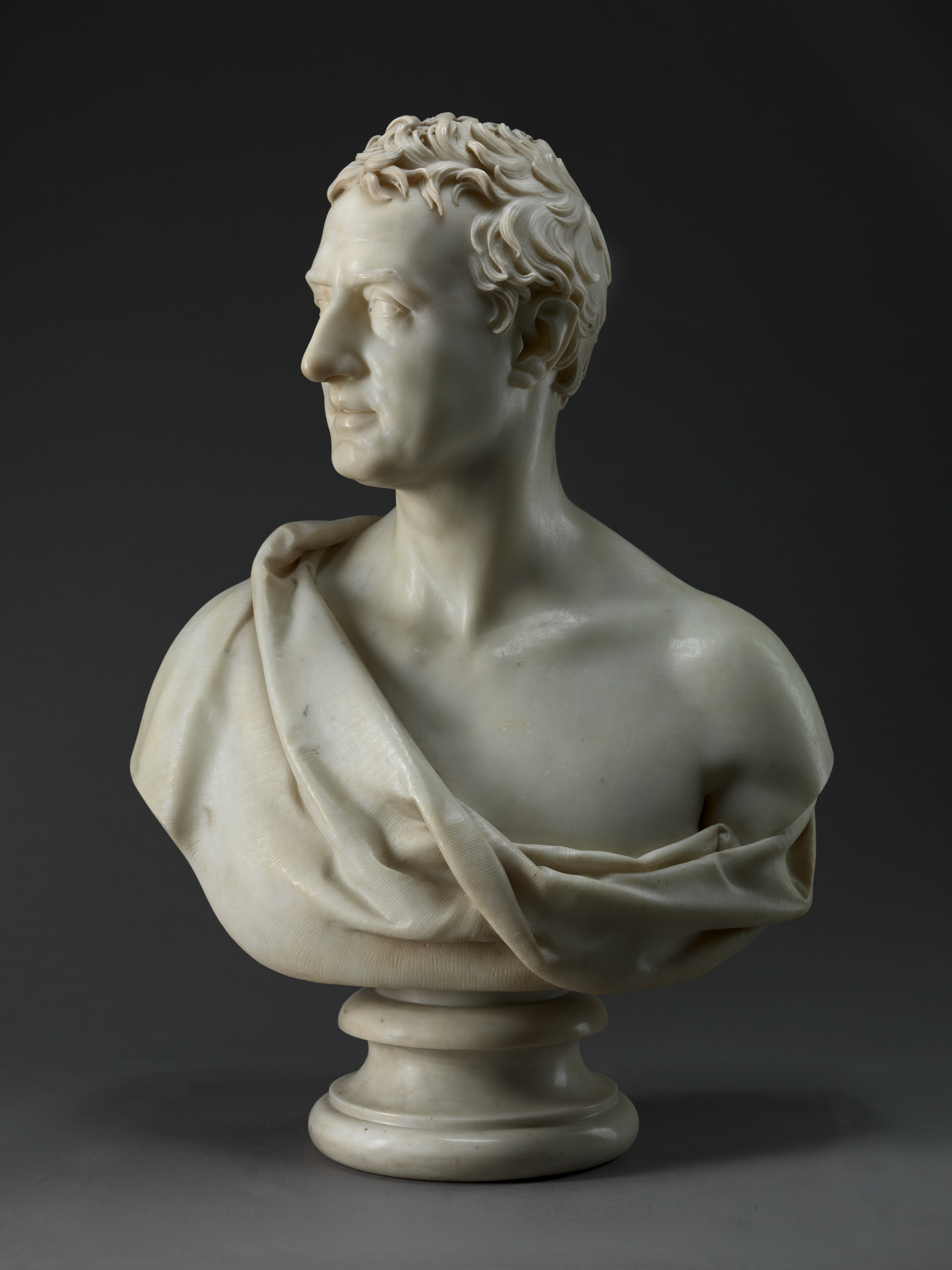
Bust of Lord Castlereagh by Francis Leggatt Chantrey

== See also ==
- Royal Academy Exhibition of 1822, held the following year

== Bibliography ==
- Hamilton, James. Turner - A Life. Sceptre, 1998.
- Hebron, Stephen, Shields, Cobalt & Wilcox, Timothy. The Solitude of Mountains: Constable and the Lake District. Wordsworth Trust, 2006
- Levey, Michael. Sir Thomas Lawrence. Yale University Press, 2005.
- Macmillan, Duncan. Scottish Art, 1460-2000. Mainstream Publishing, 2000.
- Noon, Patrick & Bann, Stephen. Constable to Delacroix: British Art and the French Romantics. Tate, 2003.
- Payne, Reider. War and Diplomacy in the Napoleonic Era: Sir Charles Stewart, Lord Castlereagh and the Balance of Power in Europe. Bloomsbury Academic, 2019.
- Tromans, Nicholas. David Wilkie: The People's Painter. Edinburgh University Press, 2007.
