= Portrait of Antonio Canova =

Painting by Antonio Canova

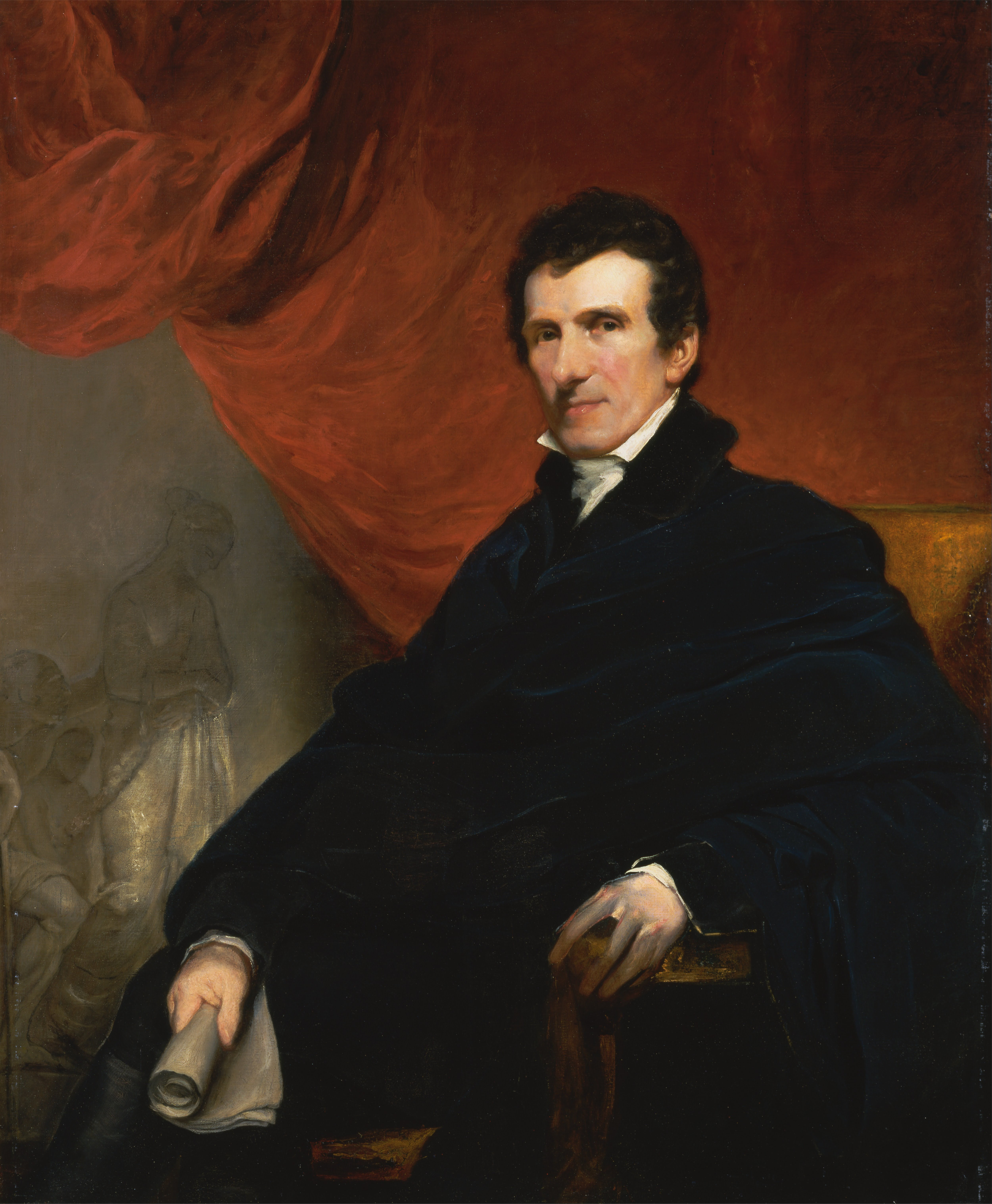
- Artist: John Jackson
- Year: 1819–20
- Type: Oil on canvas, portrait
- Dimensions: 124.5 cm × 102.2 cm (49.0 in × 40.2 in)
- Location: Yale Center for British Art, New Haven, Connecticut

Portrait of Antonio Canova is an 1820 portrait painting by the British artist John Jackson depicting the Italian sculptor Antonio Canova.

Jackson begun the work while visiting Rome in 1819 when Canova sat for him. It was exhibited at the Royal Academy's 1820 Summer Exhibition at Somerset House. It is now in the collection of the Yale Center for British Art. An engraving based on Jackson's work was produced in 1822 and is now in the British Museum. Another British artist Thomas Lawrence painted Canova around the same time, a version of which twenty copies exist.

== Bibliography ==
- Levey, Michael. Sir Thomas Lawrence. Yale University Press, 2005.
- Simon, Robert. The Portrait in Britain and America: With a Biographical Dictionary of Portrait Painters 1680-1914. G.K. Hall, 1987.
