= Disappointed Love =

Painting by Francis Danby

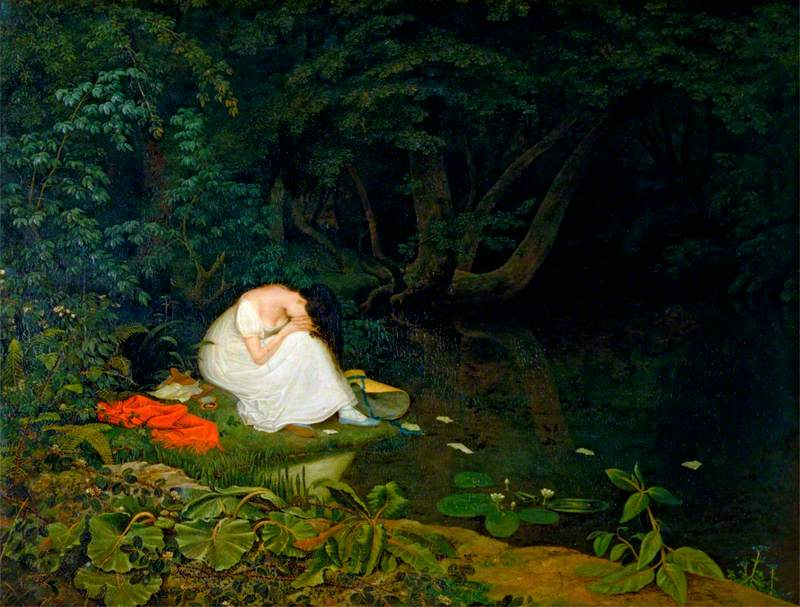
- Artist: Francis Danby
- Year: 1821
- Type: Oil on panel, genre painting
- Dimensions: 62.8 cm × 81.2 cm (24.7 in × 32.0 in)
- Location: Victoria and Albert Museum, London

Disappointed Love is an oil painting by the Irish artist Francis Danby, from 1821. It is held at the Victoria and Albert Museum, in London.

== History and description ==
It features a heartbroken young woman in a state of melancholy, due to a faithless lover. She is totally dressed in white, perhaps as a way to represent her purity, and covers her face, heartbroken and in tears, Next to her is a miniature painting of her lover, while the torn-up fragments of a love letter float across the water. The scene takes place in a natural set, with a lushful vegetation.

Danby was part of the Bristol School of artists known for their landscapes and genre scenes during the Regency era. The painting was displayed at the Royal Academy Exhibition of 1821 at Somerset House in London, the first time he had submitted works to the Royal Academy and became one of his best-known works.

Today the painting is in the collection of the Victoria and Albert Museum, in South Kensington, having been given by the art collector John Sheepshanks as part of the Sheepshanks Gift in 1857.

== Bibliography ==
- Burns, Sarah Lea. Speculations on the Development and Significance of the Ophelia Theme in 18th and 19th Century English Art. University of California, 1975.
- Carter, Julia. Bristol Museum and Art Gallery: Guide to the Art Collection. Bristol Books, 2017.
