= William Macready as Henry IV =

Painting by John Jackson

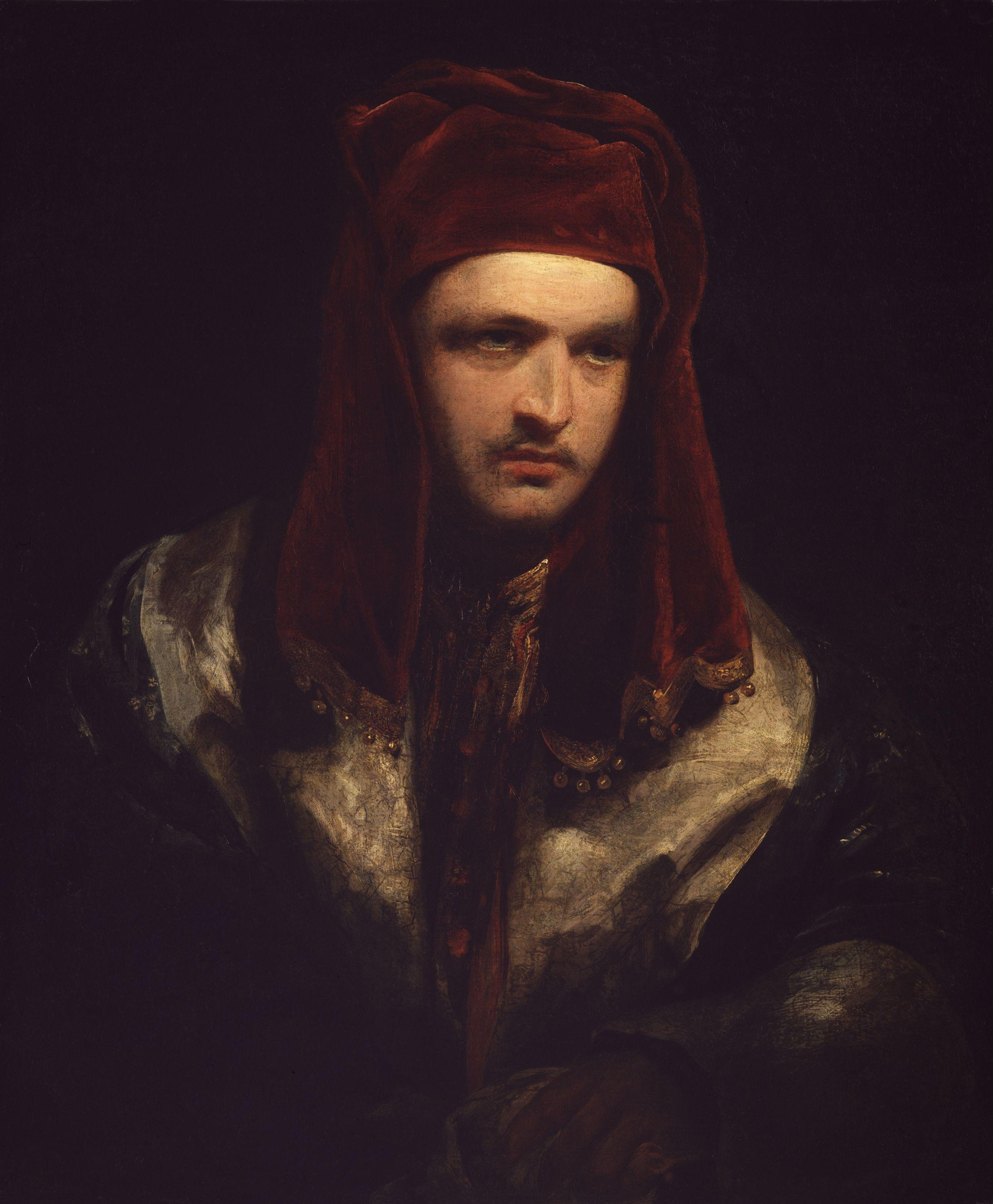
- Artist: John Jackson
- Year: 1821
- Type: Oil on canvas, portrait
- Dimensions: 91 cm × 62 cm (36 in × 24.5 in)
- Location: National Portrait Gallery, London

William Macready as Henry IV is an 1821 portrait painting by the British artist John Jackson depicting the actor William Macready in the role of Henry IV in William Shakespeare's Henry IV, Part 2.

Macready was a leading actor of the Regency era London stage. It was commissioned by Charles Mathews for his gallery of theatrical notables. Macready had played the role on 25 June 1821 in celebration of the coronation of George IV.

It was donated to the National Portrait Gallery in London by Macready in 1873, with a life interest for his wife who formally presented it to the gallery in 1908.

== See also ==
- Macready as Werner, an 1850 painting by Daniel Maclise

== Bibliography ==
- Cullen, Fintan. The Irish Face: Redefining the Irish Portrait. National Portrait Gallery, 2004
