= Lord Castlereagh (Chantrey) =

1821 sculpture

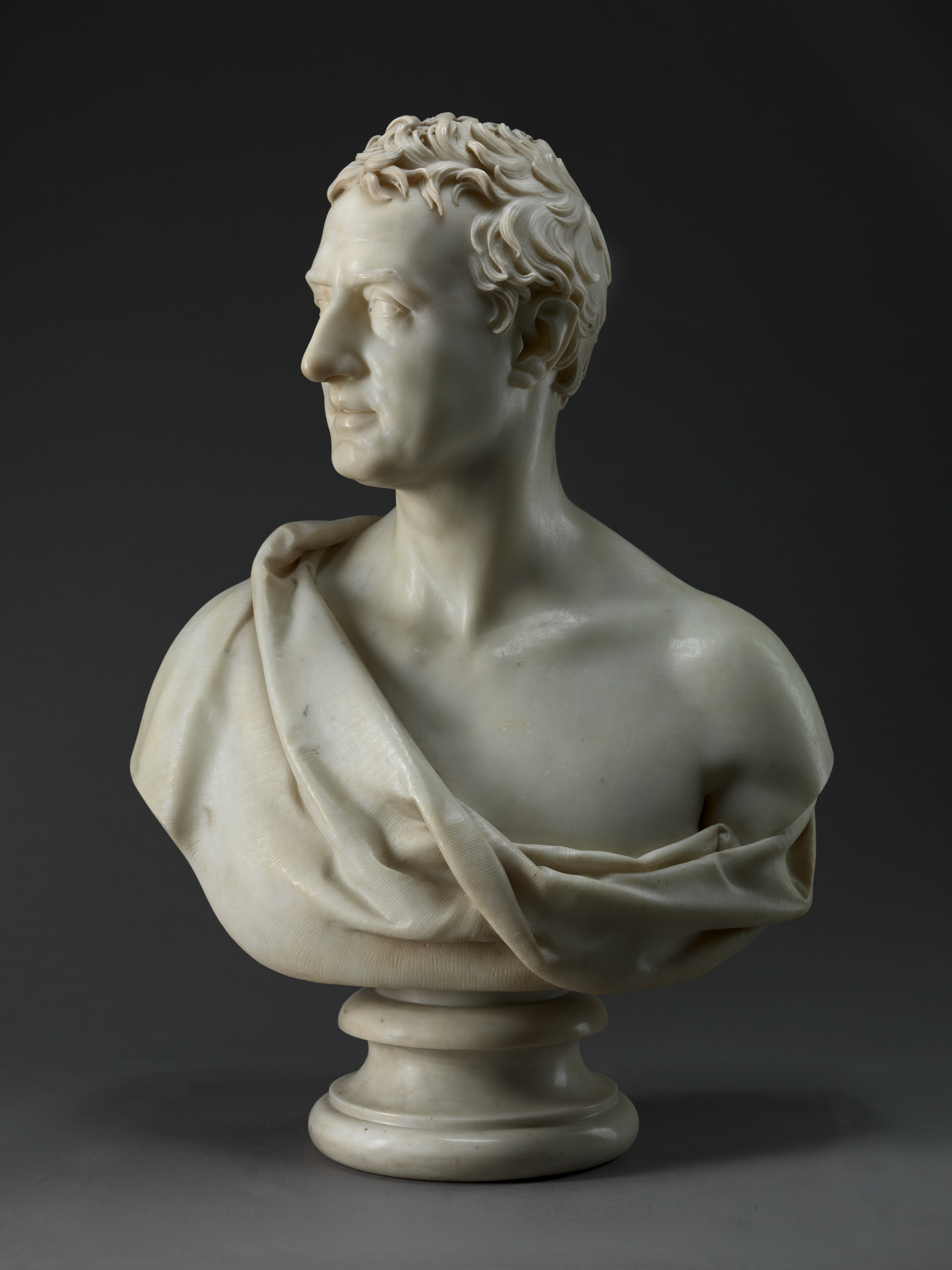
- Artist: Francis Leggatt Chantrey
- Year: 1821
- Medium: Marble
- Dimensions: 76.2 cm × 55.9 cm (2.50 ft × 1.83 ft)
- Location: Yale Center for British Art, Connecticut

Lord Castlereagh is an 1821 sculpture by the British artist Francis Leggatt Chantrey. A portrait bust it depicts the Irish-British statesman Lord Castlereagh. Chantrey was a leading sculptor of the Regency era and this was considered one of his finest works.

Castlereagh had served as British Foreign Secretary since 1812 and had played a key role in assembling the coalitions that defeated Napoleon. He was preparing to head to the Congress of Verona, but showing signs of overwork and instability he committed suicide by cutting his throat in August 1822. He is shown in classical dress.

The sculpture was displayed at the Royal Academy Exhibition of 1821 at Somerset House. The original version was inherited by his brother Charles and located at Mount Stewart in Ireland. As the likeness was widely appreciated and much in demand after Castlereagh's suicide several replicas were produced by Chantry including ones now in the Yale Center for British Art. and the National Portrait Gallery in London. Another version, dated 1822, is at Apsley House in London, the residence of his friend and political ally the Duke of Wellington. George IV commissioned a version for Windsor Castle in 1828. The original plaster cast is in the collection of the Ashmolean Museum.

Castlereagh had also sat to another leading British sculptor Joseph Nollekens in 1809, a work that was displayed at the Royal Academy Exhibition of 1811.

== Bibliography ==
- Dunkerly, S. Francis Chantrey' Sculptor: From Norton to Knighthood. Hallamshire Press, 1995.
