= Newsmongers =

Painting by David Wilkie

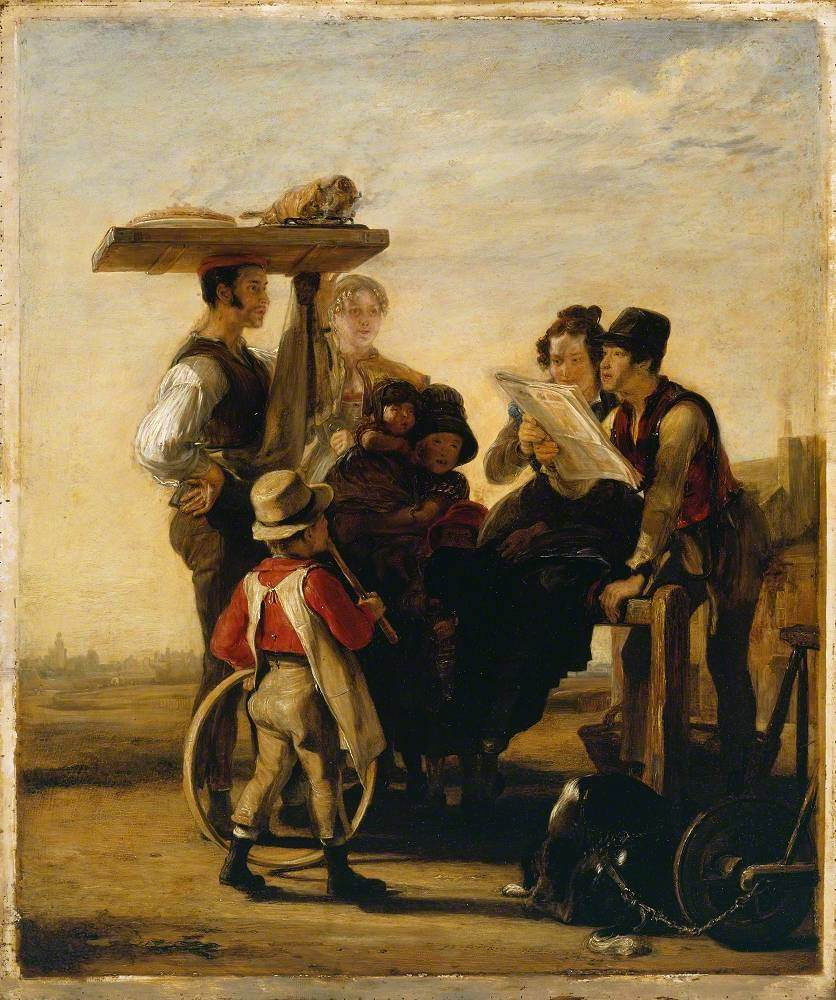
- Artist: David Wilkie
- Year: 1821
- Type: Oil on mahogany, genre painting
- Dimensions: 43.7 cm × 36.1 cm (17.2 in × 14.2 in)
- Location: Tate Britain, London

Newsmongers is an 1821 genre painting by the Scottish artist David Wilkie. It portrays a group gathered around a man and woman holding up a newspaper. The group includes a baker carrying a pie and roast joint. The news being read is not specified, but its been speculated that might be news of the Napoleonic Wars or the more recent Trial of Queen Caroline.

The work was commissioned by General Edmund Phipps, the brother of the politician and art collector Lord Mulgrave. It was displayed at the Royal Academy Exhibition of 1821 at Somerset House. It is now in the collection of Tate Britain, having been acquired for the nation via Robert Vernon in 1847.

== Bibliography ==
- Noon, Patrick & Bann, Stephen. Constable to Delacroix: British Art and the French Romantics. Tate, 2003.
- Tromans, Nicholas. David Wilkie: The People's Painter. Edinburgh University Press, 2007.
