= Portrait of Sir Humphry Davy =

1821 painting by Thomas Lawrence

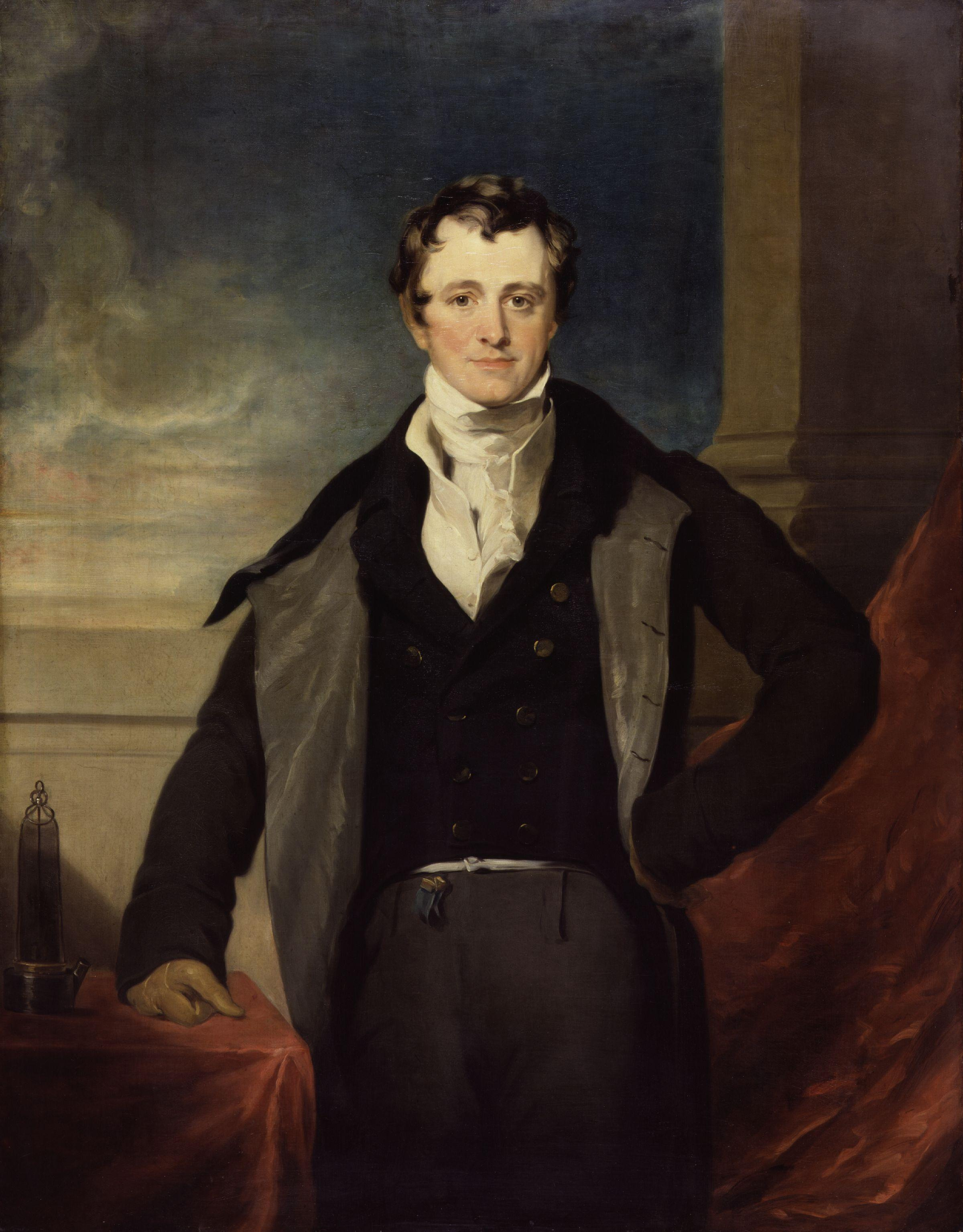
- Version in the National Portrait Gallery
- Artist: Thomas Lawrence
- Year: 1821
- Type: Oil on canvas, portrait
- Dimensions: 142 cm × 110 cm (55.9 in × 44 in)
- Location: Royal Society, London

Portrait of Sir Humphry Davy is an oil on canvas portrait painting by the British artist Thomas Lawrence, from 1821. It depicts the scientist Sir Humphry Davy, president of the Royal Society.

== History and description ==
Davy is known for the invention of the Davy Lamp and isolating a number of elements using electricity. It shows Davy in the stance of a swagger portrait dressed in fashionable Regency era style. A Davy Lamp sits on the table next to him.

Lawrence was Britain's leading portraitist and had succeeded Benjamin West as president of the Royal Academy the previous year. Lawrence and Davy were friends and in the year of the painting the two presidents took part together in the Coronation of George IV at Westminster Abbey, representing the arts and sciences.

The painting appeared at the Royal Academy Exhibition of 1821 at Somerset House. The original was given by Davy's wife to the Royal Society following his death in 1829. The copy in the National Portrait Gallery was done by Lawrence's studio, likely by Richard Evans. The same year Davy sat for another portrait by Lawrence's fellow artist Thomas Phillips which is also now in the National Portrait Gallery.

== Bibliography ==
- Golinski, Jan. The Experimental Self: Humphry Davy and the Making of a Man of Science. University of Chicago Press, 2016.
- Levey, Michael. Sir Thomas Lawrence. Yale University Press, 2005.
- Smith, E.A. George IV. Yale University Press, 1999.
