= John Jackson (painter) =

English painter (1778–1831)

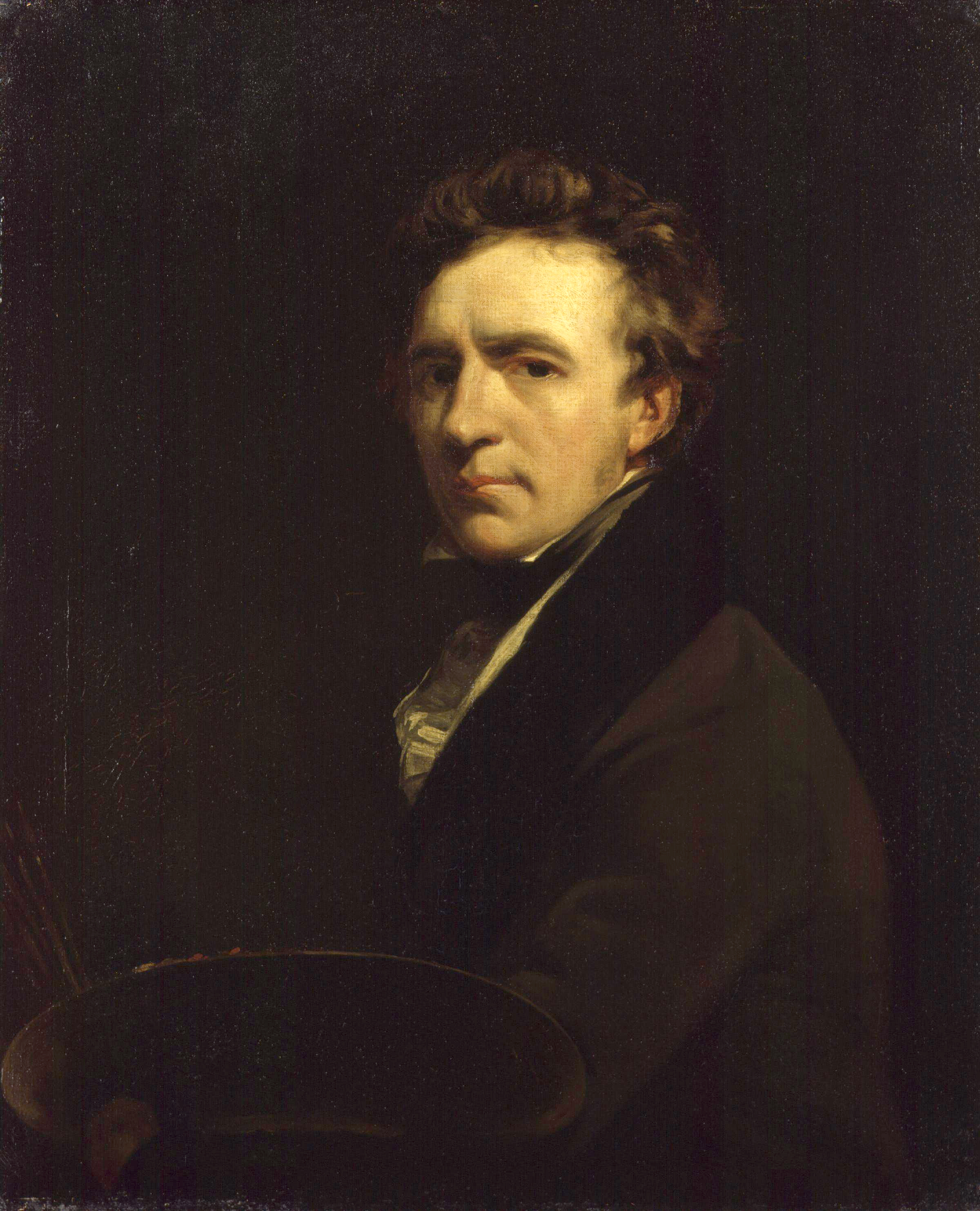
- Self-portrait, c. 1823
- Born: 31 May 1778
- Died: 1 June 1831 (aged 53)
- Occupation: Painter
- Spouses: Maria Frances Fletcher (m. 1808; died 1817) Matilda Louisa Ward (m. 1818)

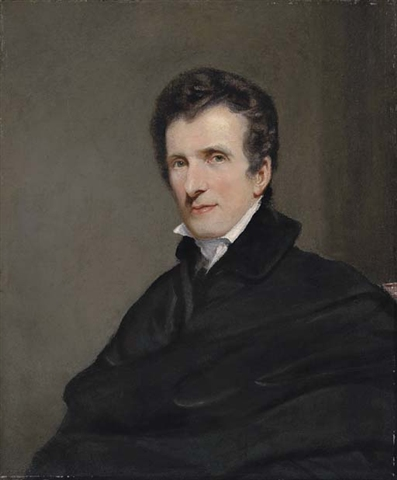
Portrait of Antonio Canova by John Jackson (c. 1819)

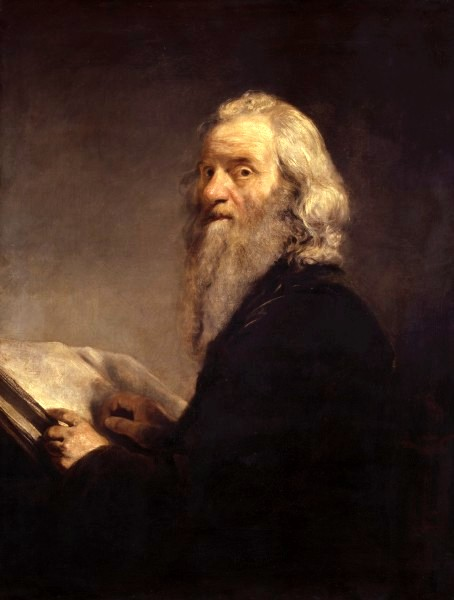
A Jewish Rabbi (c. 1817)

John Jackson RA (31 May 1778 – 1 June 1831) was a British portraitist.

John Jackson was baptised on 31 May 1778 in Lastingham, Yorkshire, and started his career as an apprentice tailor to his father, also John Jackson, who opposed the artistic ambitions of his son. John Jackson's mother was Ann Warrener and he had at least one brother, Roger Jackson.

However, John enjoyed the support of Henry Phipps, 1st Earl of Mulgrave (1755–1831), who recommended him to the Earl of Carlisle; as well as that of Sir George Beaumont, 7th Baronet, who offered him residence at his own home and £50 per year. As a result, Jackson was able to attend the Royal Academy Schools, where he befriended David Wilkie and B. R. Haydon. At Castle Howard, residence of the Earl of Carlisle, he could study and copy from a large collection of paintings. His watercolours were judged to be of uncommon quality.

By 1807 Jackson's reputation as a portrait painter had become established, and he made the transition to oils steadily, if not easily, regularly forwarding paintings to Somerset House. After a visit to the Netherlands and Flanders with Edmund Phipps in 1816, he accompanied Sir Francis Chantrey on a trip to Switzerland, Rome, Florence and Venice in 1819. In Rome he was elected to the Academy of St Luke. His portrait of Antonio Canova, painted on this trip, was regarded as outstanding.

Jackson was a prolific portraitist, strongly showing the influence of Sir Thomas Lawrence and Henry Raeburn in his work. His sitters included the Duke of Wellington, the explorer Sir John Franklin and some noted Wesleyan ministers. His 1823 portrait of Lady Dover, wife of George Agar-Ellis, 1st Baron Dover, was widely acclaimed.

He was a Royal Academy student from 9 March 1805, was elected an Associate of the RA on 6 November 1815 and elected a full member on 10 February 1817.

John Jackson was married twice, the first marriage in 1808 was to Maria Frances Fletcher, the daughter of a jeweller, Samuel Fletcher. His second marriage in August 1818 was to Matilda Louisa Ward, the daughter of the painter James Ward and a niece of George Morland. He died in 1831 in St John's Wood, London.

He had three children with his first wife Maria: Maria Rosa Jackson was born in 1808 and died in 1888. His son Charles Fletcher Jackson was born in 1810 and died in infancy in 1811. His second son, John Edmund Jackson was born in 1816 and again died in infancy in March 1817. John Jackson's first wife Maria also died in March 1817 shortly before their son John Edmund died.

John's first daughter, Maria Rosa Jackson married Marmaduke Brewer and she later ran a school in Monmouthshire.

Jackson had three confirmed children with Matilda. His first son, Howard William Mansfield Jackson was born in 1824. His second son with Matilda, Mulgrave Phipps Jackson, who went on to exhibit his own work at the Royal Academy, was born in 1830.

== Gallery ==
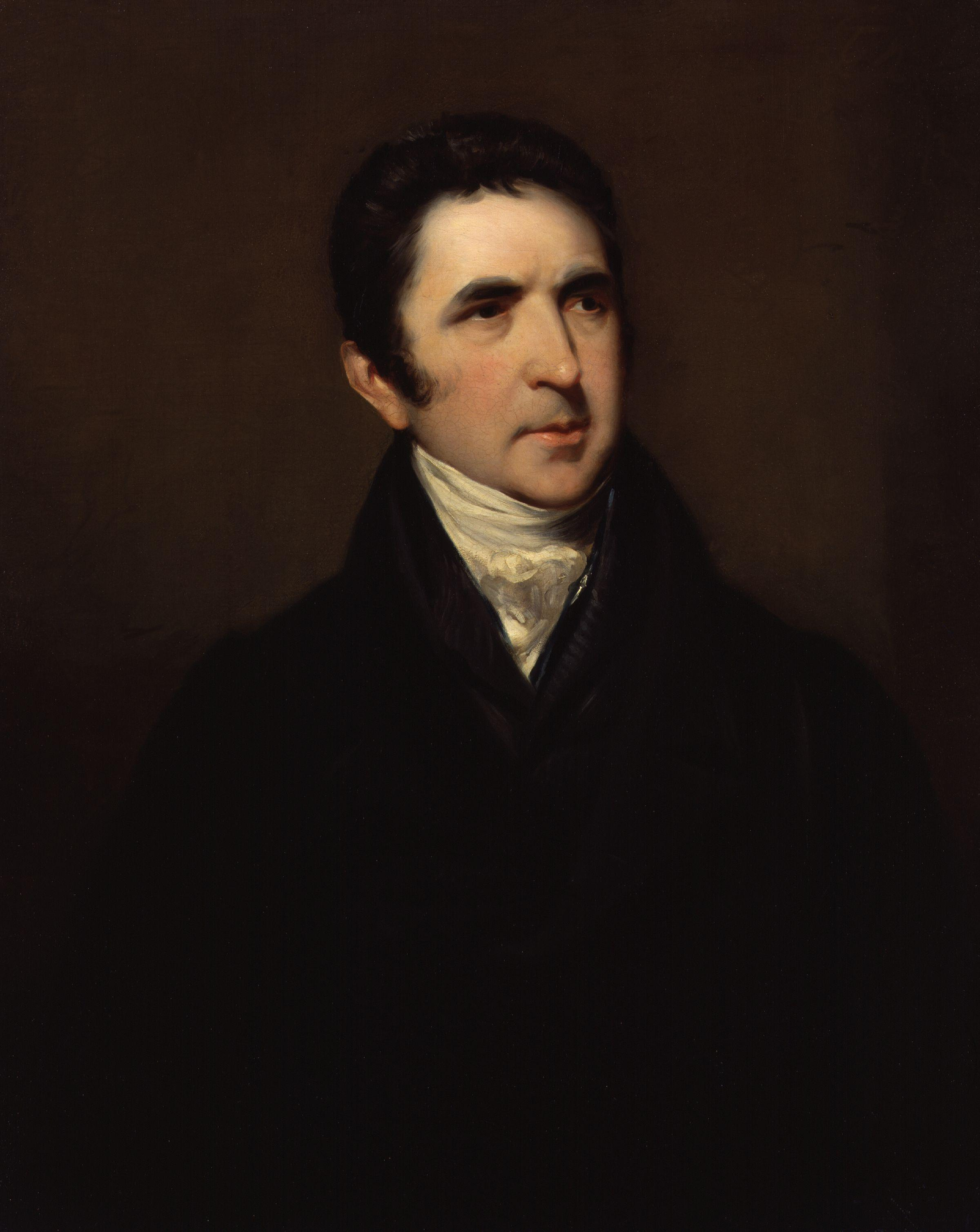
Sir John Barrow, 1810

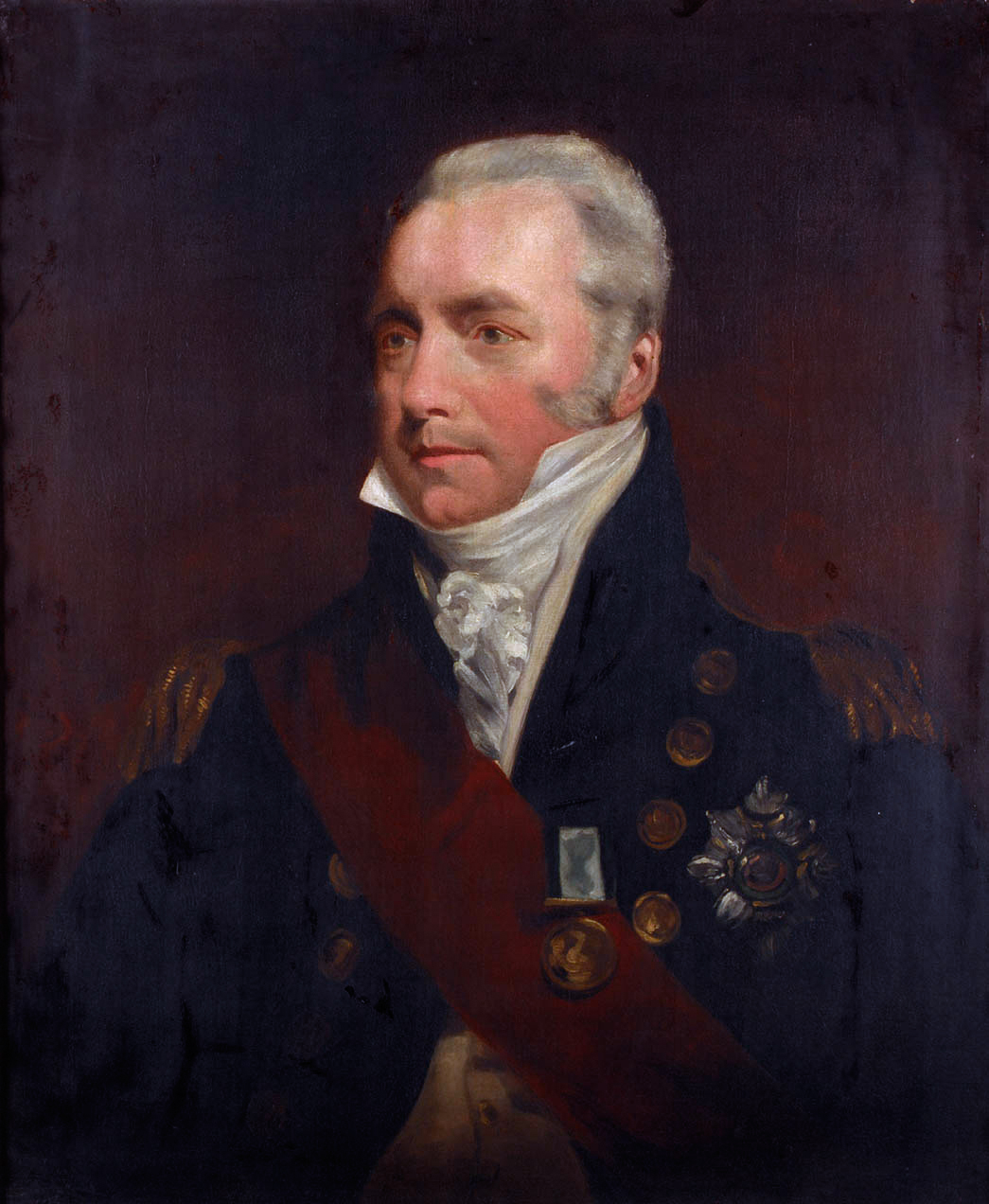
Richard Goodwin Keats, 1817

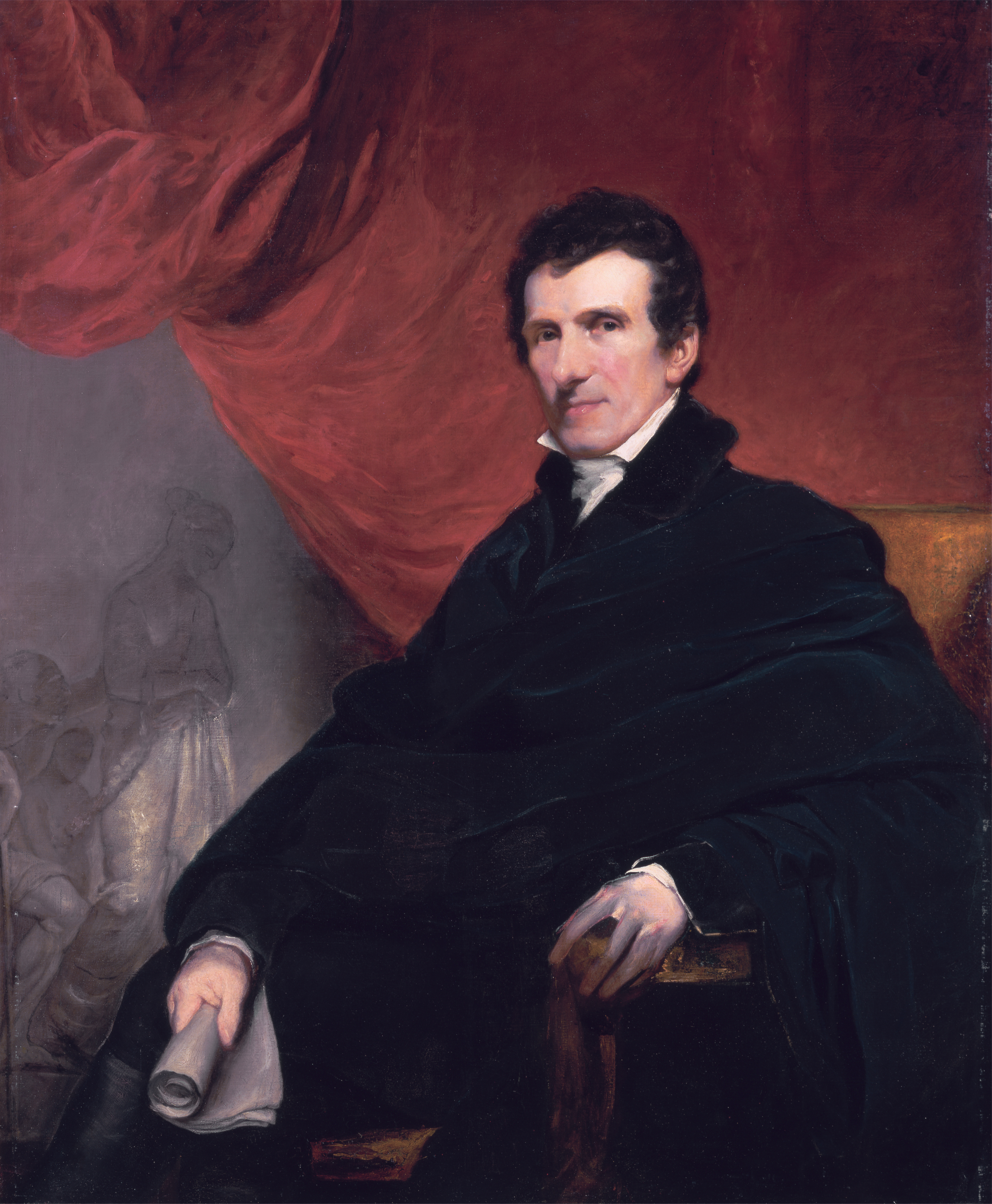
Portrait of Antonio Canova, 1820

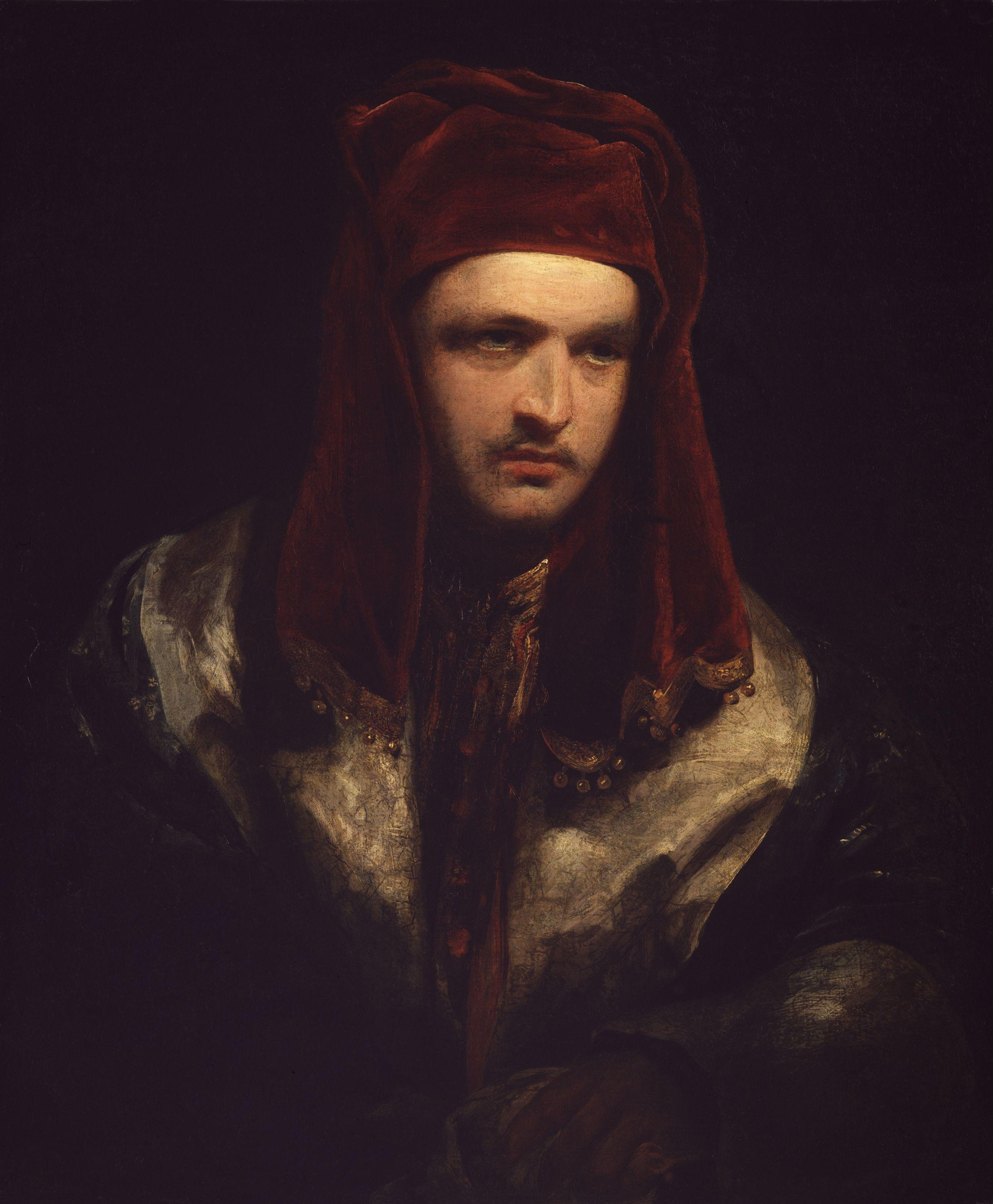
William Macready as Henry IV, 1821

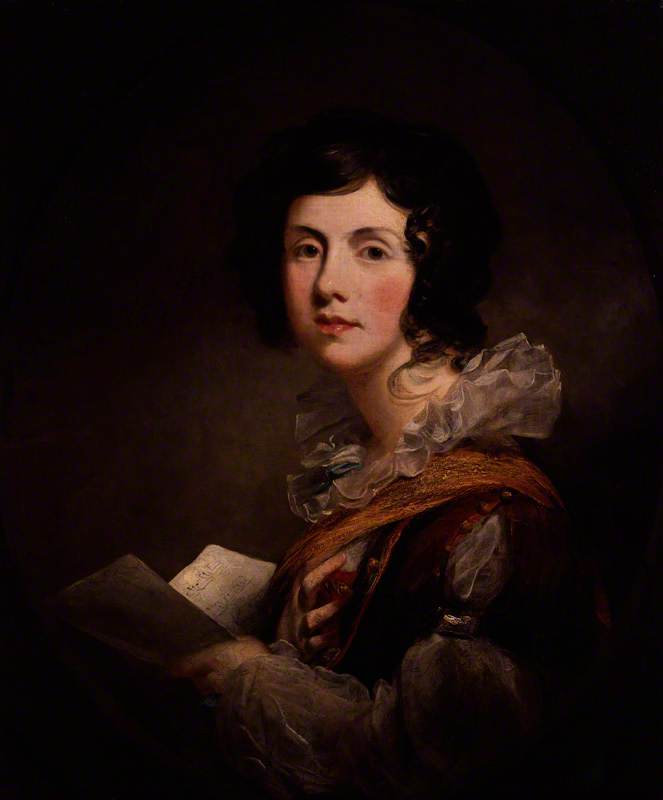
Catherine Stephens, 1822

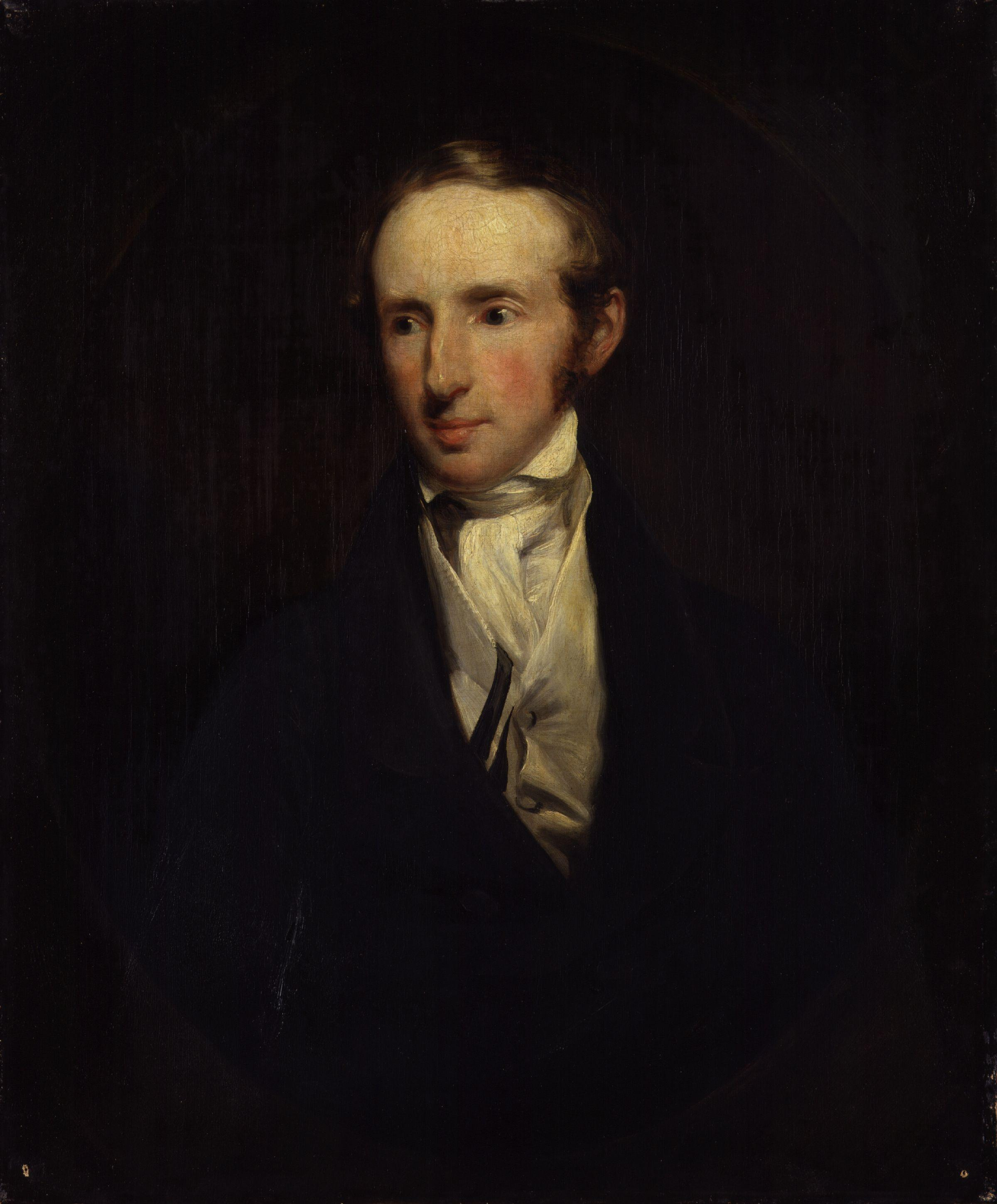
Samuel Prout, 1823

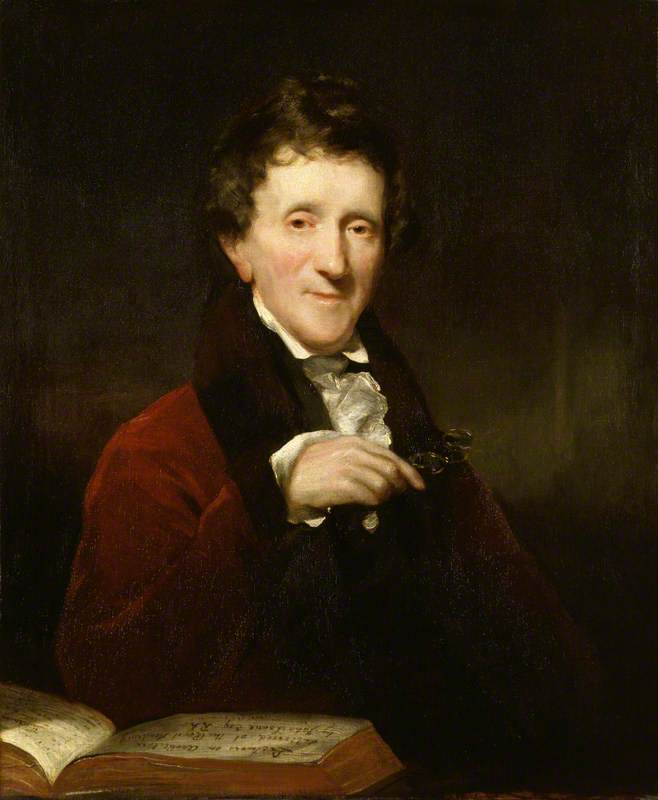
John Soane, 1828

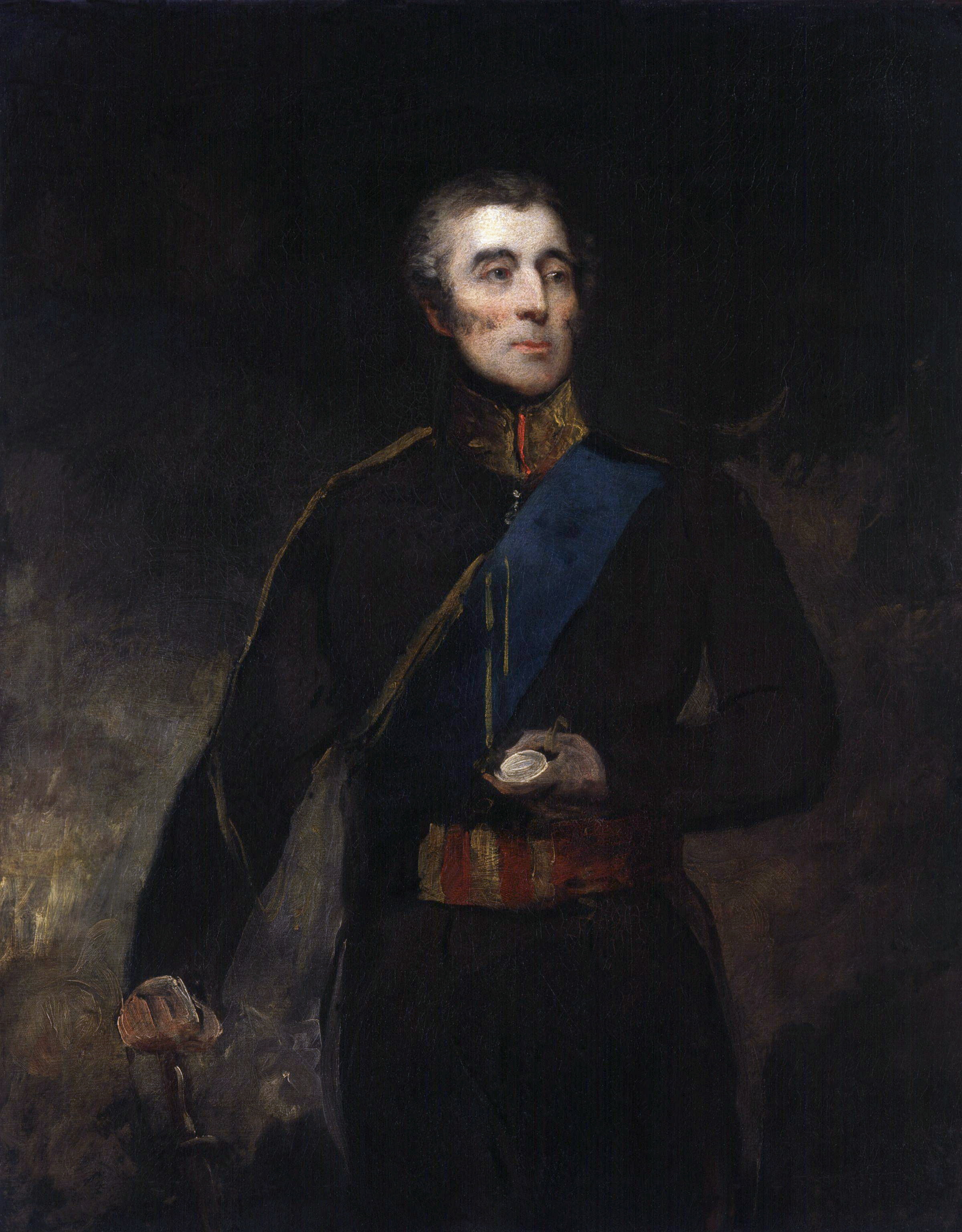
Duke of Wellington, 1831
