= The Hay Wain =

Painting by John Constable

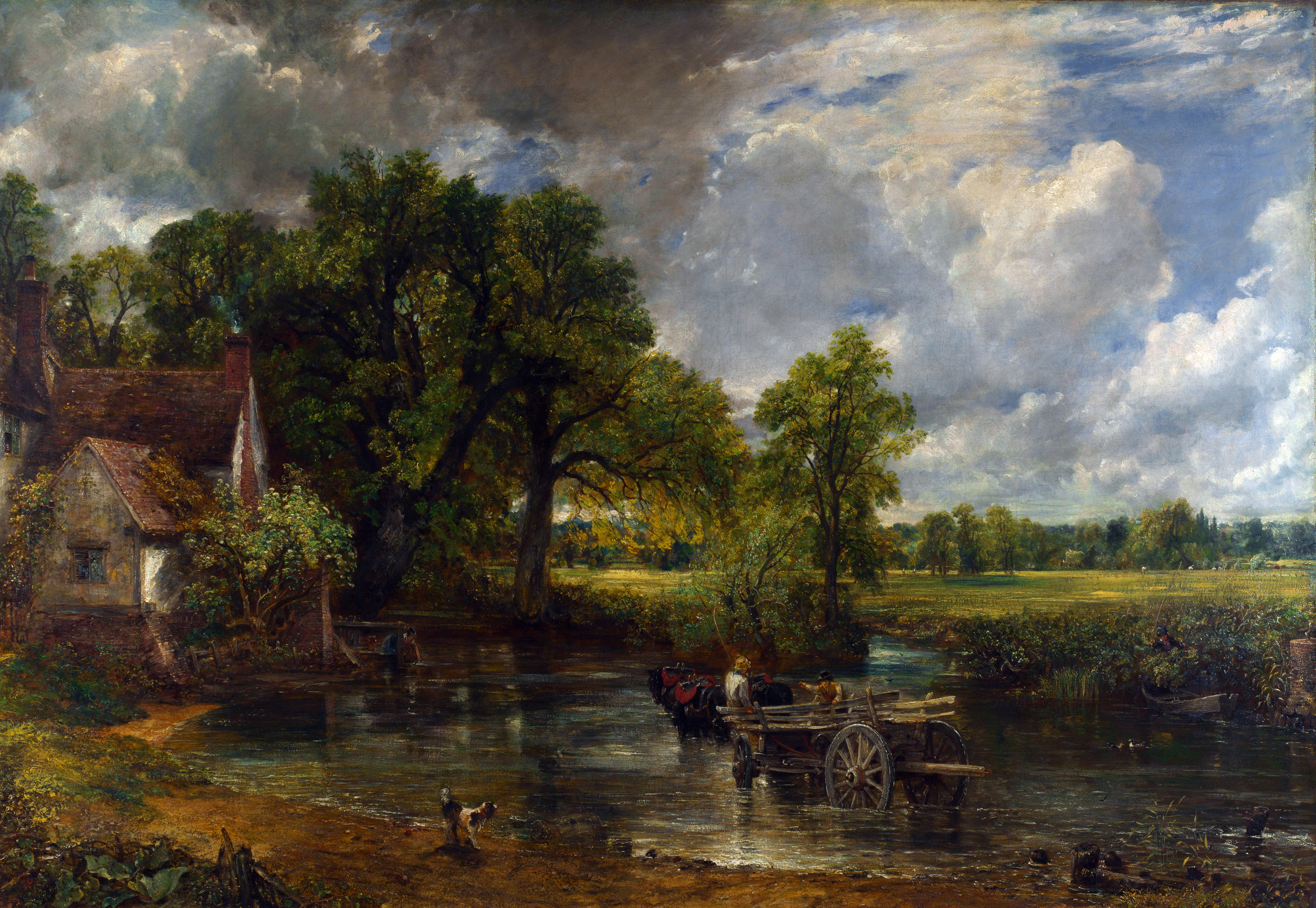
- Artist: John Constable
- Year: 1821
- Medium: Oil on canvas
- Dimensions: 130.2 cm × 185.4 cm (51 1/4 in × 73 in)
- Location: National Gallery, London

The Hay Wain – originally titled Landscape: Noon – is a painting by John Constable, completed in 1821, which depicts a rural scene on the River Stour between the English counties of Suffolk and Essex. It hangs in the National Gallery in London and is regarded as "Constable's most famous image" and one of the greatest and most popular English paintings. It is considered as one of the quintessential paintings from the Romantic movement of arts and literature.

Painted in oils on canvas, the work depicts as its central feature three horses pulling what appears to be a wood wain or large farm waggon across the river. Willy Lott's Cottage, also the subject of an eponymous painting by Constable, is visible on the far-left. The scene takes place near Flatford Mill in Suffolk, though since the Stour forms the border of two counties, the left bank is in Suffolk and the landscape on the right bank is in Essex.

The Hay Wain is one of a series of paintings by Constable called the "six-footers", large-scale canvasses which he painted for the annual summer exhibitions at the Royal Academy. As with all of the paintings in this series, Constable produced a full-scale oil sketch for the work; this is now in the Victoria and Albert Museum in London. Another small oil-sketch, the first in his experimentation with extending of the composition of the painting to the right, is now in the collection of the Yale Center for British Art. Constable originally exhibited the finished work with the title Landscape: Noon, suggesting that he envisaged it as belonging to the classical landscape tradition of representing the cycles of nature.

The painting measures 130.2 cm × 185.4 cm (51 1/4 in × 73 in).

== History ==
Flatford Mill was owned by Constable's father. The house on the left side of the painting belonged to a neighbour, Willy Lott, a tenant farmer, who was said to have been born in the house and never to have left it for more than four days in his lifetime. Willy Lott's Cottage still survives practically unaltered, but none of the trees in the painting exist today.

Although The Hay Wain is revered today as one of the greatest British paintings, when it was originally appeared at the Royal Academy Exhibition of 1821 at Somerset House (under the title Landscape: Noon), it failed to find a buyer.

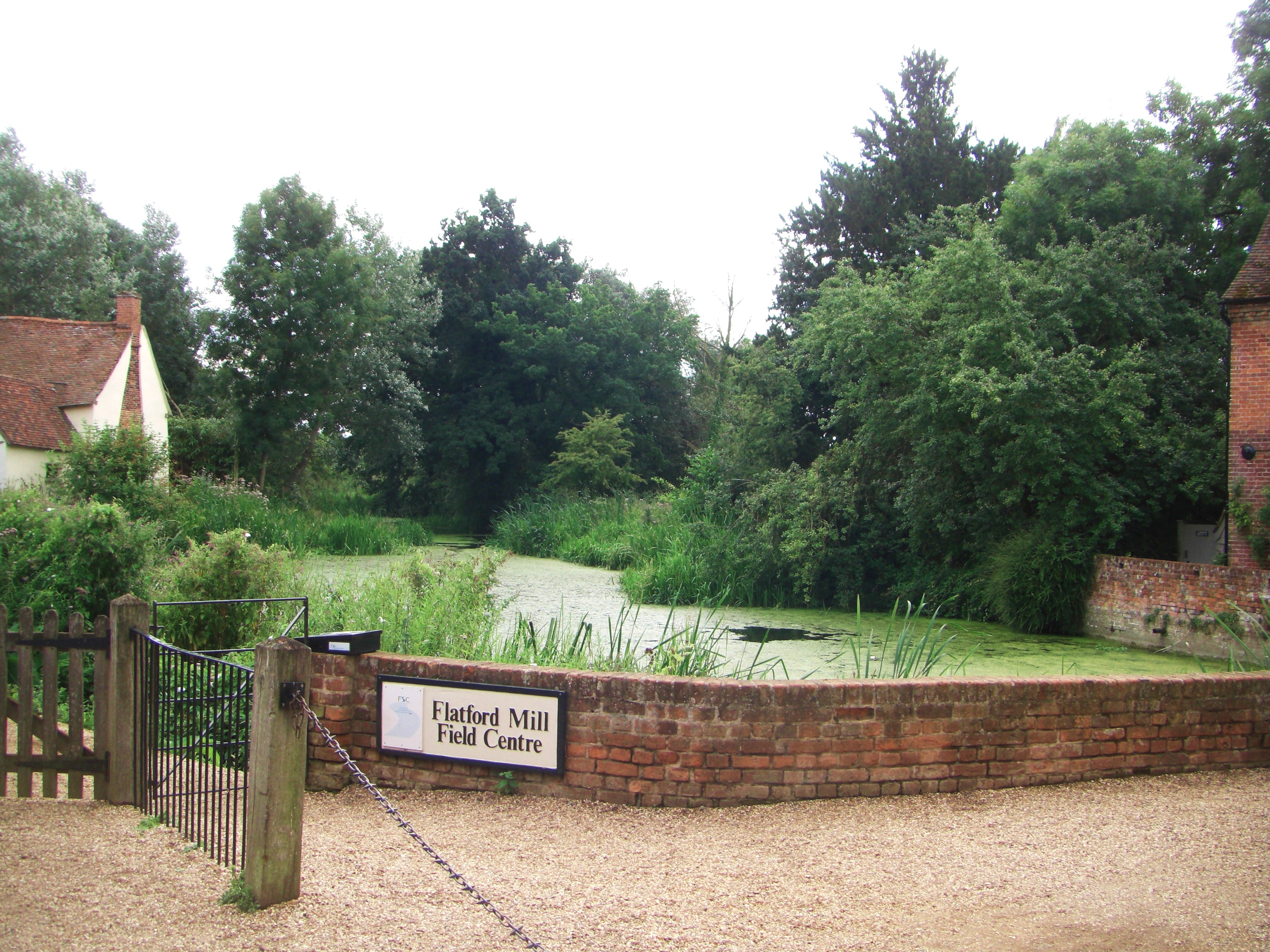
The site in Flatford, Suffolk where The Hay Wain was painted, now a tourist destination, in 2010.

It was considerably better received in France where it was praised by Théodore Géricault. The painting caused a sensation when it was exhibited, along with View on the Stour near Dedham and Yarmouth Jetty, at the Salon of 1824 in Paris (it has been suggested that the inclusion of Constable's paintings in the exhibition was a tribute to Géricault, who died early that year). In that exhibition, The Hay Wain was singled out for a gold medal awarded by Charles X of France, a cast of which is incorporated into the picture's frame. The works by Constable in the exhibition inspired a new generation of French painters, including Eugène Delacroix. The French writer Stendhal, who visited the exhibition, wrote: "We have never seen anything like these pictures before. It is their truthfulness that is so striking." According to Christine Riding, Director of Collections and Research at the National Gallery, though, "In some ways, he's offering up a fiction: a highly curated landscape containing elements that have been added later to improve the composition and broaden its appeal (…) There's nothing natural about that landscape (…) It's all man-made (…) The fields are agriculture, a managed landscape".

When sold at the exhibition with three other Constables to the dealer John Arrowsmith, The Hay Wain was brought back to England by another dealer, D. T. White; he sold it to a Mr. Young who resided in Ryde on the Isle of Wight. It was there that the painting came to the attention of the collector Henry Vaughan and the painter Charles Robert Leslie. On the death of his friend Mr. Young, Vaughan bought the painting from the former's estate; in 1886, he presented it to the National Gallery in London, where it hangs today. In his will, Vaughan bequeathed the full-scale oil sketch for The Hay Wain, made with a palette knife, to the South Kensington Museum (now the Victoria and Albert Museum).

The Hay Wain was voted the second most popular painting in any British gallery, second only to Turner's Fighting Temeraire, in a 2005 poll organised by BBC Radio 4's Today programme.

A study produced by the charity Art History in Schools suggests that the waggon has stopped in the river to allow the horses to drink and to cool down, but also to expand the waggon's wheels. The hot weather prevailing at the time of the harvest would cause the wooden wheels to shrink while the iron rims, or tyres, around them would expand, leading the tyres to loosen and wobble. Immersing the wheels in the river addressed the problem by causing the wood to expand and grip the tyres. It notes that such details of agricultural life would have been well known to Constable.

On 28 June 2013, a protester, reported to be connected with Fathers 4 Justice, glued a photograph of a young boy to the painting while it was on display at the National Gallery. The work was not permanently damaged. On 4 July 2022, two Just Stop Oil protestors attached their own modified "apocalyptic vision of the future" version of the painting to the original and glued themselves to the frame. The National Gallery said the surface varnish of the painting and its frame suffered minor damage.

== See also ==
- List of paintings by John Constable
