= Napoleon's Tomb (painting) =

Painting by Horace Vernet

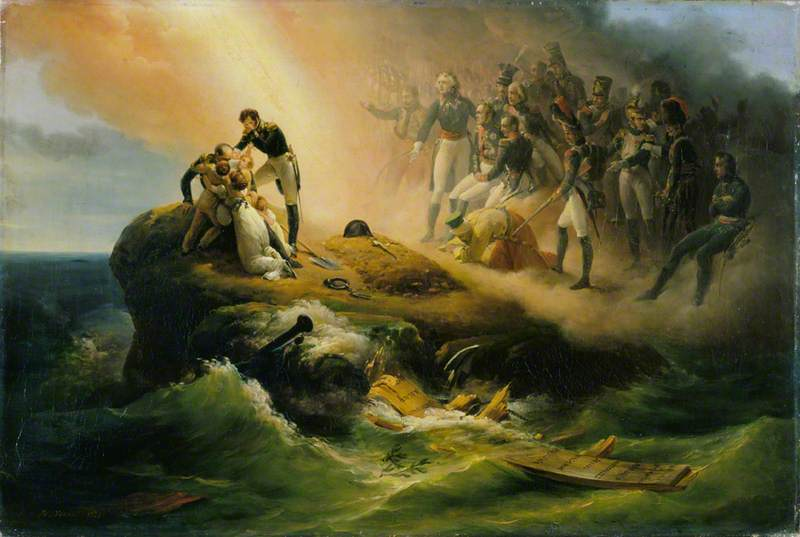
- Artist: Horace Vernet
- Year: 1821
- Type: Oil on canvas, history painting
- Dimensions: 54 cm × 80.5 cm (21 in × 31.7 in)
- Location: Wallace Collection; London

Napoleon's Tomb (French title: L'Apothéose de Napoléon) is an 1821 oil painting by the French artist Horace Vernet. An allegory, it depicts the apotheosis of the former emperor of France Napoleon following his death in exile on the island of Saint Helena.

== History and description ==
Although in reality Napoleon was buried by a stream in the Valley of the Tomb on the island (until his body was repatriated to France in 1840), Vernet depicts it as a dramatic promontory with the wreckage of nearby ship bearing the names of some of his most famous victories. To the left of the tomb generals Charles Tristan and Henri Gatien Bertrand and his family who had accompanied Napoleon into exile are mourning. To the right several of his dead former Marshals (including Louis-Alexandre Berthier and Jean Lannes) and troops are gathered to welcome him.

It was produced during the Restoration era when the House of Bourbon has been restored to the French throne. It has been mentioned as one of the paintings that Vernet had rejected for exhibition at the Salon of 1822, leading to the artist withdrawing his other works from the Salon. However the two barred paintings were the battle scenes The Gate at Clichy and The Battle of Jemappes. Vernet produced the painting in July 1821 two months after Napoleon's death. This version is now untraceable but in October the same year Vernet created a second version which is now in the Wallace Collection in London, having been acquired in 1834.

== Bibliography ==
- Driskel, Michael Paul. As Befits a Legend: Building a Tomb for Napoleon, 1840-1861. Kent State University Press, 1993.
- Duffy, Stephen. The Wallace Collection. Scala, 2005.
- Dwyer, Philip. Napoleon: Passion, Death and Resurrection, 1815-1840. Bloomsbury Publishing, 2019.
- Harkett, Daniel & Hornstein, Katie (ed.) Horace Vernet and the Thresholds of Nineteenth-Century Visual Culture. Dartmouth College Press, 2017.
