= The Battle of Jemappes =

Painting by Horace Vernet

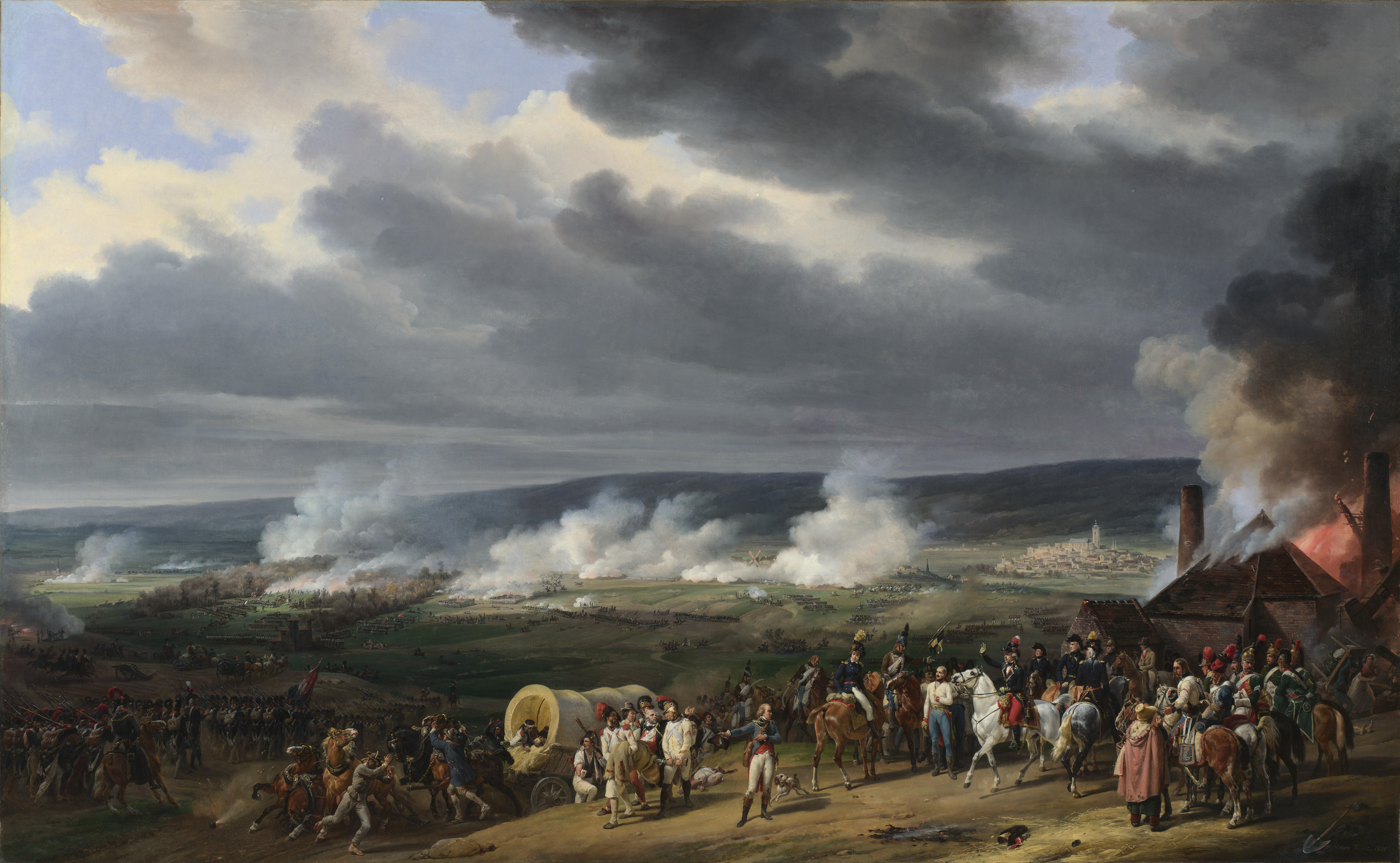
- Artist: Horace Vernet
- Year: 1821
- Medium: Oil on canvas
- Dimensions: 177.2 cm × 288.3 cm (69.8 in × 113.5 in)
- Location: National Gallery, London

The Battle of Jemappes is an 1821 history painting by the French artist Horace Vernet. It depicts the Battle of Jemmapes fought on 6 November 1792 near Jemappes in modern-day Belgium. Stylistically it is part of the developing romantic movement in art.

One of the earliest battles of the French Revolutionary Wars Jemappes fought between forces of the French First Republic and the Austrian Empire. A major French victory, achieved two months before execution of the deposed Louis XVI, it launched the Flanders Campaign in the Austrian Netherlands. It was the first of a series of four major battles paintings commissioned from Vernet by the Duke of Orleans, a cousin of Louis XVIII and leader of the Liberal opposition and himself a future monarch. All of the paintings, produced between 1821 and 1826 featured French victories in the recent Napoleonic Wars.

The presence of French tricolours in the painting as well as its celebration of a revolutionary victory were considered potentially subversive during the Restoration era. This led the authorities at the Louvre to reject both this and another painting by Vernet The Gate at Clichy from display at the Salon of 1822 in Paris. In response Vernet withdrew all his entries from exhibition except one (Joseph Vernet Tied to a Mast During a Storm) and staged his own private exhibition in his studios that included both banned paintings.

The painting was damaged by fire during the Revolution of 1848 when the Palais-Royal was ransacked by crowds. It was then acquired by Lord Hertford who had Vernet restore it. Today it is in the collection of the National Gallery in London.

== Bibliography ==
- Harkett, Daniel & Hornstein, Katie (ed.) Horace Vernet and the Thresholds of Nineteenth-Century Visual Culture. Dartmouth College Press, 2017.
- Hornstein, Katie. Picturing War in France, 1792–1856. Yale University Press, 2018.
- Murray, Christopher John. Encyclopedia of the Romantic Era, 1760–1850, Volume 2. Taylor & Francis, 2004.
