= Salon of 1822 =

1822 art exhibition in Paris

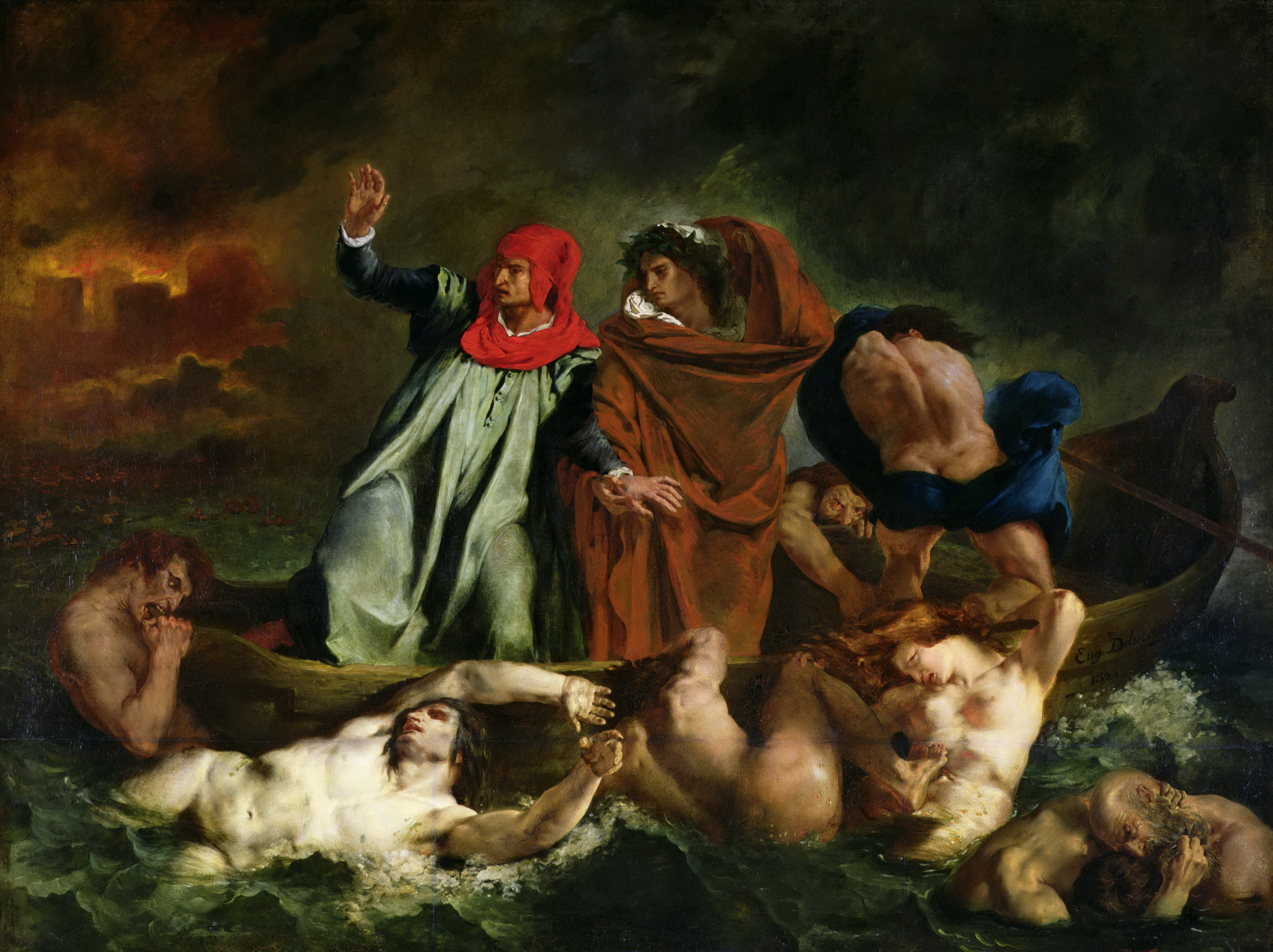
The Barque of Dante by Eugène Delacroix

The Salon of 1822 was an art exhibition held at the Louvre in Paris, opening on 24 April 1822. The Salon took place every two or three years at the time and featured paintings and sculpture. One of the most notable works to be displayed was The Barque of Dante by the romantic painter Eugène Delacroix, which owed much to Théodore Géricault's The Raft of the Medusa which had appeared at the previous Salon of 1819. Taking place during the Restoration era, it was the last to be held during the reign of Louis XVIII. The Salon of 1824 took place after his brother Charles X had succeeded to the throne.

The Salon was notable for a boycott by Horace Vernet. After two of his paintings The Gate at Clichy and The Battle of Jemappes were rejected by the authorities as their theme depicting battles of the Revolutionary and Napoleonic eras due to being potentially subversive he withdrew all his other paintings from the exhibition barring one, the royal commission Joseph Vernet Tied to a Mast During a Storm. Vernet instead held his own solo exhibition in his studio. Louis-Léopold Boilly displayed two street scenes of Paris Moving Day and Distribution of Wine and Food on the Champs-Elysées. Jean-Charles Langlois was awarded a gold medal for his battle scenes. Notable first time exhibitors were Paul Delaroche and Richard Parkes Bonington.

== Gallery ==
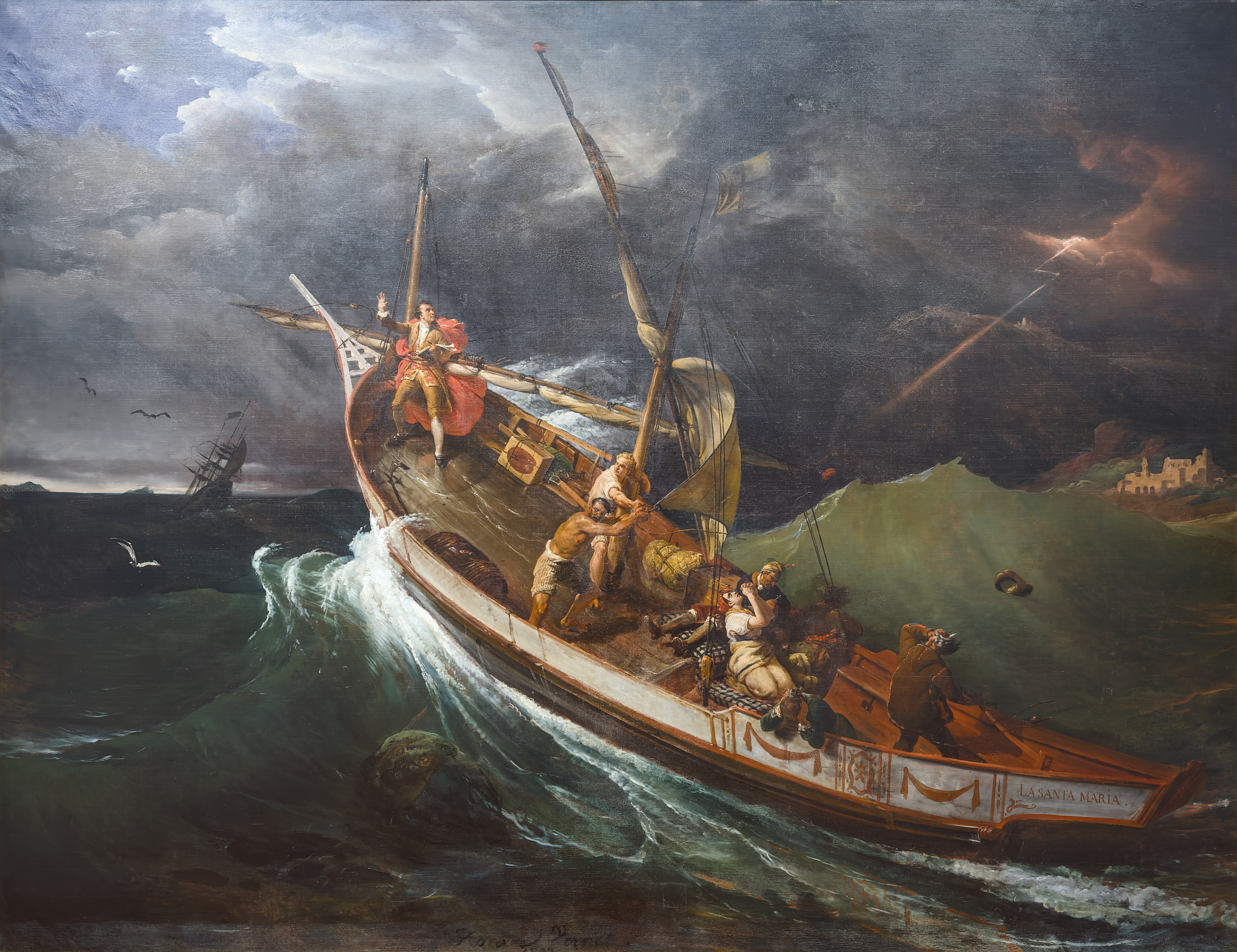
Joseph Vernet Tied to a Mast During a Storm by Horace Vernet

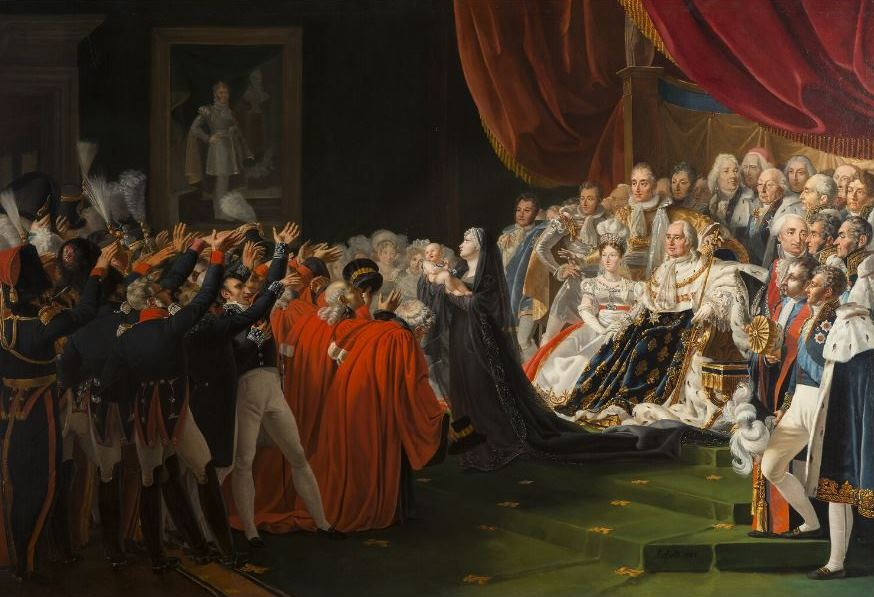
The Duchess of Berry Presenting the Duke of Bordeaux by Charles Nicolas Lafond

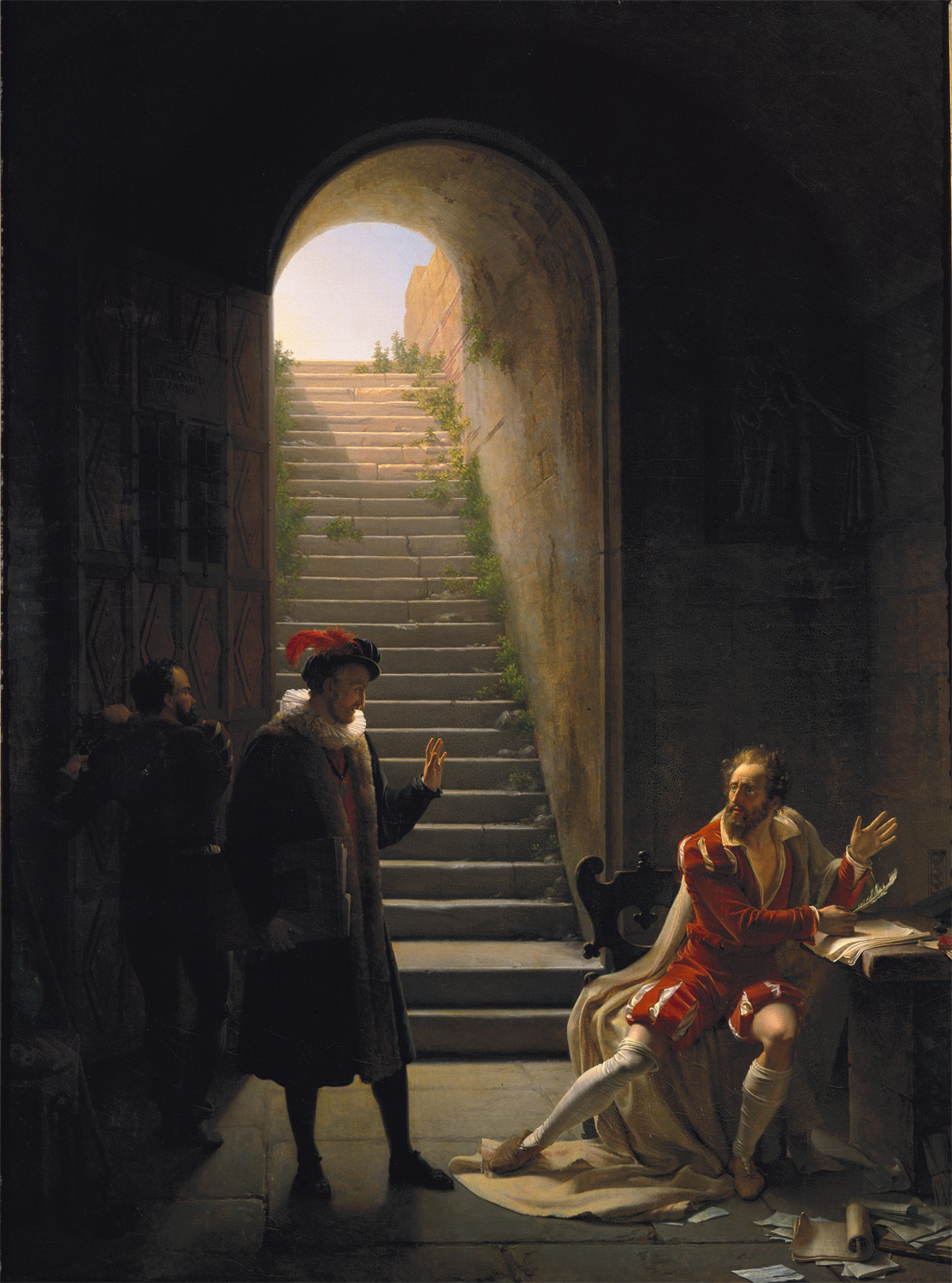
Montaigne Visiting Torquato Tasso in Prison by Fleury François Richard

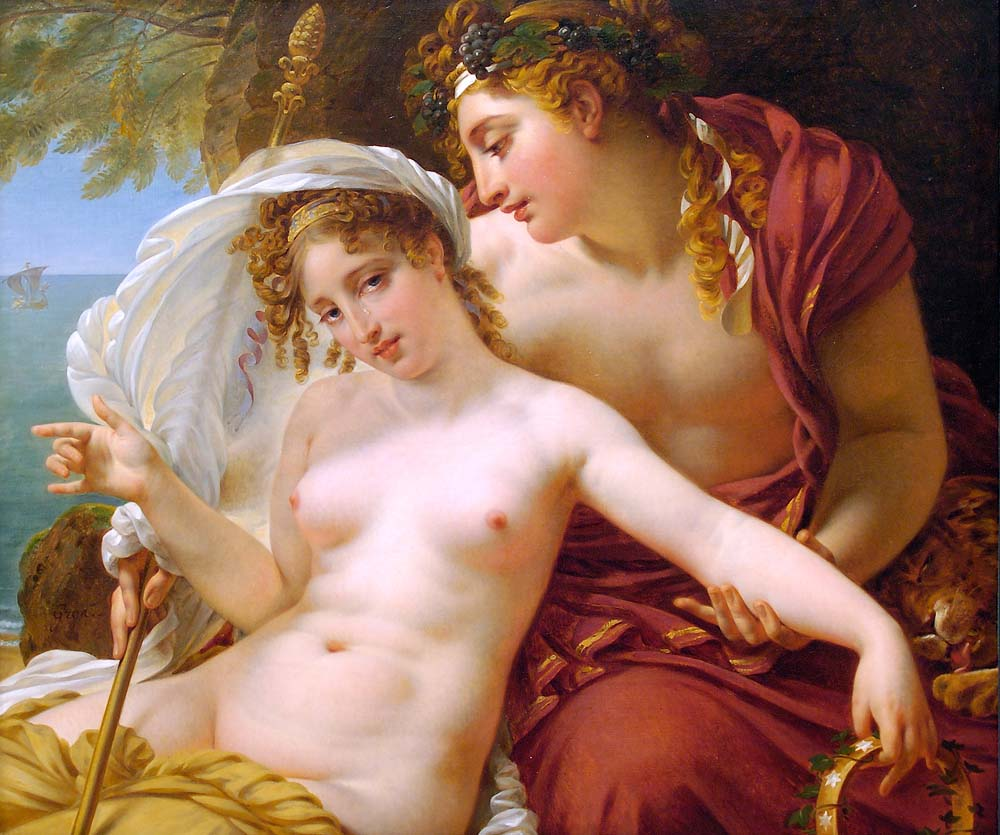
Bacchus and Ariadne by Antoine-Jean Gros

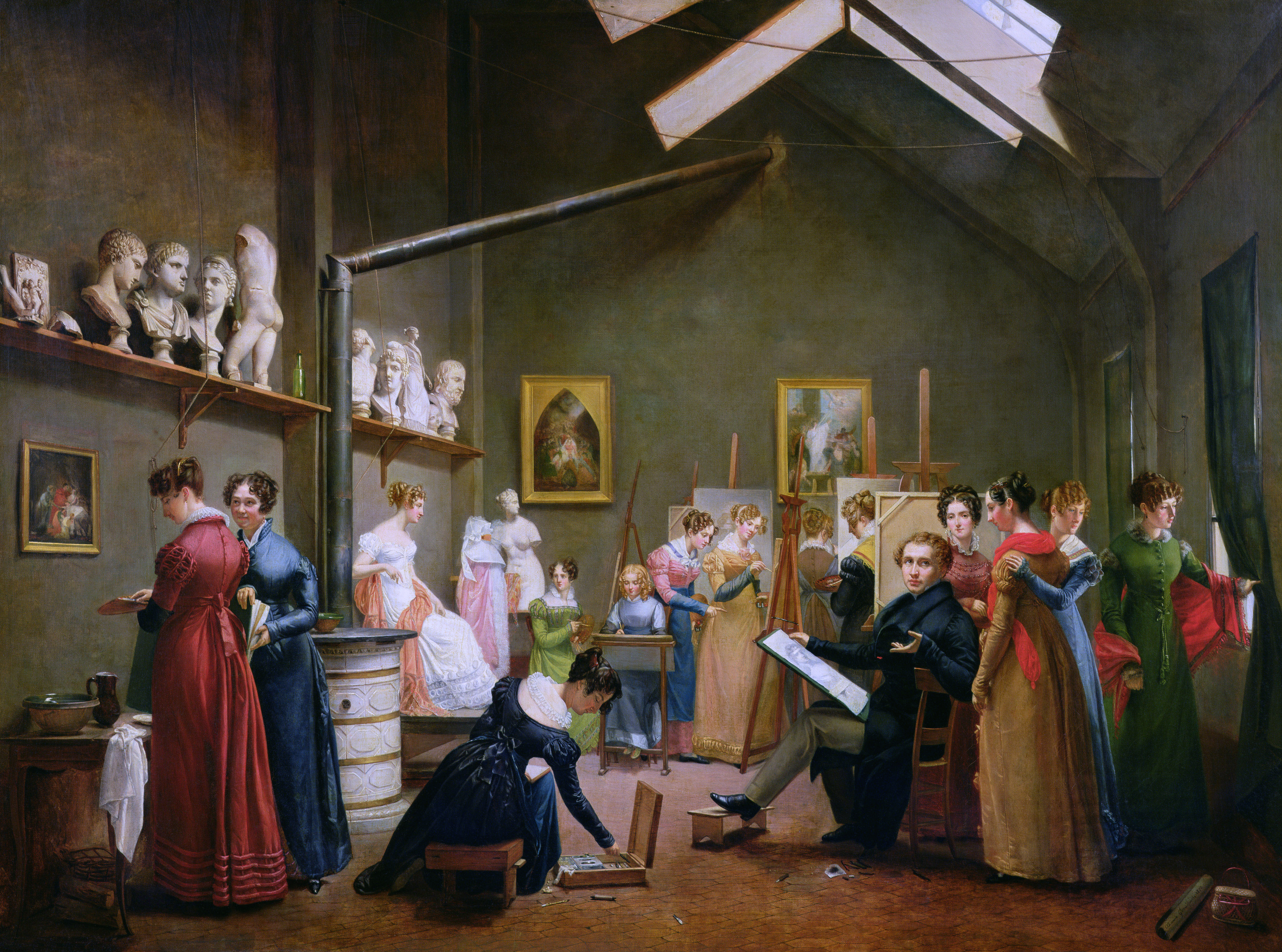
The Studio of Abel de Pujol by Adrienne Marie Louise Grandpierre-Deverzy

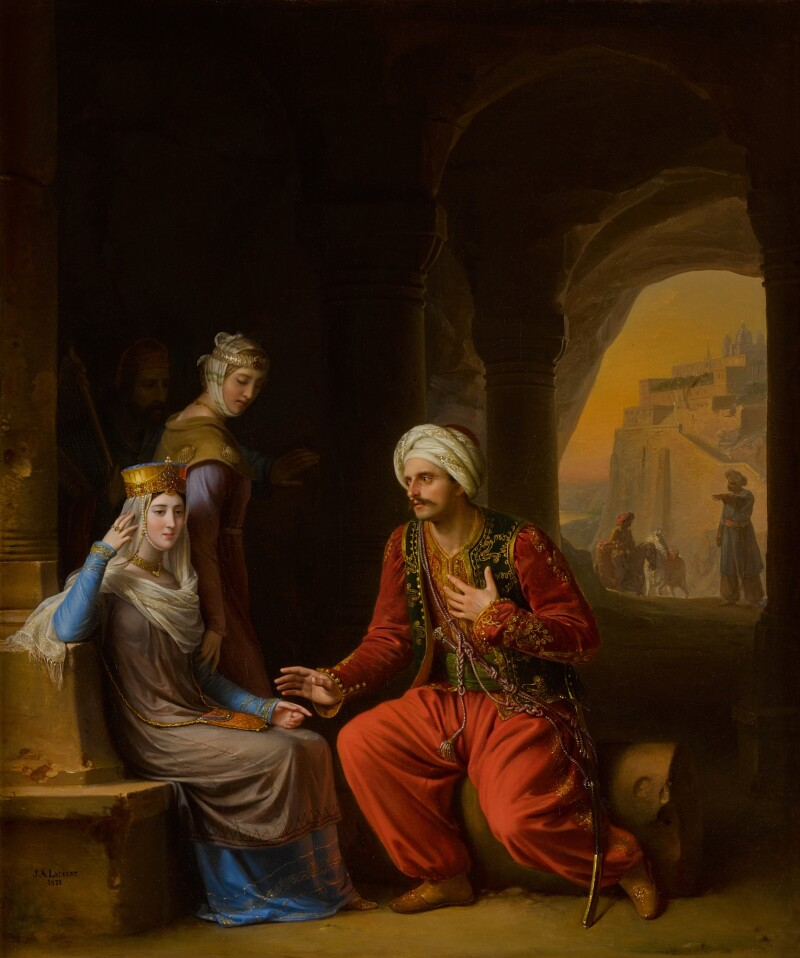
Meeting Between Eleanor of Guyenne with the Sultan of Iconia by Jean Antoine Laurent

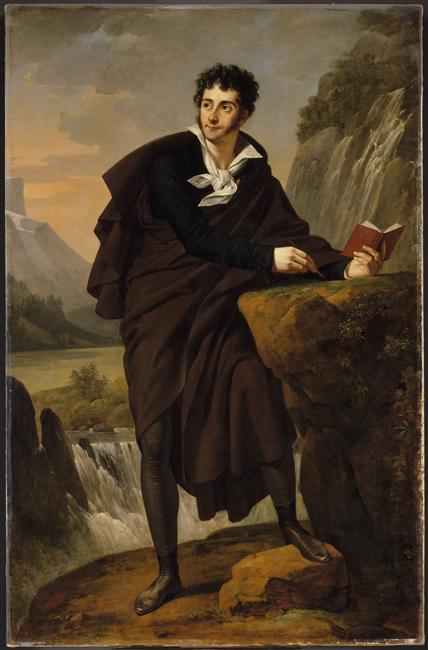
Portrait of Charles-Victor Prévost d'Arlincourt by Robert Lefèvre

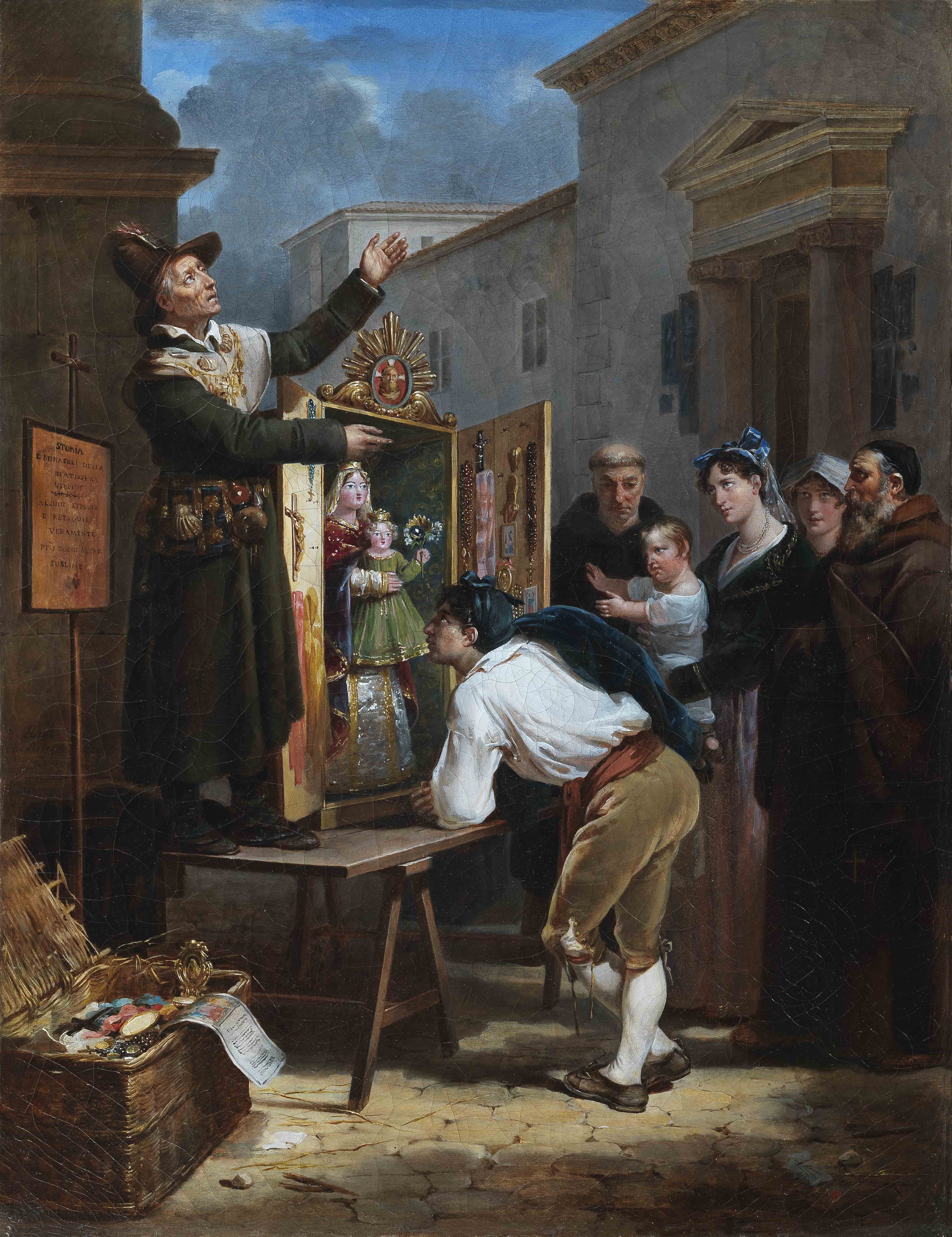
Vendeur de reliques à Rome by Hortense Haudebourt-Lescot

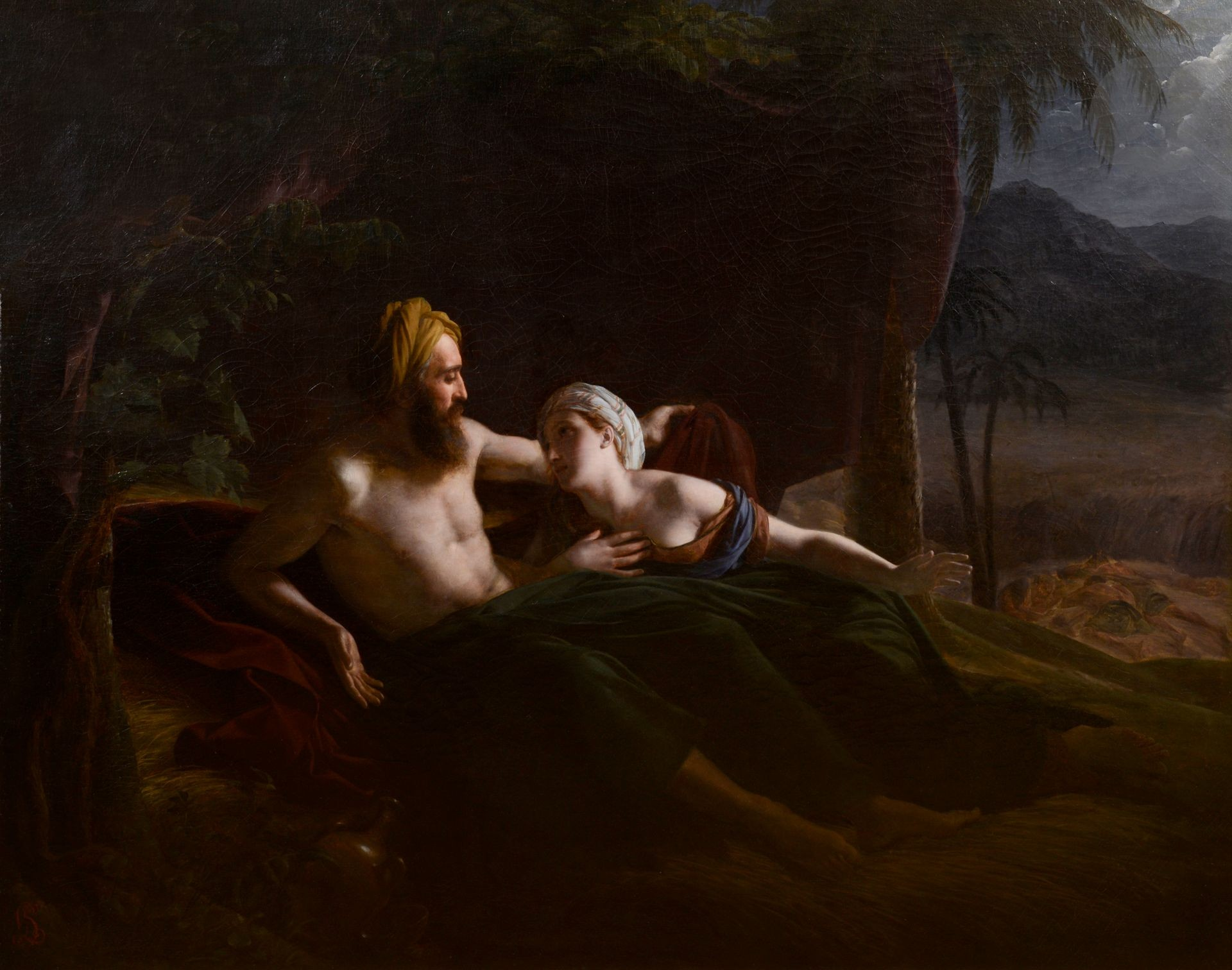
Ruth and Booz by Louis Hersent

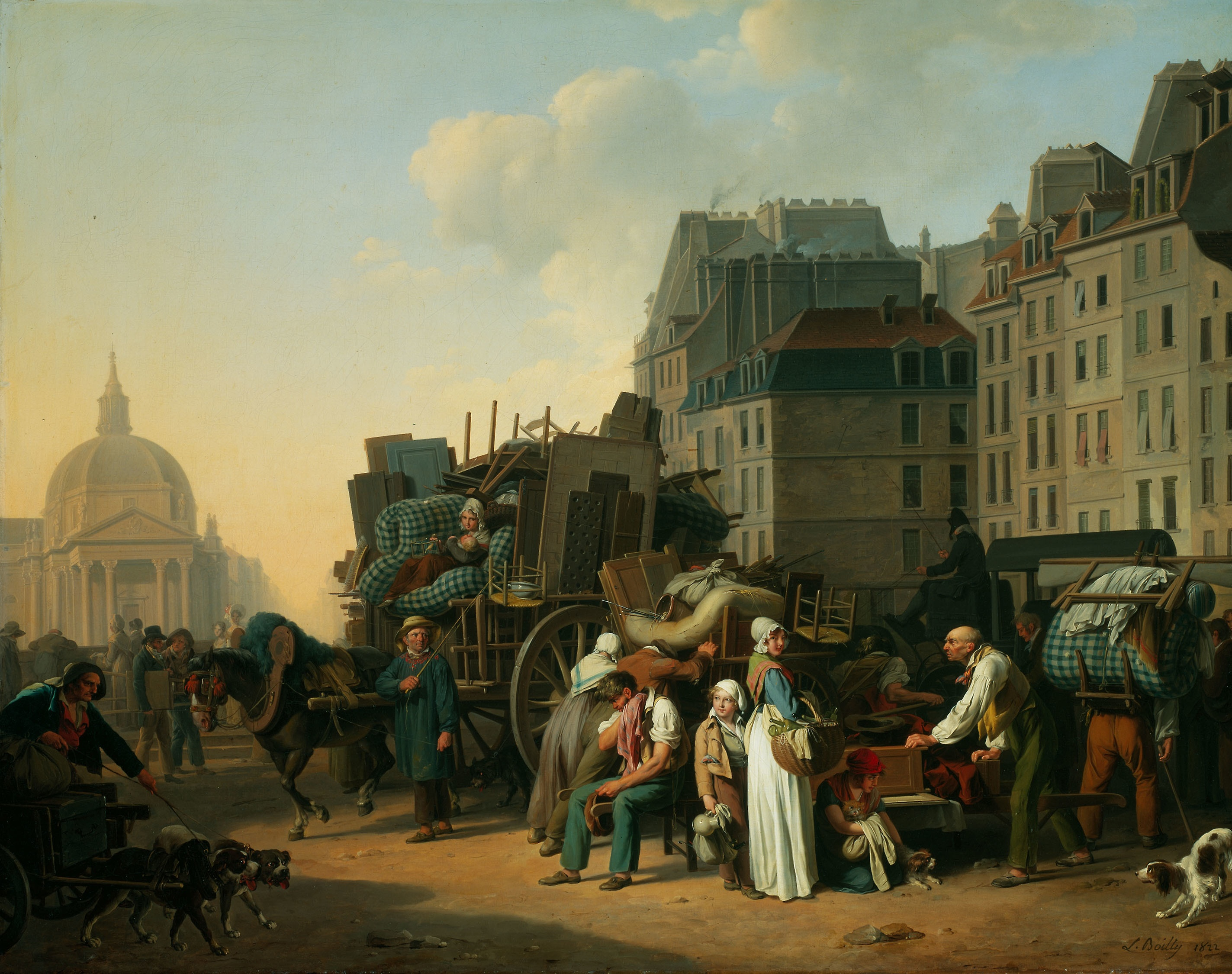
Moving Day by Louis-Léopold Boilly

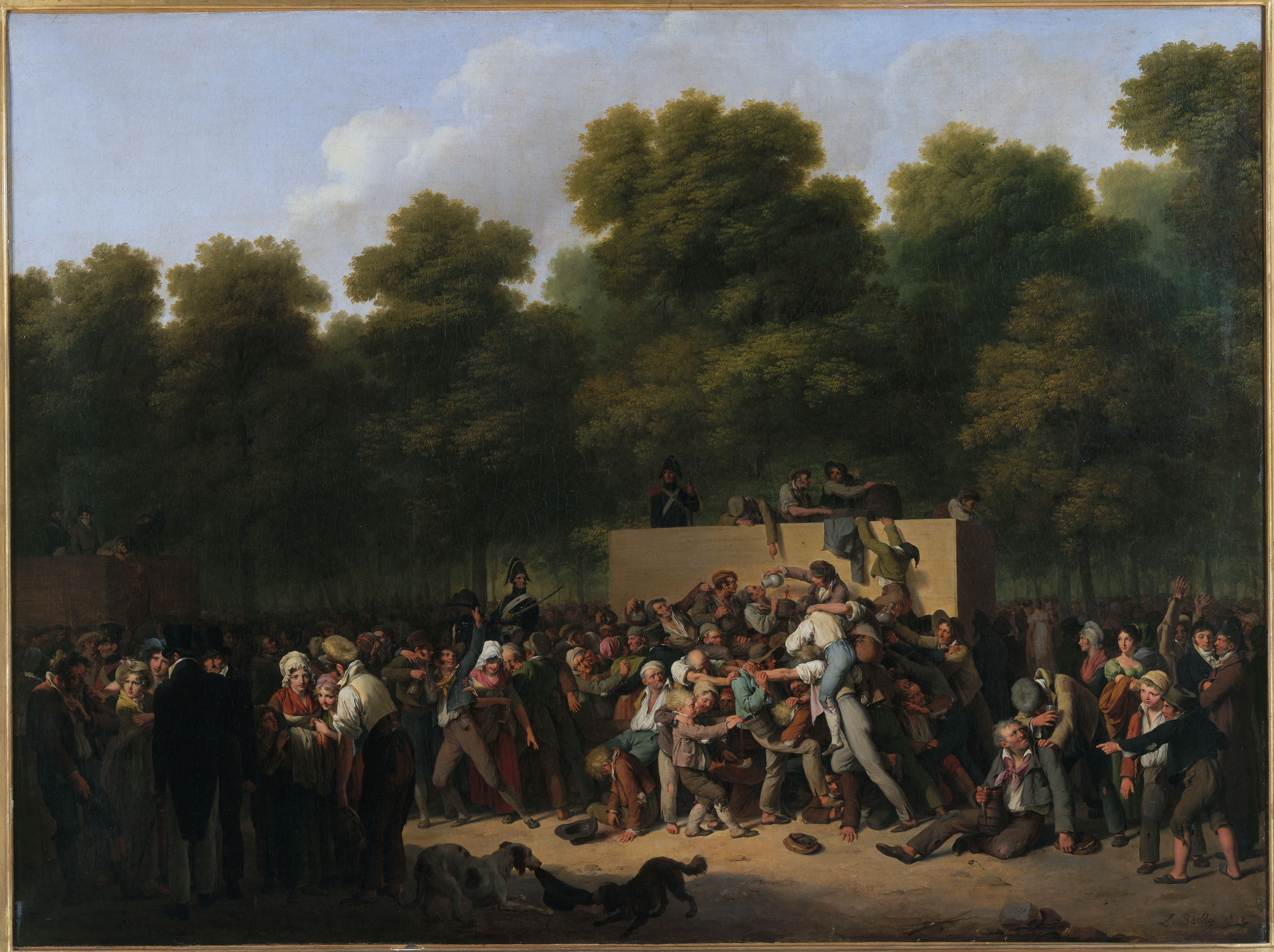
Distribution of Wine and Food on the Champs-Elysées by Louis-Léopold Boilly

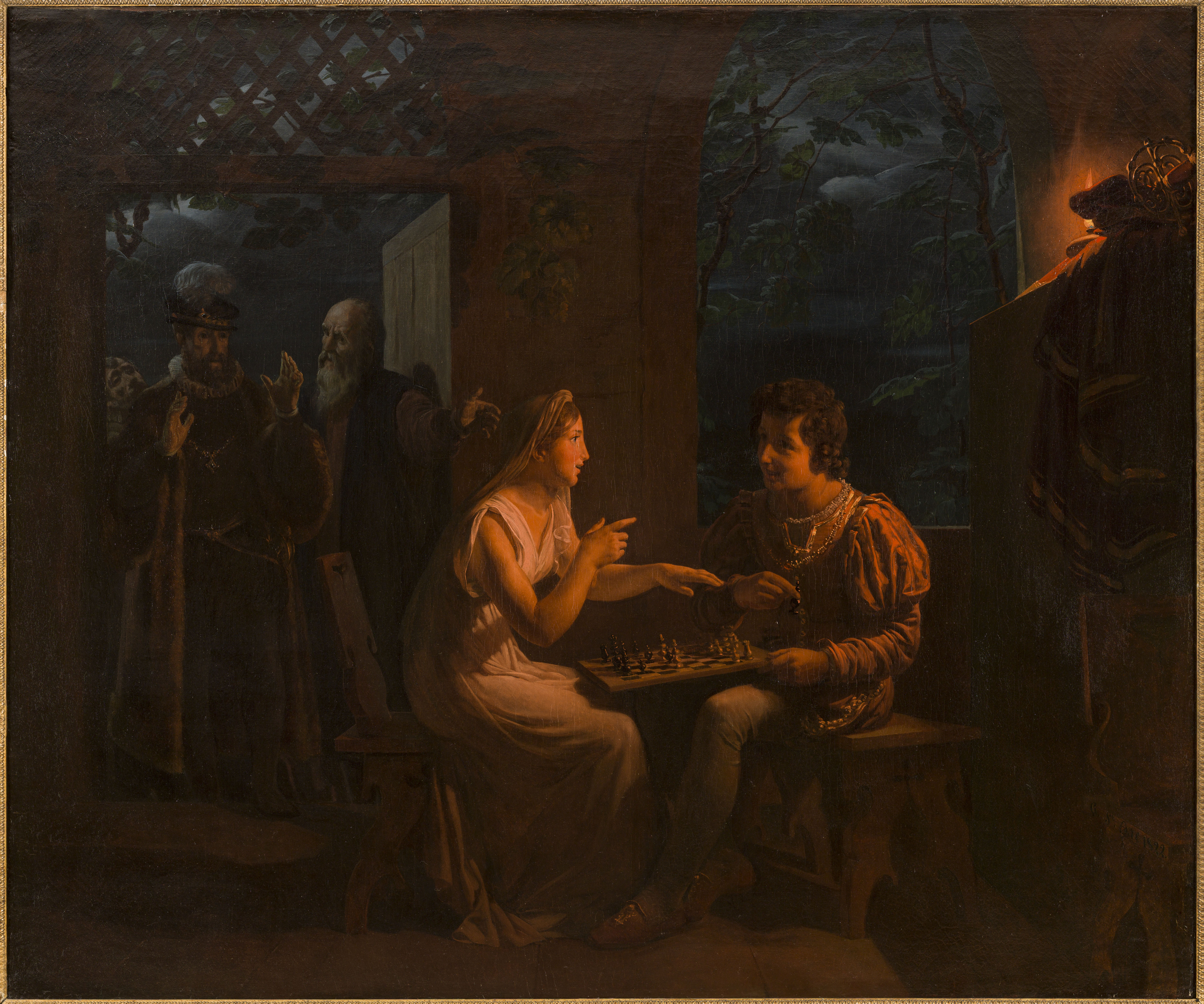
Miranda Playing Chess with Ferdinand by Gillot Saint-Evre

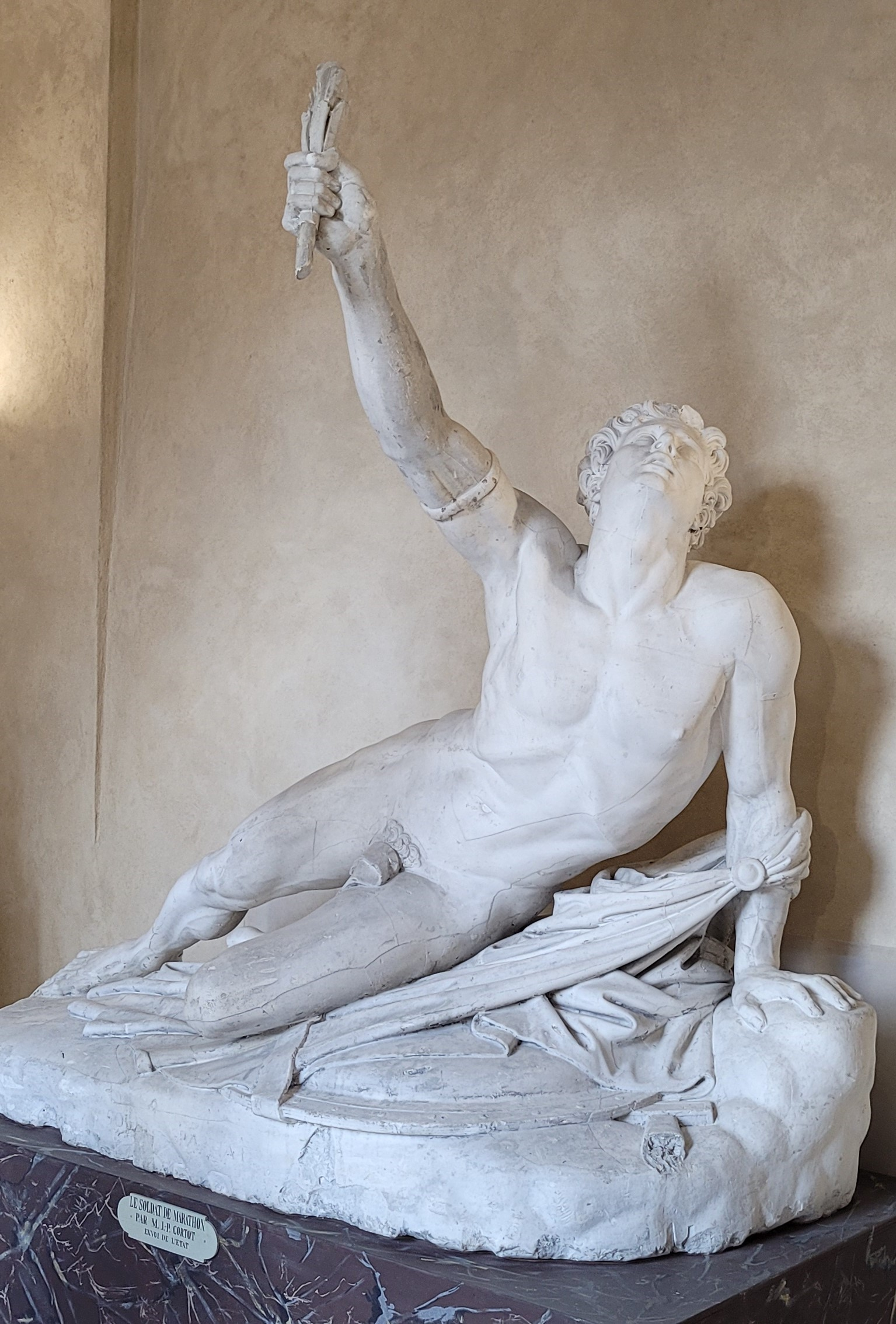
Soldat de Marathon by Jean-Pierre Cortot

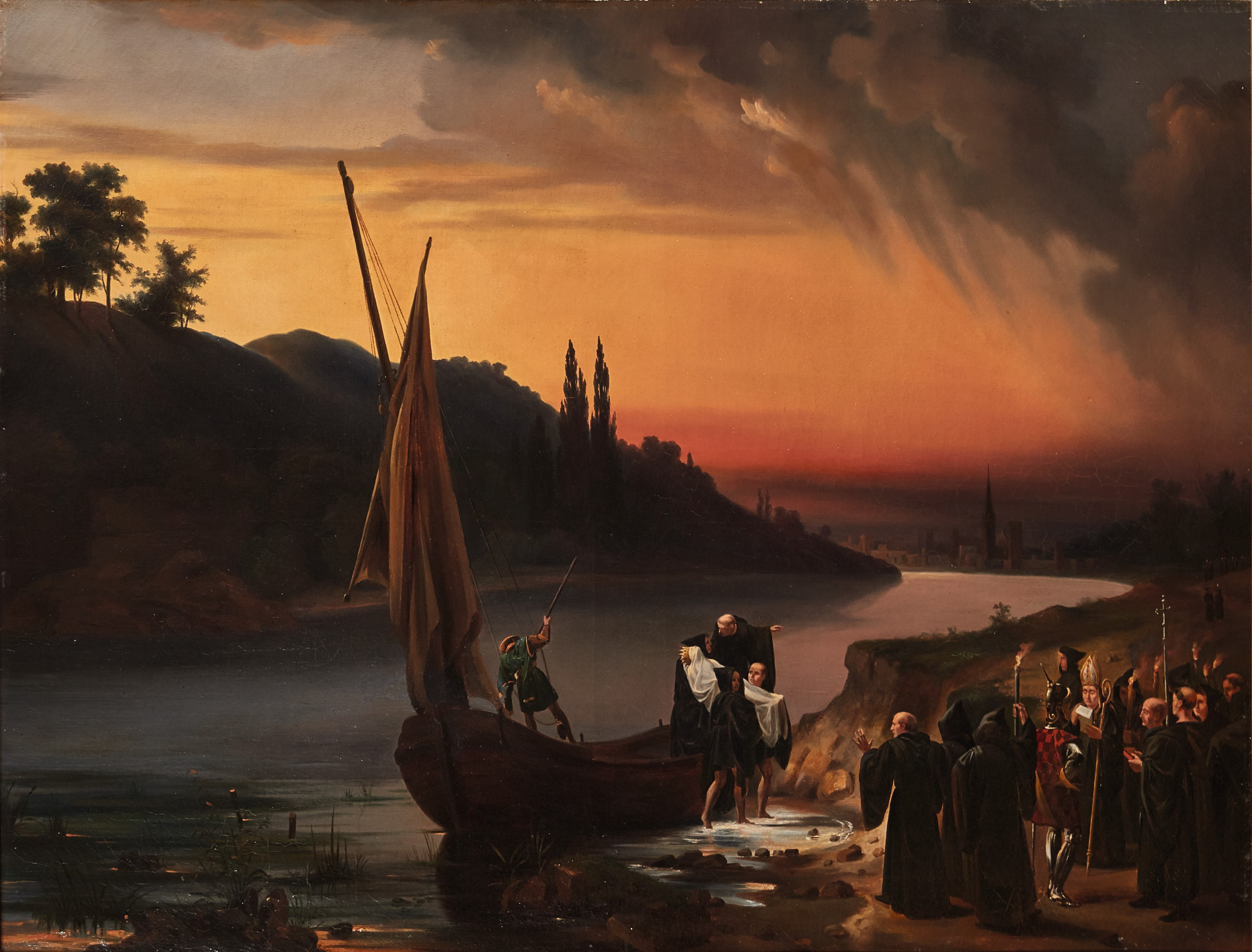
Le Convoi d'Isabeau de Bavière by Henri-Édouard Truchot

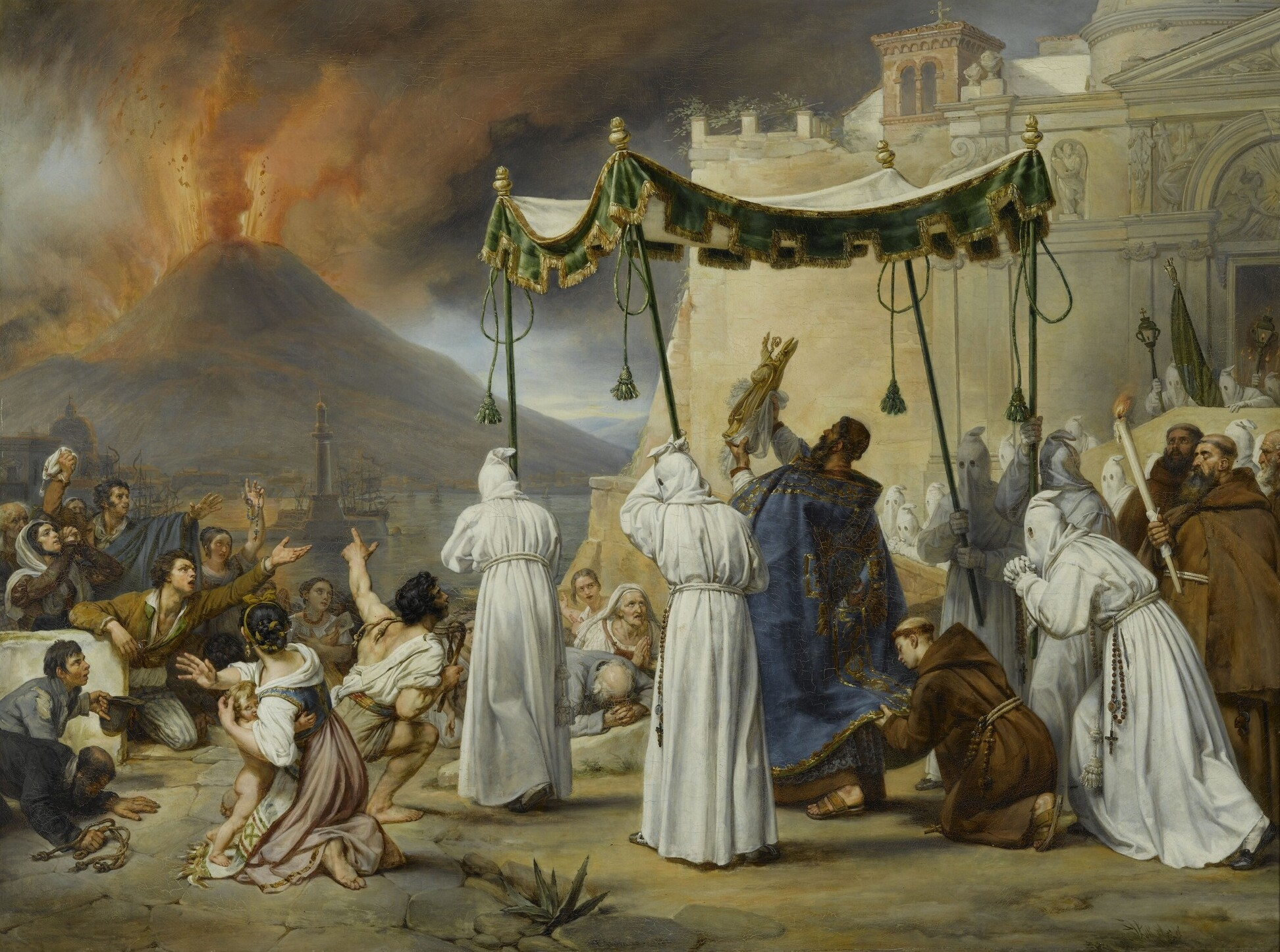
Procession of Saint Januarius During an Eruption of Vesuvius by Antoine Jean-Baptiste Thomas

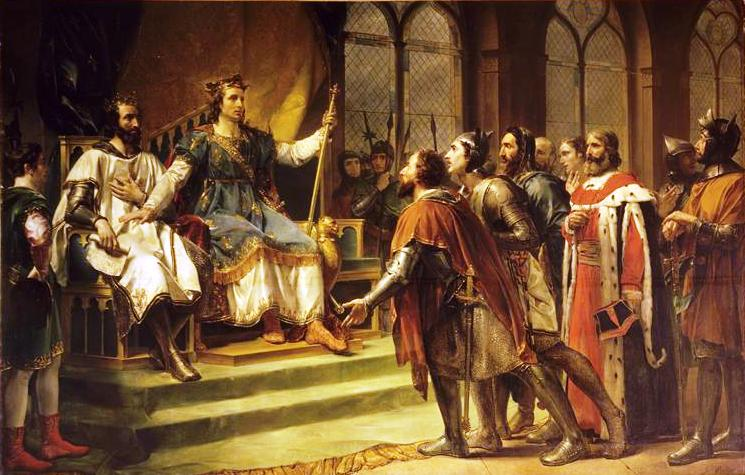
Saint Louis Mediating Between the King of England and His Barons by Georges Rouget

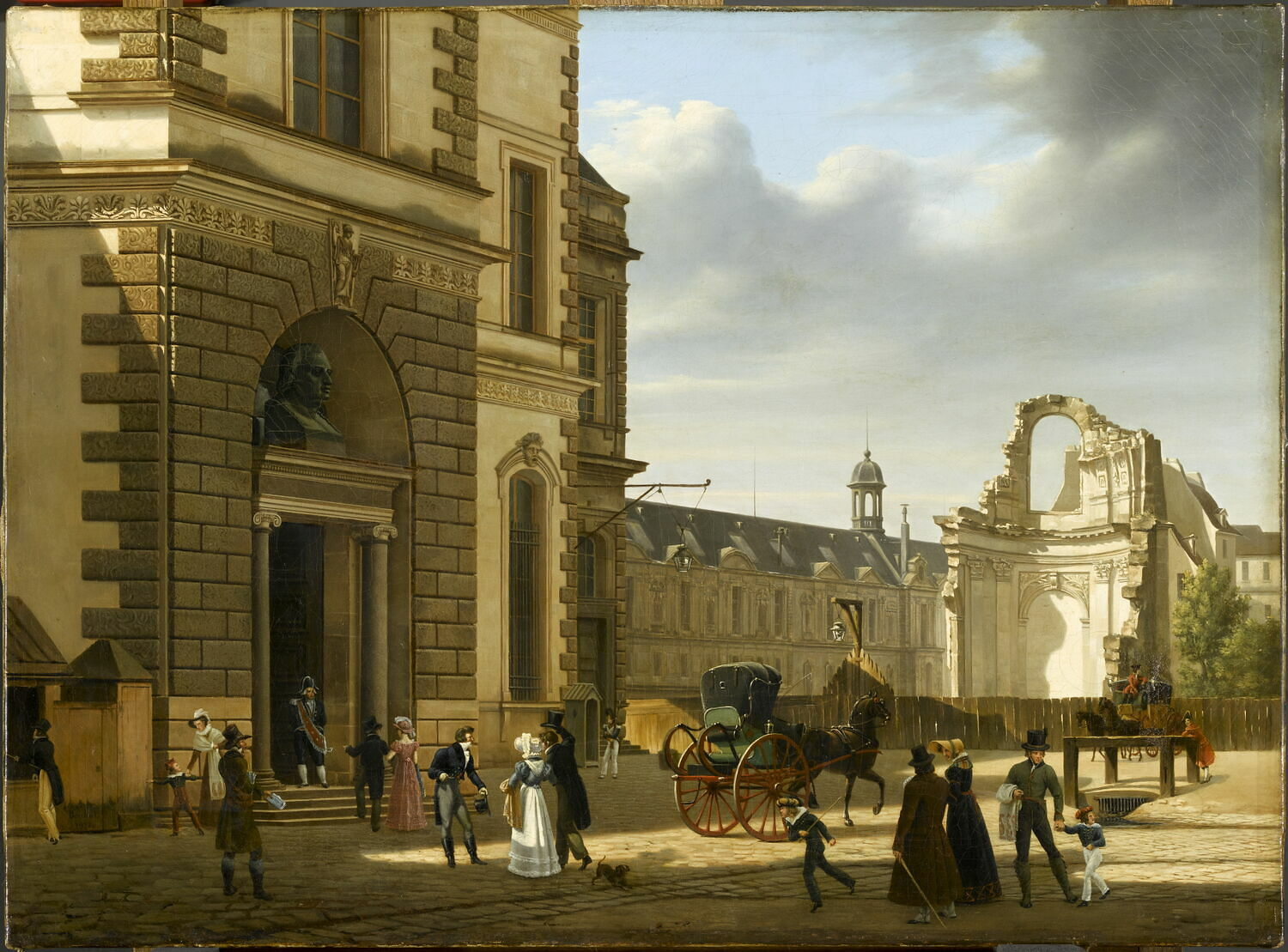
View of the Main Entrance to the Royal Museum by Étienne Bouhot

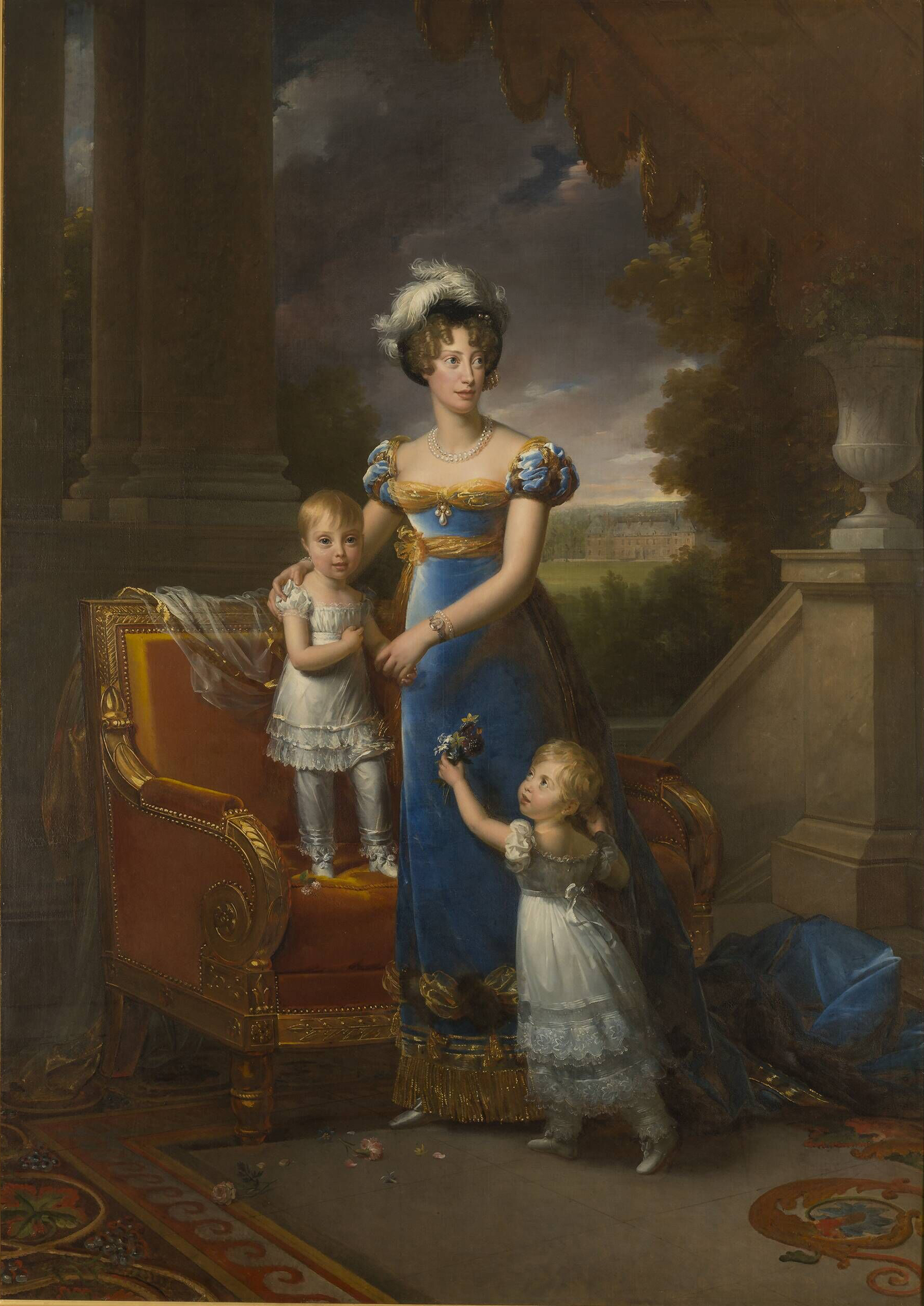
The Duchess of Berry and Her Children by François Gérard

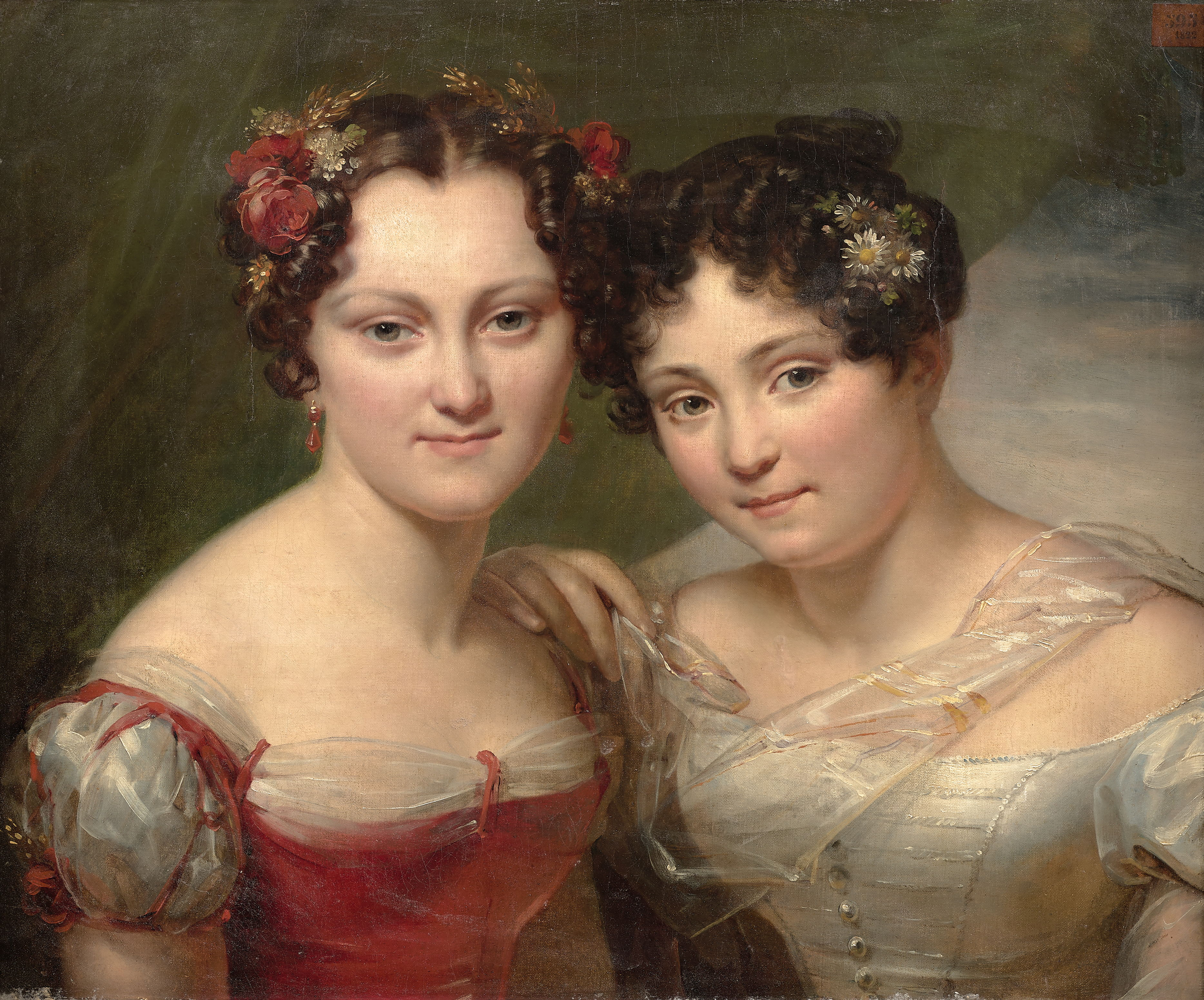
The sisters Louise Christine and Louise Emilie de Lafontaine, by Marie-Éléonore Godefroid

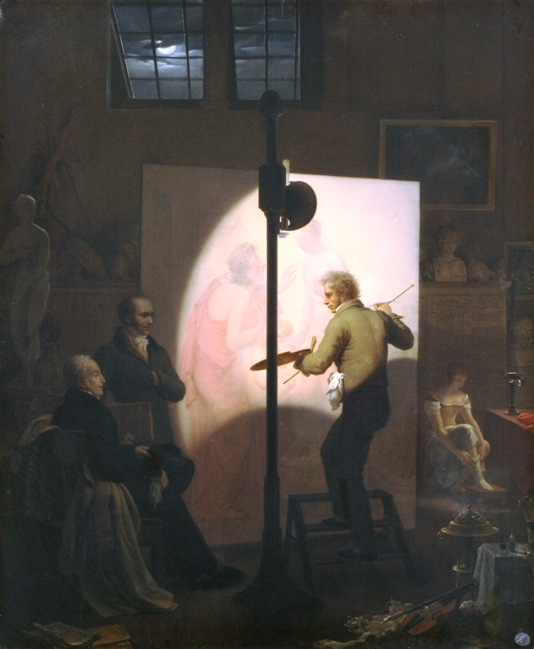
Girodet Painting 'Pygmalion and Galatea' In the Presence of Sommariva by François-Louis Dejuinne

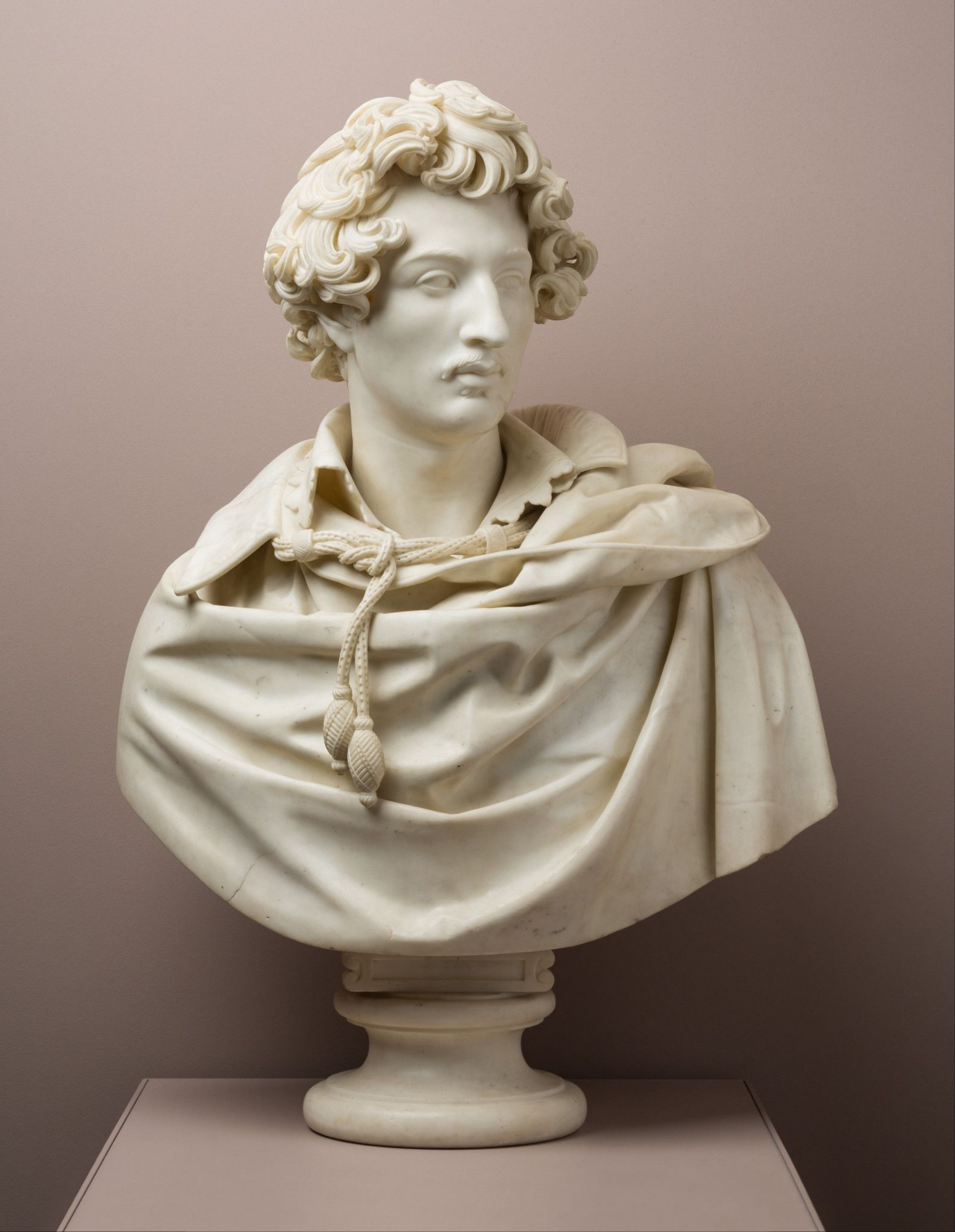
Count Alcide de la Rivallière by Jean Baptiste Joseph De Bay

== See also ==
- Royal Academy Exhibition of 1822, a contemporaneous exhibition held at Somerset House in London
- Category:Artworks exhibited at the Salon of 1822

== Bibliography ==
- Boime, Albert. Art in an Age of Counterrevolution, 1815-1848. University of Chicago Press, 2004.
- Bury, Stephen (ed.) Benezit Dictionary of British Graphic Artists and Illustrators, Volume 1. OUP, 2012.
- Harkett, Daniel & Hornstein, Katie (ed.) Horace Vernet and the Thresholds of Nineteenth-Century Visual Culture. Dartmouth College Press, 2017.
- Murray, Christopher John. Encyclopedia of the Romantic Era, 1760-1850, Volume 2. Taylor & Francis, 2004.
- Noon, Patrick & Bann, Stephen. Constable to Delacroix: British Art and the French Romantics. Tate, 2003.
- Samuels, Maurice. The Spectacular Past: Popular History and the Novel in Nineteenth-Century France. Cornell University Press, 2018.
