= Distribution of Wine and Food on the Champs-Elysées =

Painting by Louis-Léopold Boilly

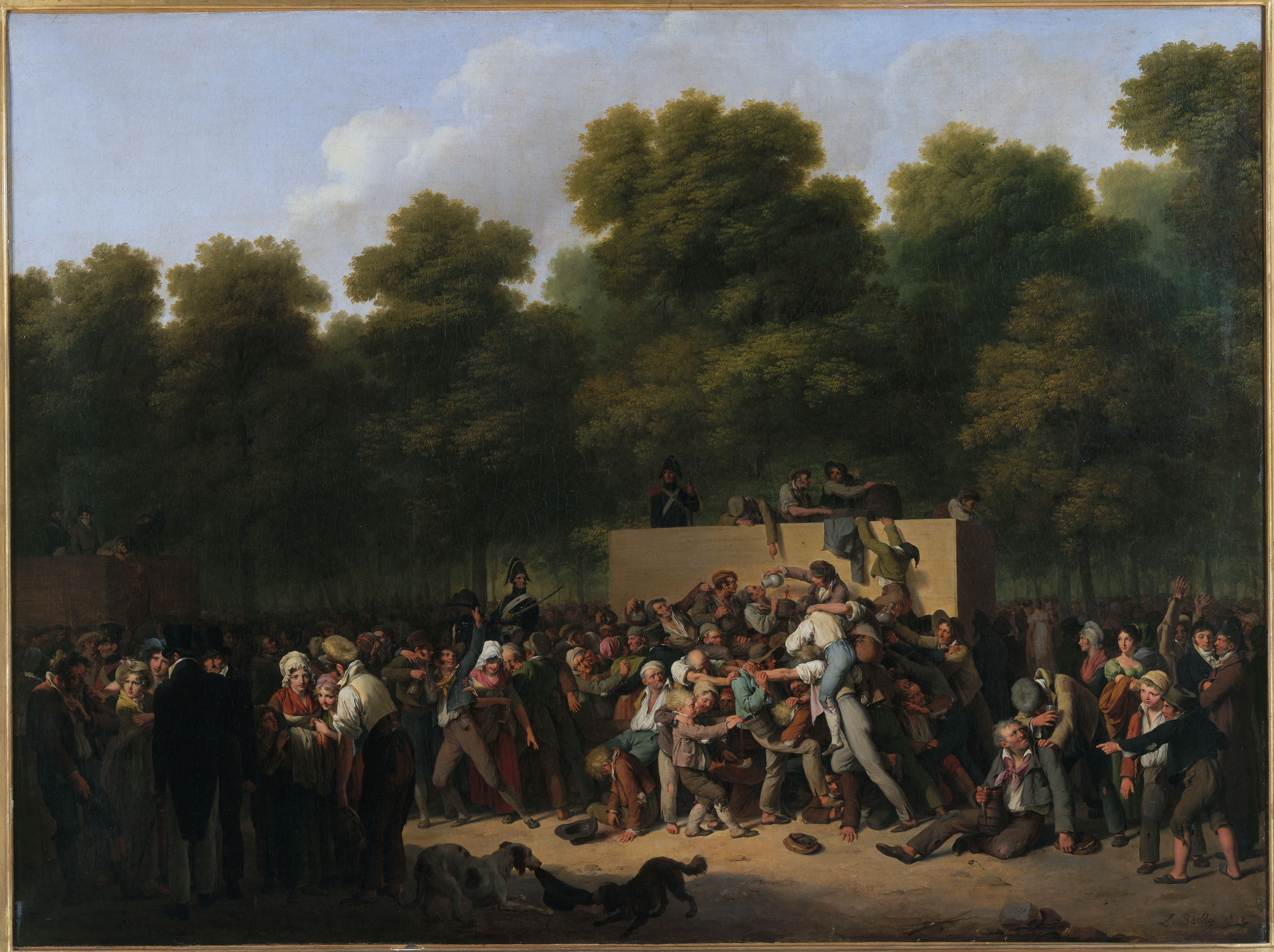
- Artist: Louis-Léopold Boilly
- Year: 1822
- Type: Oil on canvas, genre painting
- Dimensions: 97 cm × 129 cm (38 in × 51 in)
- Location: Musée Carnavalet; Paris

Distribution of Wine and Food on the Champs-Elysées (French: Distribution de vin et de comestibles aux Champs-Elysées) is an 1822 genre painting by the French artist Louis-Léopold Boilly. It shows a scene on the Champs-Elysées in Paris during the Fête du Roi, when wine and food were issued to the populace. It depicts the disorderly crowd clambering over each other to gain access to the food and alcohol. During the Restoration era, the ceremony was held annually on 25 August to commemorate Saint Louis.

It was exhibited at the Salon of 1822 at the Louvre along with another of Boilly's paintings Moving Day. Today it is in the collection of the Musée Carnavalet in Paris, having been acquired in 1902.

== Bibliography ==
- Davidson, Denise Z. France After Revolution: Urban Life, Gender, and the New Social Order. Harvard University Press, 2007.
- Noon, Patrick & Bann, Stephen. Constable to Delacroix: British Art and the French Romantics. Tate, 2003.
- Whitlum- Cooper, Francesca. Boilly: Scenes of Parisian Life. National Gallery Company, 2019.
