= Jean Antoine Laurent =

French painter

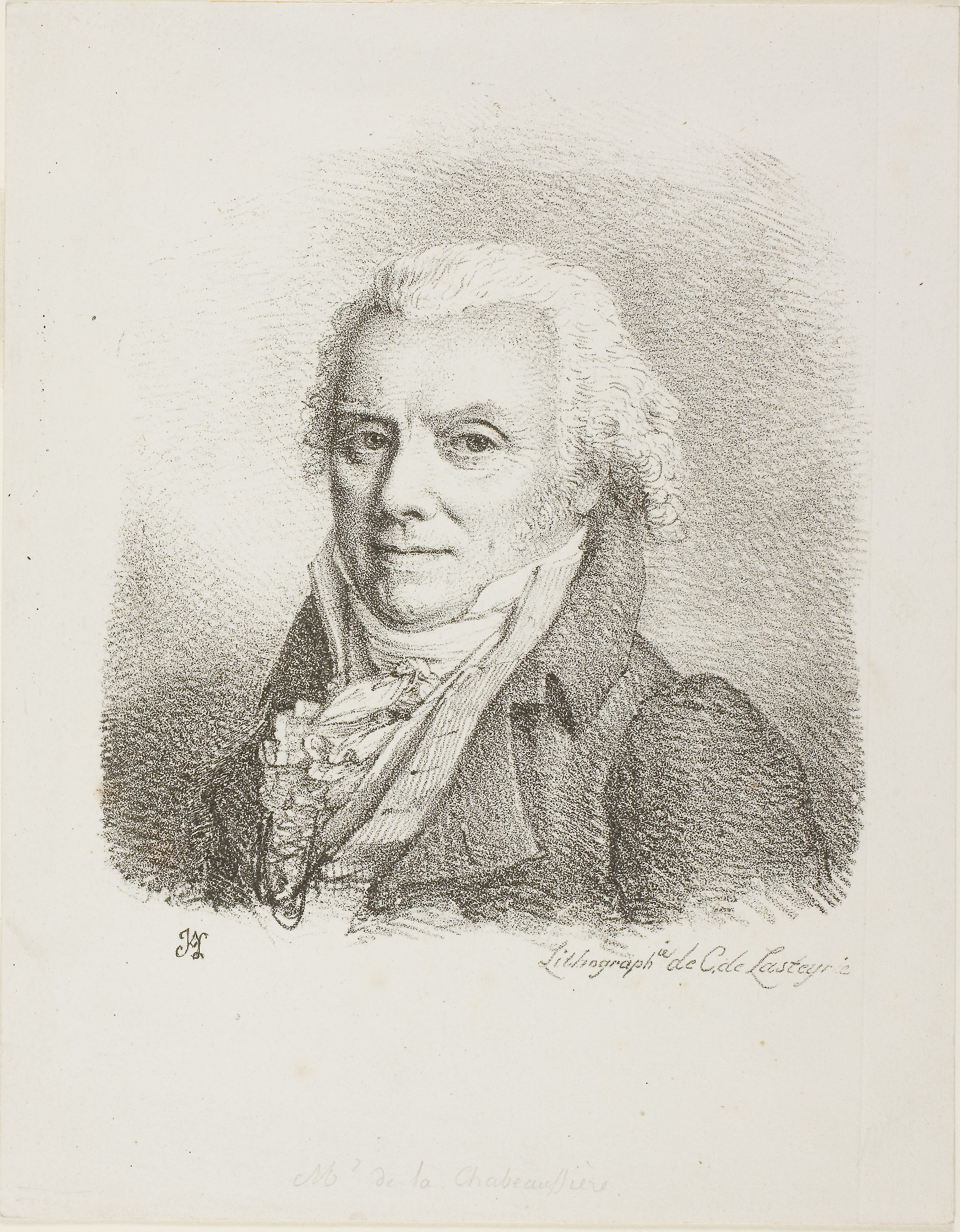
Self-portrait of Jean Antoine Laurent

Jean Antoine Laurent (Baccarat, 31 October 1763 – Epinal, 11 February 1832) was a French miniaturist and painter.

== Biography ==
He was born in Baccarat, Meurthe-et-Moselle, France into a family of artists. He studied in Nancy, where he was a pupil of Jean-Baptiste Claudot and Jean-Francois Durand. He settled in Paris in 1785 and exhibited in the Salon from 1791 to 1831 obtaining a first class medal in 1808. He lived first in 487, rue Saint Nicaise and then in rue Duphot and in 30 place du Carrousel. In his long career he tried his hand non only as miniaturist but also as history and genre painter. He married Marie Antoinette Gueliot and had four children. Pauline was the elder, Emma was a miniaturist, Paul studied in the Ecole Polytechnique but was expelled in 1814, Jules was a sculptor and director of Epinal Museum. Lauronce refused to work for the House of Bourbon and so was granted protection by Empress Josephine and Queen Hortense de Beauharnais. He was a teacher of drawing in the Ecole forestiere of Nancy, director of the drawing school of Epinal, President of the Societe Academique des Enfants d’Apollon and director of the Epinal Museum, town where he lived in 90, rue de Bourbon. In that period he obtained the Legion of Honour. In 1826 he published a text on lithography. He was one of the few French miniaturists who painted on large surfaces of ivory or parchment. In fact among his subjects there were also equestrian portraits. He painted also with the technique of fixé sous verre, in which the likeness is painted in oils on fine silk fabric and then glued to the inside of a bombé glass.

== Artwork ==
One of the main features of Laurent's works is influenced by Jean-Jacques Rousseau’s writings, which rejected gallantry. The result was soft, sensitive and pensive expression of his sitters in the late 1780s and 1790s. A sort of pre-Romantic style away from the grandeur and austerity toward free expression of emotion. The human inner side becomes the protagonist of his portrait miniatures and we can read it not only in the deep gaze but also in the imperceptible movements of the lips of the many protagonists of his works.

== Works ==
- “Portrait de Mirabeau”, 1791, watercolor on ivory, Louvre
- “Portrait of a Young Woman”, ca. 1795, watercolor on ivory, Metropolitan Museum of Art
- “Young Woman with the Girl at the Window (Prayer)”, 1808, watercolor on ivory, Hermitage Museum
- “Untitled", watercolor on ivory, Artwork on USEUM
- “Portrait of a Woman Reclining on a Sofa”, c. 1804, watercolor on ivory,
- “The Three Sisters: Finette, Babillarde and Nonchalante (Primary Title)”, watercolor on ivory,
- “Marie-Louise of Austria, Empress of the French”, 1810- 1815, watercolor on ivory,
- “Lady with Plumed Straw Hat”, c. 1785, watercolor on ivory,
- “Portrait of unknown lady (ancestor of the banker Georges Mauban) ”, ca 1790, watercolor on ivory, from Georges Mauban (1843 – 1908), art collection.
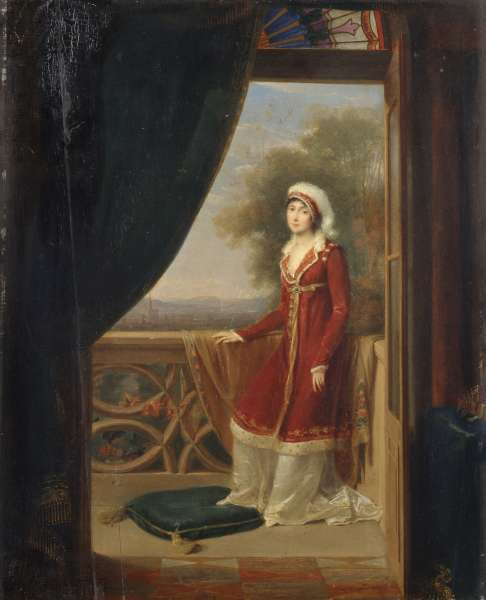
Portrait of Empress Josephine in Strasbourg, 1805-1806

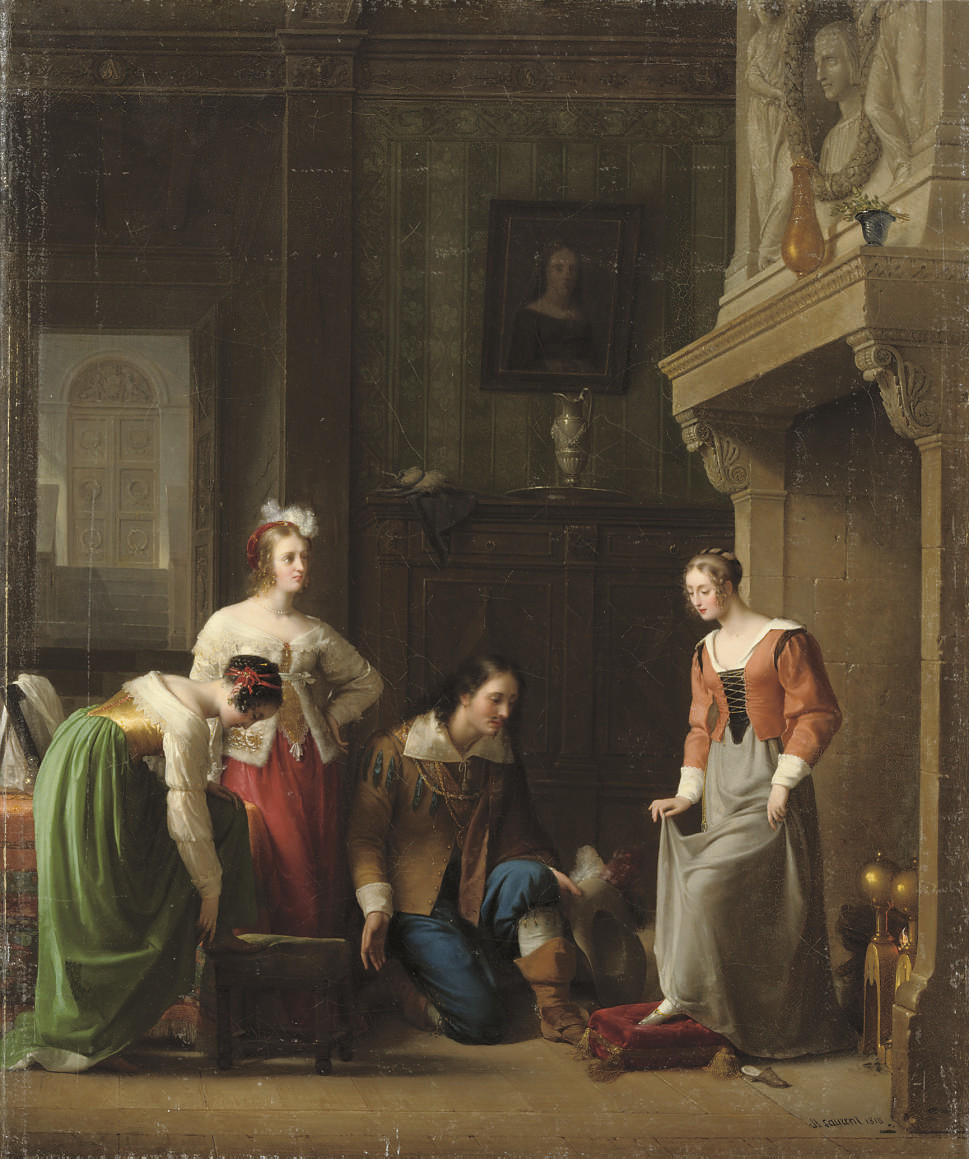
Cinderella, a perfect match, 1818

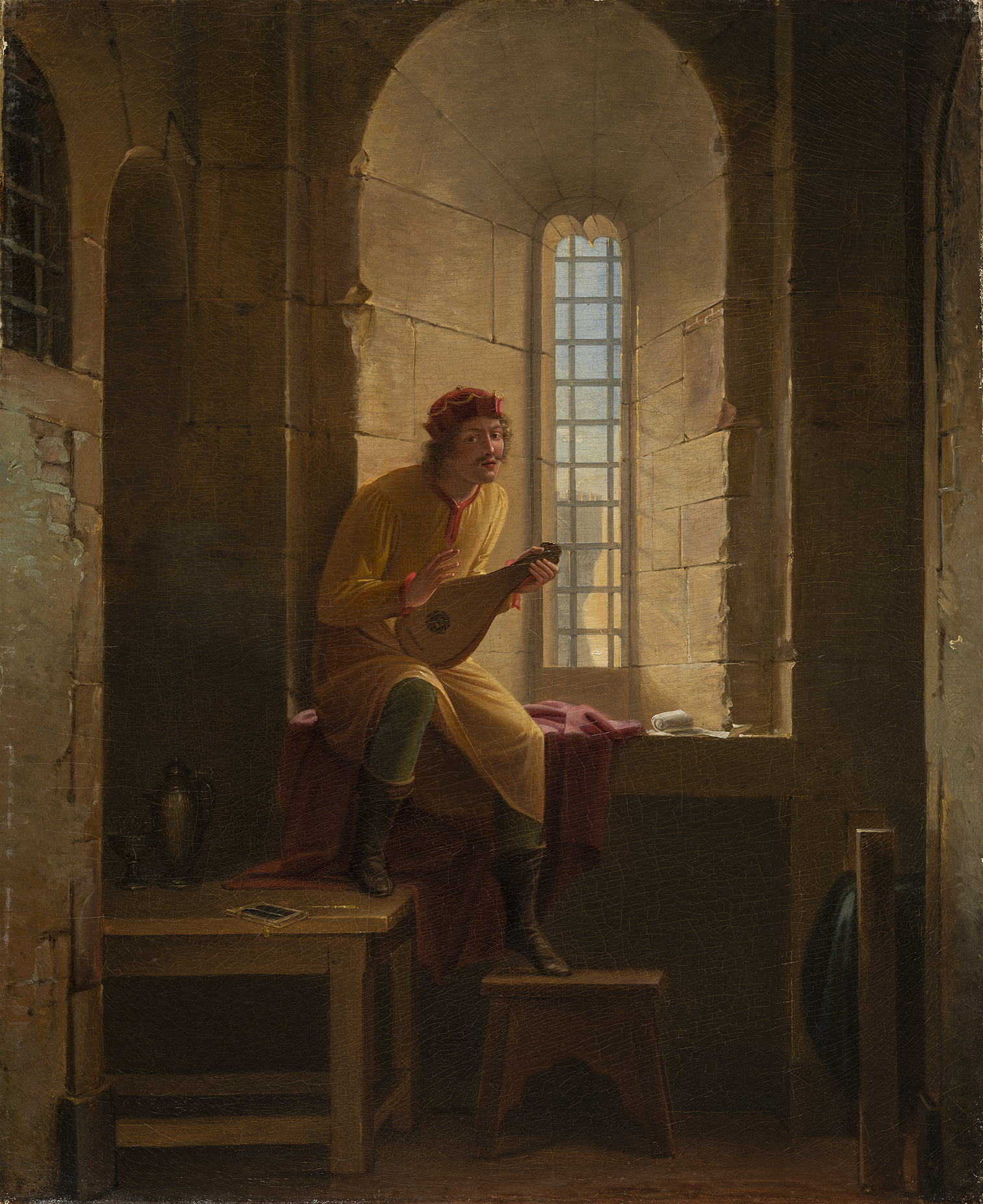
Richard the Lionheart Answers Blondel de Nesle’s Singing, 1822

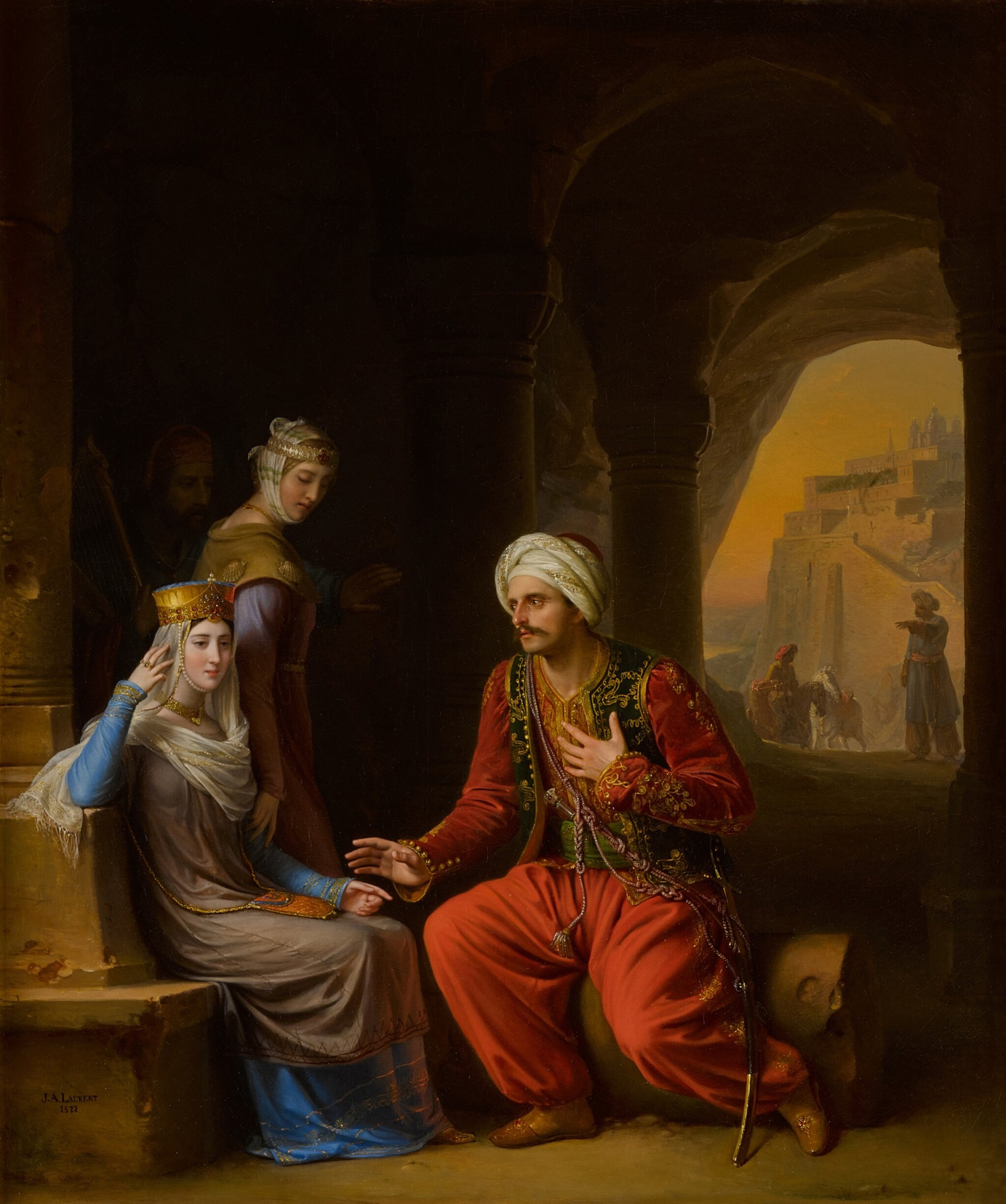
Meeting between Eleanor of Aquitaine and the Sultan of Iconia, Salon of 1822

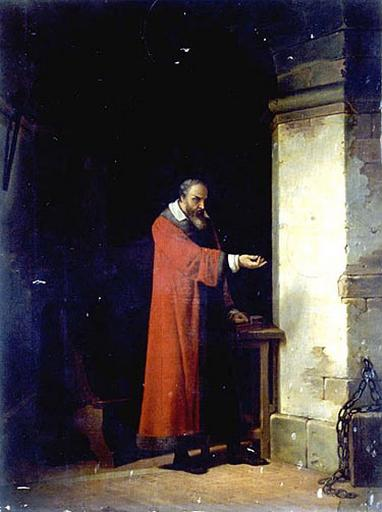
Galileo in his cell, circa 1822

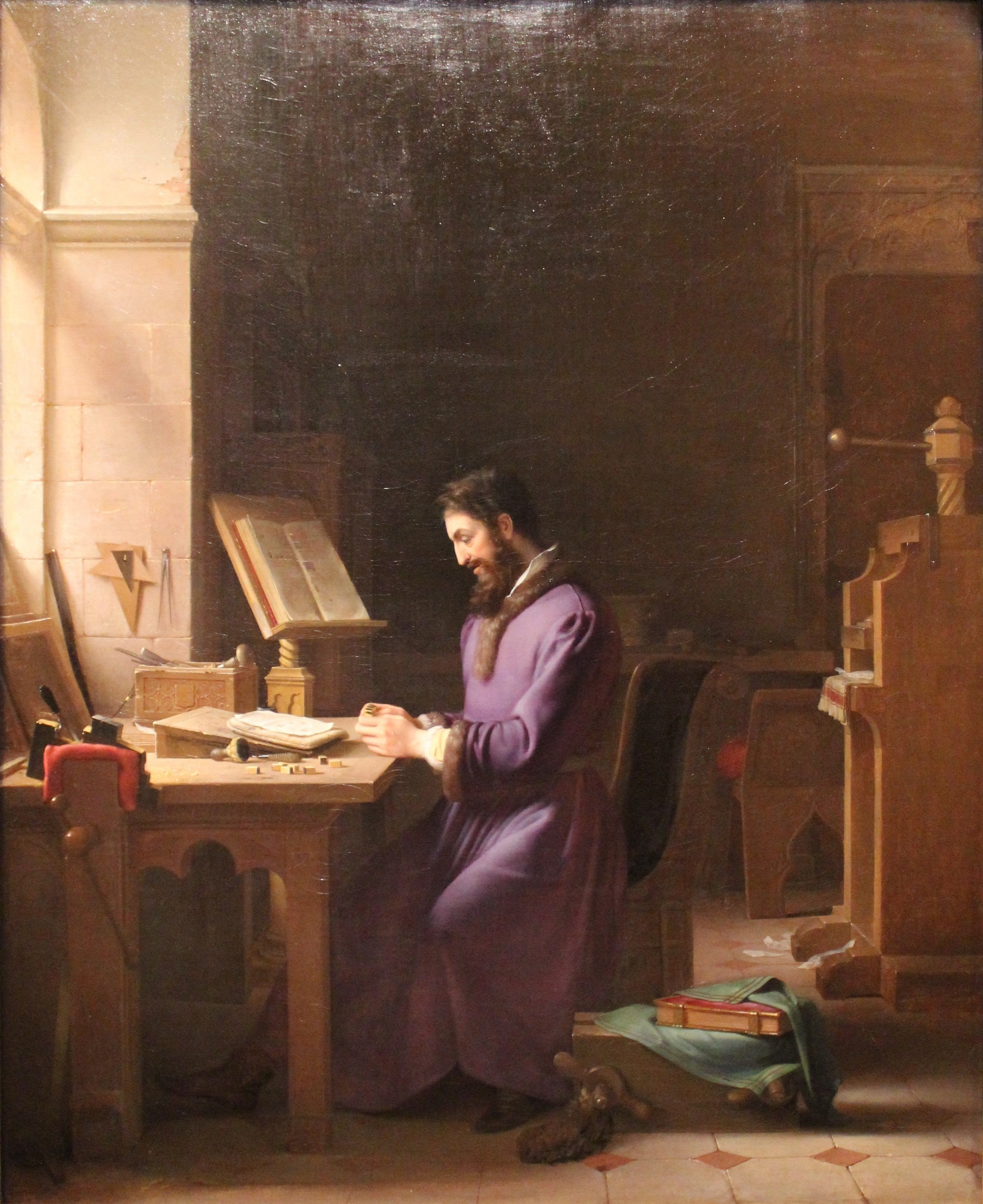
Gutenberg inventing the printing press, 1831
