= Bacchus and Ariadne (Gros) =

Painting by Antoine-Jean Gros

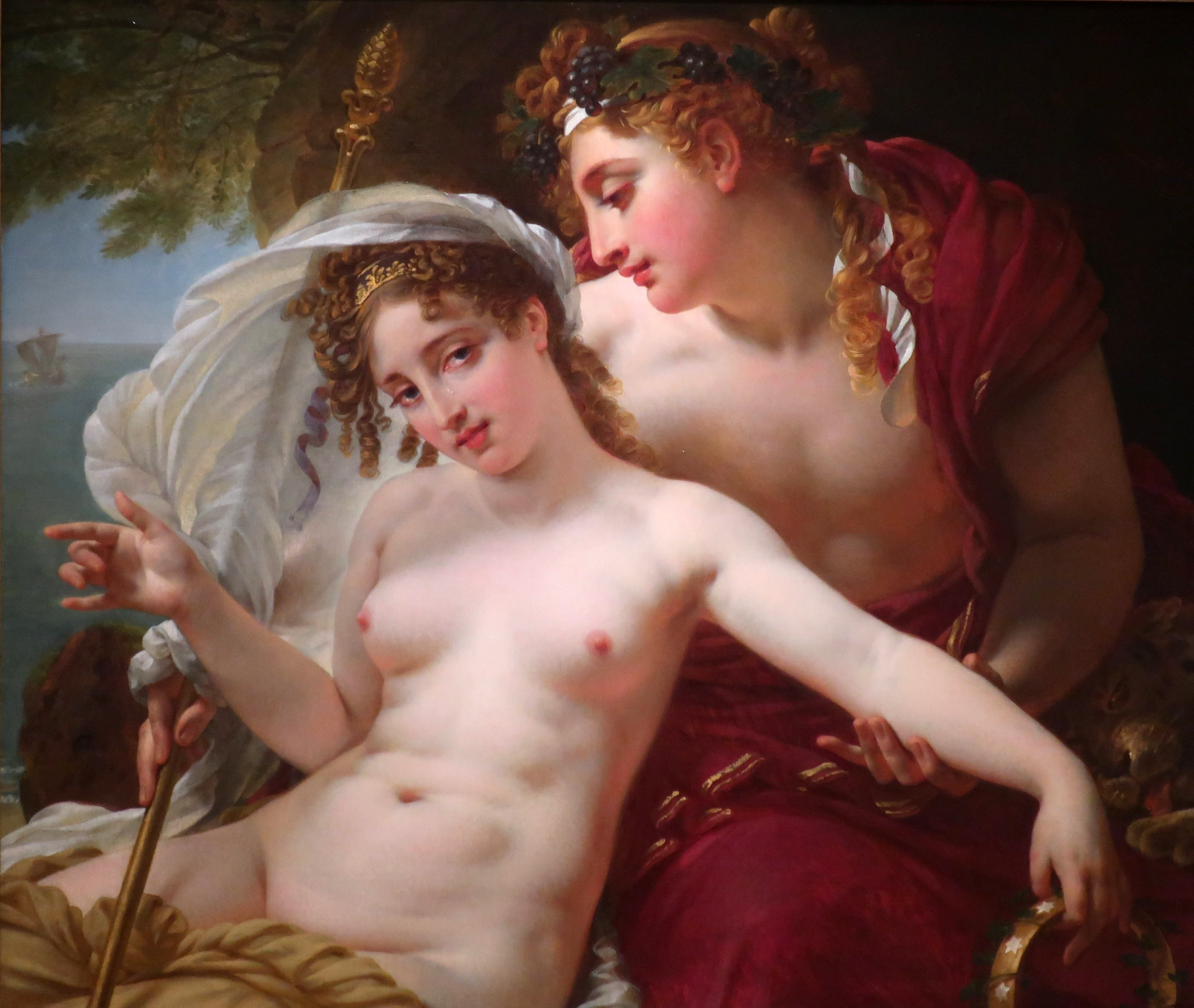
- Artist: Antoine-Jean Gros
- Year: 1820
- Type: Oil on canvas, history painting
- Dimensions: 86 cm × 101.3 cm (34 in × 39.9 in)
- Location: Phoenix Art Museum; Arizona

Bacchus and Ariadne (French: Bacchus et Ariane) is an 1820 oil painting by the French artist Antoine-Jean Gros. Drawing on the traditions of the history painting, it depicts the mythological Ancient Greek figures Bacchus and Ariadne. The latter is being consoled after her lover Theseus abandoned her on the island of Naxos.

A former pupil of Jacques-Louis David, following the latter's departure into exile in Brussels following the French Restoration, Gros became the leading exponent in Paris of David's commitment to Neoclassical art. This was despite the fact that much of his own earlier works veered more the emerging Romantic movement. Even from exile David continued to exert influence over Gros and secured him this commission from the art collector Erwein von Schönborn to produce this work as a companion piece to David's own 1818 picture The Farewell of Telemachus and Eucharis.

A second version was subsequently produced by Gros. This painting was displayed at the Salon of 1822 at the Louvre, in Paris, and is today in the National Gallery of Canada, in Ottawa. The original painting is held in the Phoenix Art Museum, in Phoenix.

== Bibliography ==
- Noon, Patrick & Bann, Stephen. Constable to Delacroix: British Art and the French Romantics. Tate, 2003.
