= Moving Day (painting) =

Painting by Louis-Léopold Boilly

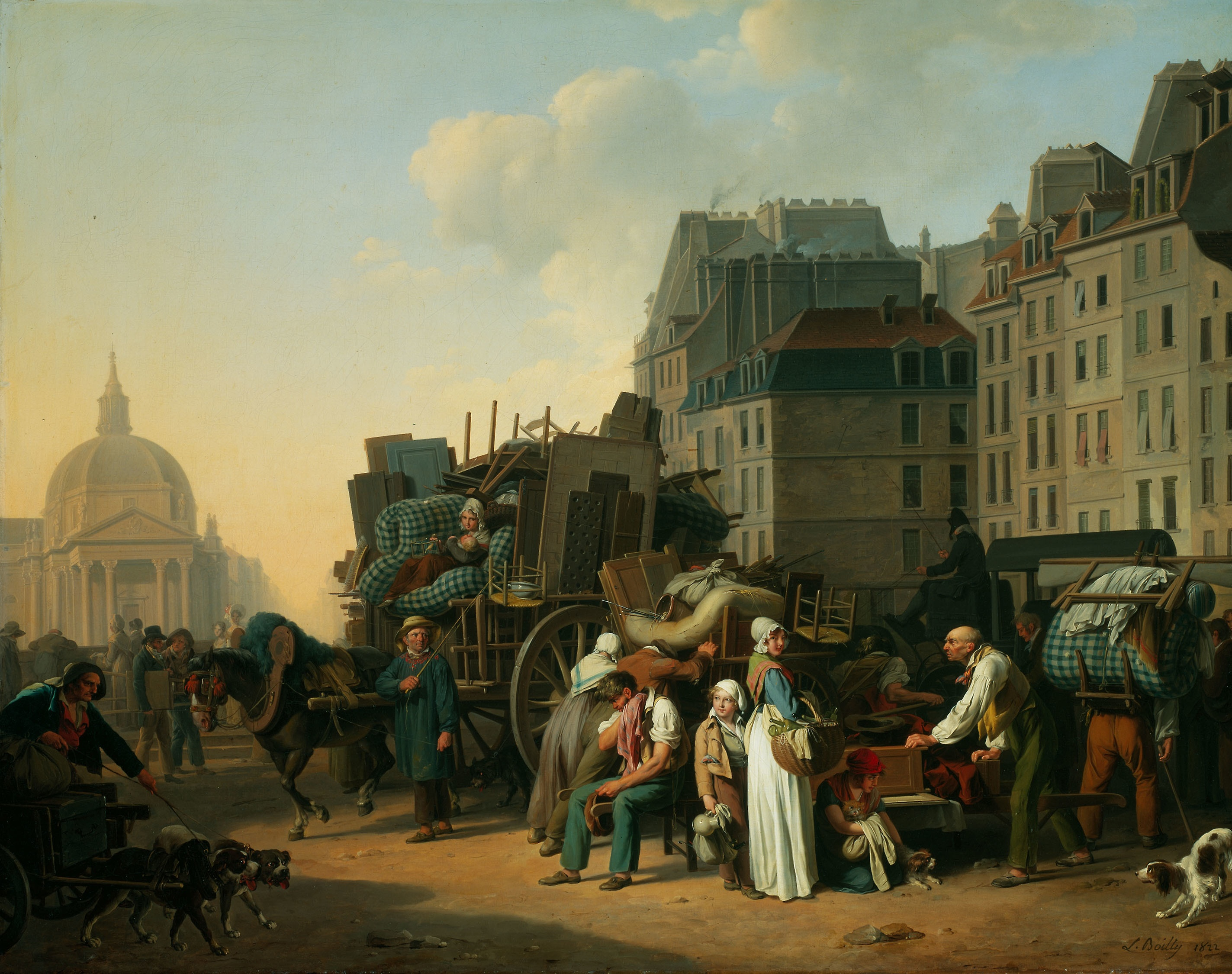
- Artist: Louis-Léopold Boilly
- Year: 1822
- Type: Oil on canvas, genre painting
- Dimensions: 73 cm × 91.7 cm (29 in × 36.1 in)
- Location: Art Institute of Chicago; Chicago

Moving Day or The Movings (French: Les Déménagements) is an oil on canvas genre painting by the French artist Louis-Léopold Boilly, from 1822. It is held in the Art Institute of Chicago, having been acquired in 1982.

== History and description ==
It depicts a Parisian street scene near the Port-au-Blé in the city centre. A family is shown moving with all their possessions, likely due to financial hardship. In ethereal form on the left of the painting, in the form of a capriccio, is the Santa Maria del Popolo in Rome.

Boilly was known for his scenes of the French capital from the Revolutionary era onwards. The work was exhibited at the Salon of 1822 at the Louvre. Boilly was unsuccessful in his hopes that the French government of the Restoration era would purchase the work for the nation.

== Bibliography ==
- Kertzer, David I. & Barbagli, Marzio (ed.) Family Life in the Long Nineteenth Century (1789-1913). Yale University Press, 2001.
- Noon, Patrick & Bann, Stephen. Constable to Delacroix: British Art and the French Romantics. Tate, 2003.
- Pasco, Allan H. Sick Heroes: French Society and Literature in the Romantic Age, 1750-1850. University of Exeter Press, 1997.
- Whitlum- Cooper, Francesca. Boilly: Scenes of Parisian Life. National Gallery Company, 2019.
