= Joseph Vernet Tied to a Mast During a Storm =

Painting by Horace Vernet

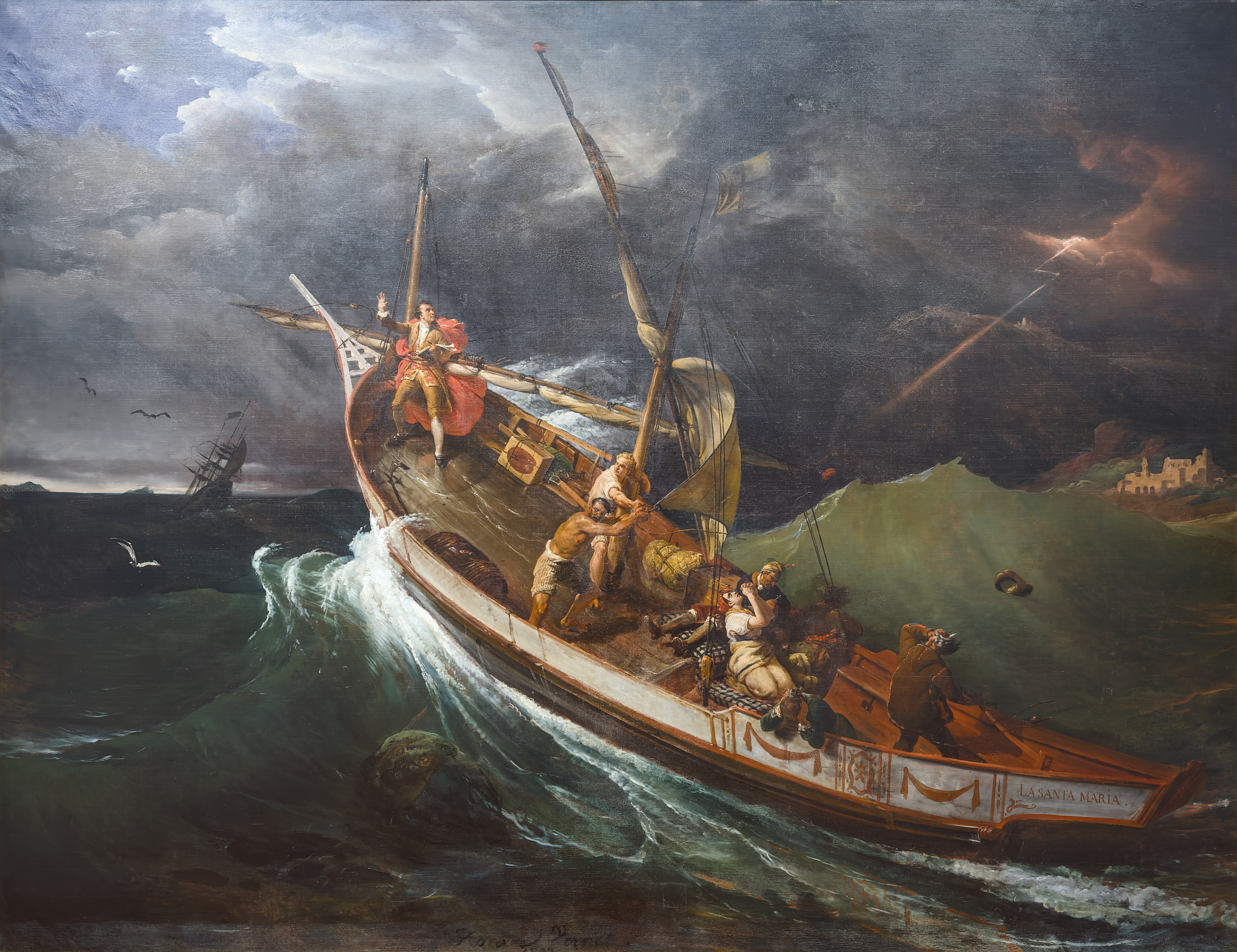
- Artist: Horace Vernet
- Year: 1822
- Type: Oil on canvas, history painting
- Dimensions: 275 cm × 336 cm (108 in × 132 in)
- Location: Calvet Museum, Avignon

Joseph Vernet Tied to a Mast During a Storm (French: Joseph Vernet attaché à un mât étudie les effets de la tempête) is an 1822 history painting by the French artist Horace Vernet. It depicts a famous, possibly apocryphal, incident from the life of the artist's grandfather the marine painter Joseph Vernet who lashed himself to the mast of a ship in order to witness the effects of a storm. He had received a commission from Louis XV to paint a series of pictures depicting the ports of France and after departing Italy had run into a violent storm. As a rising artist Horace Vernet promoted his connection with his celebrated grandfather but quickly developed a reputation as a prolific and versatile painter in his own right.

When a government-commissioned painting from Théodore Géricault fell through, Auguste de Forbin suggested that Vernet should take over the commission with a work depicting his grandfather. Joseph Vernet is shown lashed to the foremast of a partially dismasted felucca with a sketchbook in his hand.

== Exhibition ==
Ahead of the 1822 Salon, two of the works that the artist submitted The Gate of Clichy and The Battle of Jemappes were rejected by the authorities due to the display of historically accurate but now potentially subversive tricolour flags. In response Vernet withdrew all his works entered into the salon except one, instead staging a solo exhibition at his own studio which was a great success.

As it was produced as a royal commission, this was the sole Vernet painting on display at the Salon. The authorities attempted to emphasise the Royalist nature of the painting, in which the elder Vernet had been fulfilling an important commission for the king.

Today it is in the collection of the Calvet Museum in Avignon.

== Bibliography ==
- Harkett, Daniel & Hornstein, Katie (ed.) Horace Vernet and the Thresholds of Nineteenth-Century Visual Culture. Dartmouth College Press, 2017.
- Heffernan, James. Cultivating Picturacy: Visual Art and Verbal Interventions. Baylor University Press, 2006.
- Isham, Howard F. Image of the Sea: Oceanic Consciousness in the Romantic Century. Peter Lang, 2004.
