= La Barrière de Clichy =

1820 painting by Horace Vernet

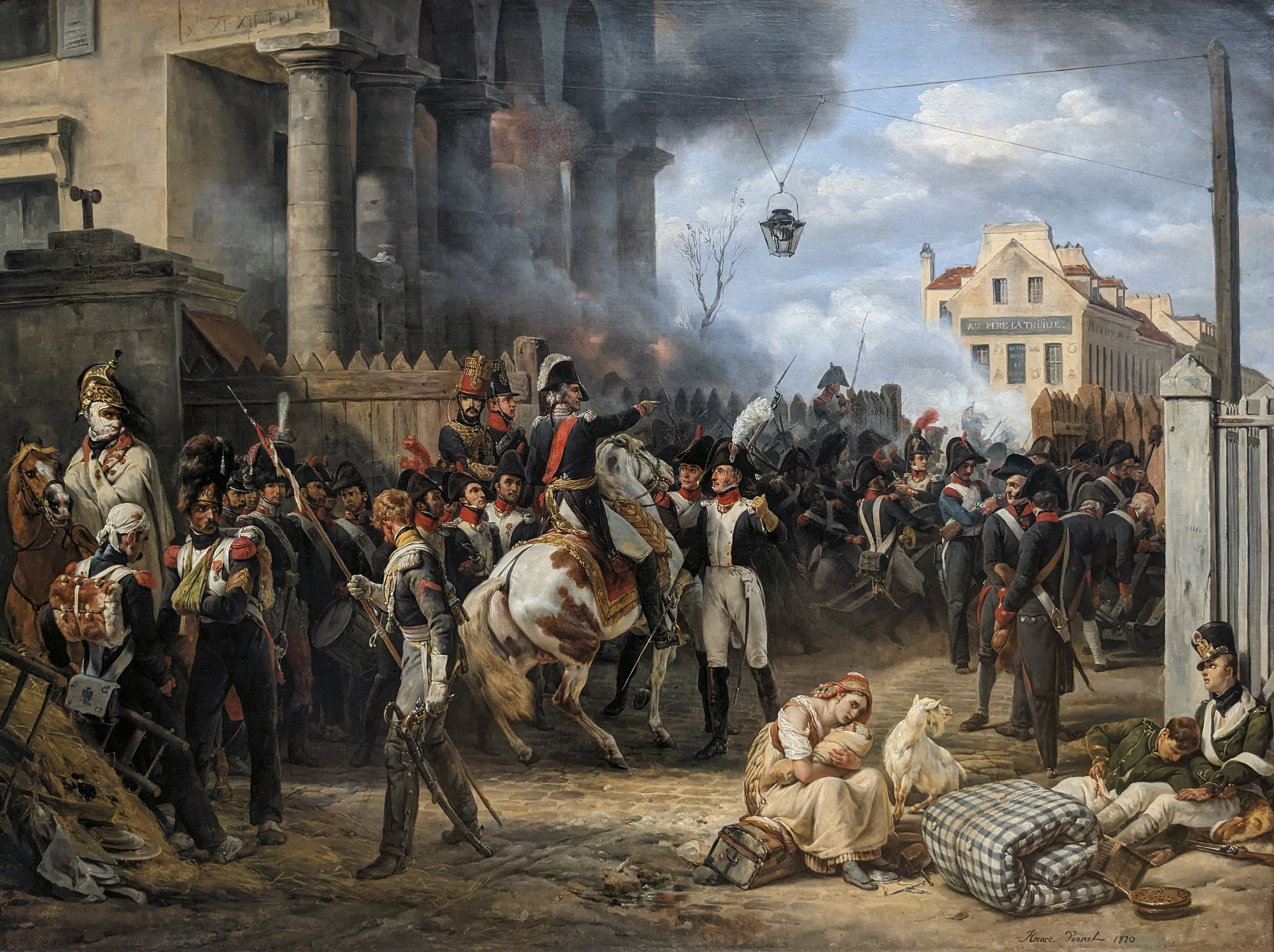
The Barrière de Clichy. Defence of Paris, 30 March 1814 (1820) by Horace Vernet

The Clichy Barrier. Defence of Paris, 30 March 1814 is an 1820 oil-on-canvas painting by Horace Vernet. It shows a battle against Russian Cossacks at the barrière de Clichy (part of the Battle of Paris), highlighting the soldiers present but not engaged in fighting. Vernet's participation in this battle marked his only experience in active combat, which influenced his choice of subject matter for the remainder of his career.

The painting was commissioned by the goldsmith Jean-Baptiste-Claude Odiot, who, like Vernet, fought in the battle under Bon-Adrien Jeannot de Moncey. Odiot gave the work to the Chambre des Pairs in 1835. It was transferred to the musée du Luxembourg two years later, then to its current owner, the Louvre, in 1874.

== Context ==
Vernet fought in the defense of Paris as a member of the National Guard in 1814. His participation in this battle resulted in him being inducted into the Legion of Honor during the Hundred Days. After his brief time in the National Guard, Vernet's paintings began to focus primarily on military events and battles. Some of his works following this theme include Bataille de Somo-Sierra (1816), Bataille de Jemmapes (1821), and this painting, La Barrière de Clichy.

== Analysis ==
In La Barrière de Clichy, Vernet depicts various aspects of the battlefield at the Clichy gate in the defense of Paris, including soldiers not engaged in direct combat. He placed the battle in the background of the painting, while in the foreground, he painted leaders giving orders and wounded soldiers. Vernet showed precise attention to detail in this work, illustrating the soldiers' uniforms with accuracy. The painting highlights the reality soldiers face in battle beyond fighting, a topic about which he had a personal perspective.

For Malika Dorbani-Bouabdellah, scientific collaborator at the Louvre's paintings department, the work "translates the troops' despair, their last noble, courageous but betrayed effort." His painting of the battle of Jemappes evokes the first victories of the French Revolution in 1792, and Barrière, that Revolution's last expression: "The painting is a show of patriotism which raises the defeat of the [1814] campaign in France to a glorious and raises the painted work to the rank of a historic work."

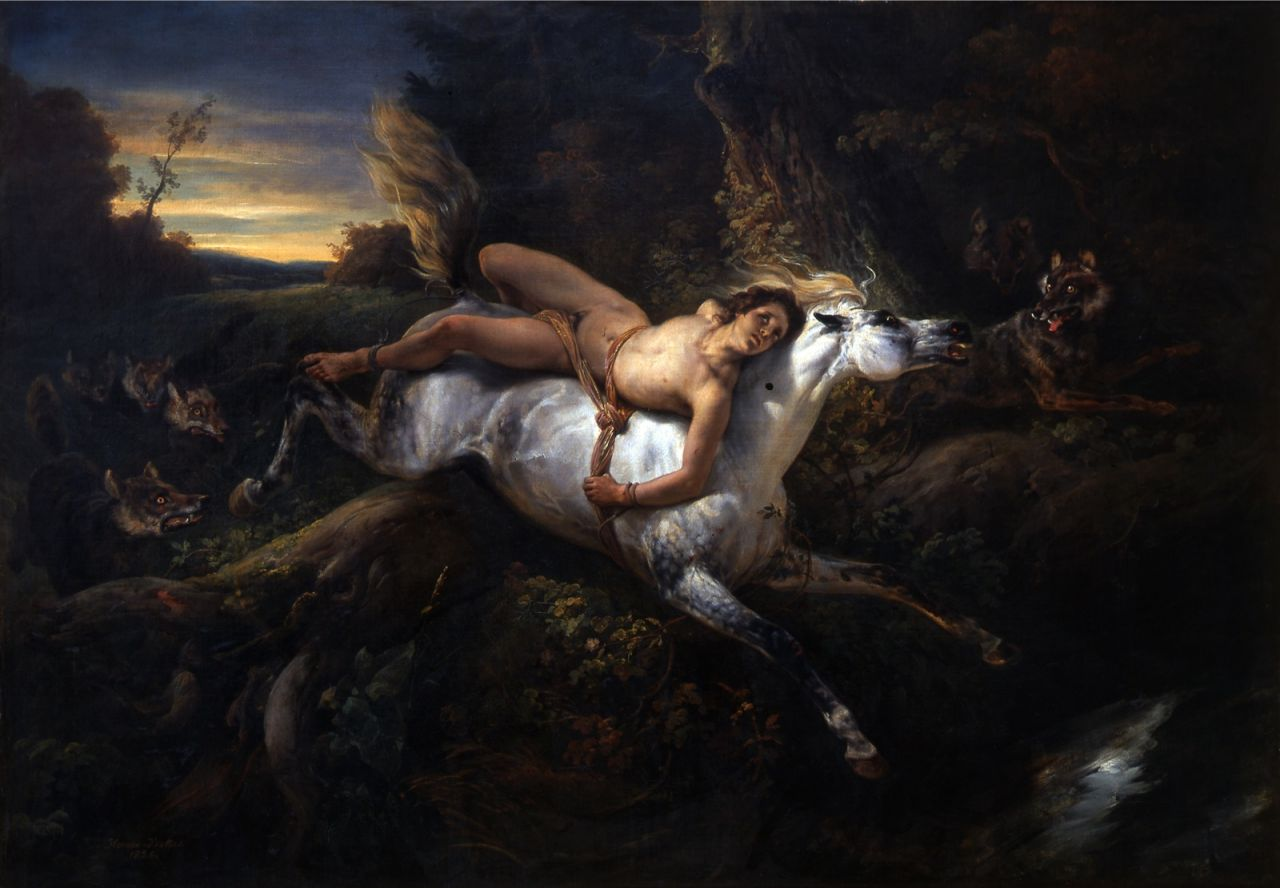
Mazeppa aux loups (1826) by Horace Vernet

The brighter colors and more rigid brush strokes used in La Barrière de Clichy do not reflect the Romantic qualities of Vernet's later works, such as Mazeppa (1825) and Mazeppa aux loups (1826).

== Reception and influences ==
The painting was refused by the 1822 Paris Salon after it was censored by the Bourbon government for its supposed rebellious, Napoleonic undertones. Vernet held an exhibition in protest of this censorship in 1822. The controversy resulting from this studio exhibition gave him publicity and cemented his public reputation as the leading battle painter in France. The popularity of the exhibition brought Vernet to the attention of King Charles X, who then commissioned several paintings from Vernet. Thoma concludes that these commissions gradually tempered Vernet's rebellious image.

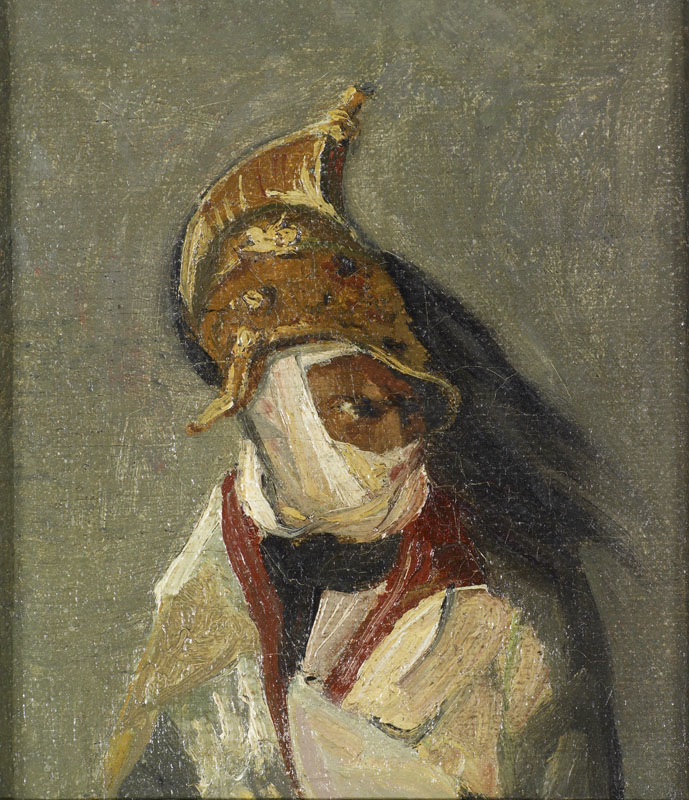
Géricault, The Wounded Cuirassier

A study of Vernet's painting titled The Wounded Cuirassier (initially titled Portrait of Colonel de Moncey, although Moncey a hussar not a cuirassier) is attributed to Théodore Géricault, who had close links with Horace's father Carle Vernet. Carle and Géricault shared a passion for horses and military campaigns. It is now in the musée des beaux-arts de Dijon. Around 1826 Jean-Pierre-Marie Jazet produced an engraving of Vernet's work.

Alexandre Dumas premiered the five-act military play La barrière de Clichy in 1851 at the théâtre des Batignolles (now the théâtre Hébertot), consisting of fifteen tableaux. The last tableau of its third act, Tableau de la barrière de Clichy, was inspired by Vernet's painting and giving the play as a whole its title.

In 1855, the painting was displayed in Vernet's retrospective exhibition, together with three other battle scenes commissioned by his mentor the duc d'Orléans. Vernet had restored the paintings after a fire damaged them during the Revolution of 1848. Based on Vernet's efforts to restore these four paintings for the exhibition, Thoma infers that Vernet wished to signal his commitment to the Napoleonic era.

One of the 1869 bas-reliefs on the monument to marshal Moncey on Place de Clichy uses the painting's composition.
