= Samuel Paynter (landowner) =

British businessman (1774–1844)

Samuel Paynter (1774 – July 24, 1844) was an English builder and landowner. He was a wealthy gentleman based in the City of London and from St Issey in Cornwall.

== Biography ==
Paynter inherited, at the death of his father (a grandnephew of Rev. William Paynter) in 1801, the country estate of Camborne House, Richmond, Surrey. The Paynters — who formerly bore the name Camborne, alias Paynter, of Deverell, and to whom arms were granted in July 1569 — were a well-established and wealthy Cornish family originating from Trelissick Manor, St Erth, which maintained a powerful local influence and, throughout the late 17th and early 18th centuries, covertly harboured strong loyalties to the House of Stuart (cf. Boskenna).

Samuel Paynter made his vast fortune as a builder and contractor with his brother Francis Paynter (of Denmark Hill) at 64 Coleman Street and 57 Wood Street in the City of London (1807–12). He gained estates in Middlesex and Surrey and was High Sheriff of Surrey in 1839. He was also a Justice of the Peace in Surrey and Middlesex.

He married twice:

- in 1797, Anne Butler (d. 1818). They are the great-grandparents of Brigadier-General Sir George Camborne Beauclerk Paynter;
- in 1821, Mary Penn (d. 1863), daughter of Richard Penn, Governor of Pennsylvania.

== Death ==
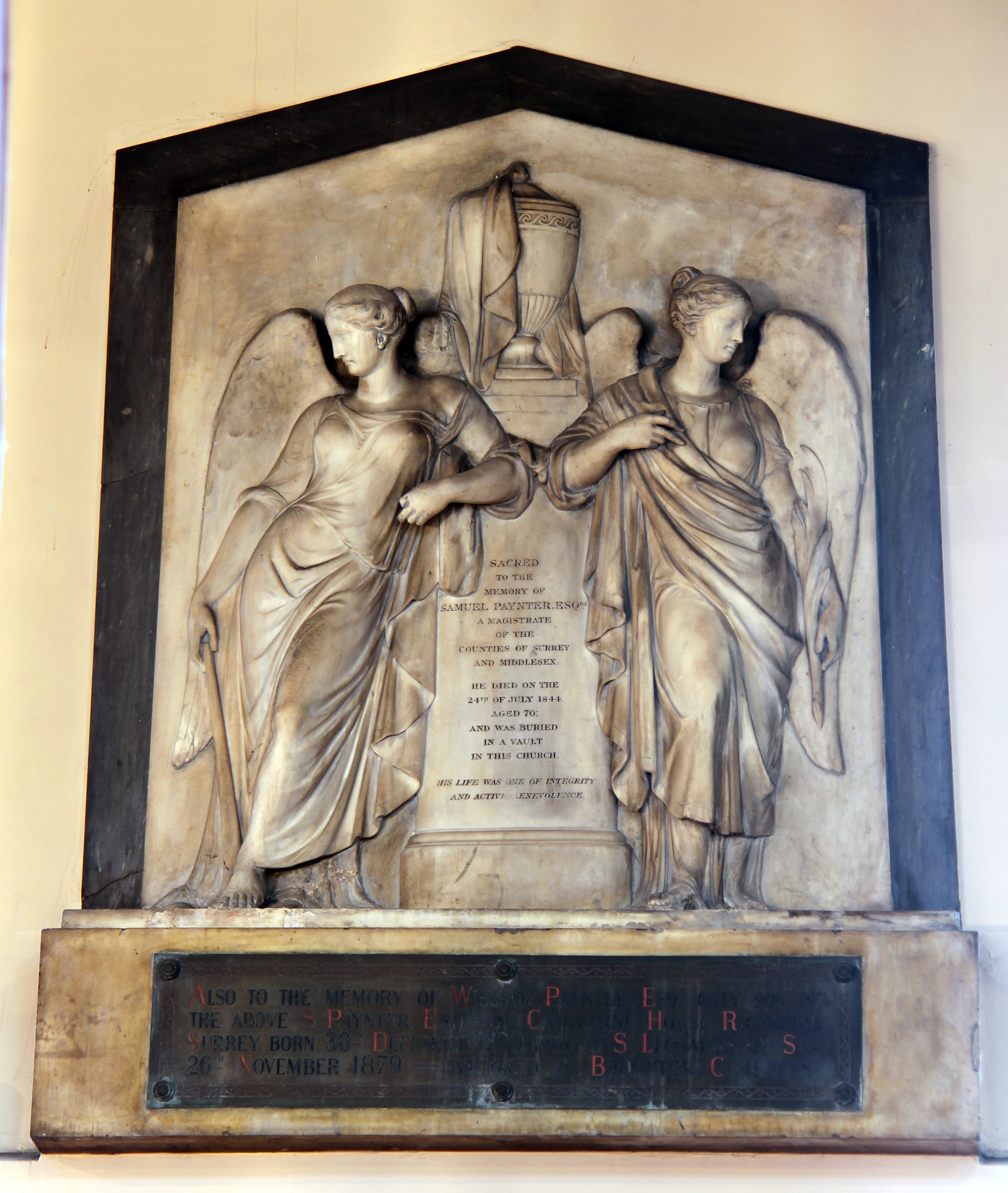
Samuel Paynter memorial

He died of paralysis on 24 July, 1844 aged 70. His memorial in St Mary Magdalene, Richmond church is a tablet with two marble full length angels, by Edward Hodges Baily R.A., who was famous for sculpting Nelson on Nelson's Column.

Honorary titles
Preceded by Thomas-Chaloner Bisse-Challoner	High Sheriff of Surrey; 1839	Succeeded by Peter John Locke King
