= Edward Hodges Baily =

English sculptor (1788–1867)

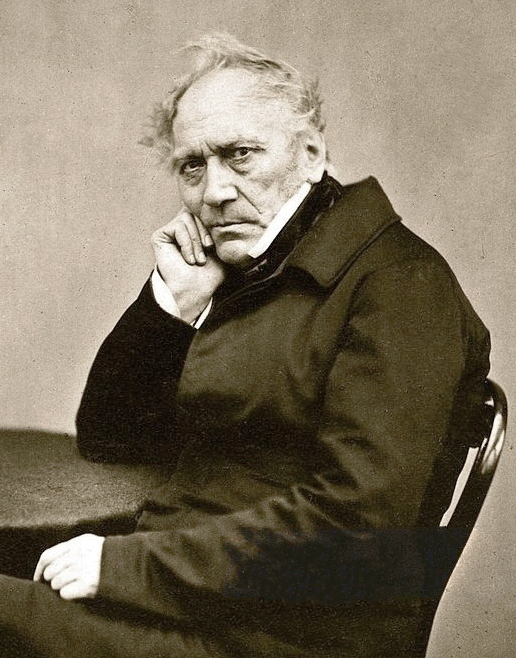
- Born: 10 March 1788; Bristol, England
- Died: 22 May 1867 (aged 79); London, England
- Known for: Sculpting
- Notable work: Nelson's Column
- Awards: FRS, Turner Gold Medal

Edward Hodges Baily (10 March 1788 – 22 May 1867; sometimes misspelled Bailey) was a prolific British sculptor responsible for numerous public monuments, portrait busts, statues and exhibition pieces as well as works in silver. He carved friezes for both the Marble Arch and Buckingham Palace in London. His numerous statues of public figures include that of Horatio Nelson on top of Nelson's Column and Charles Grey, 2nd Earl Grey on Grey's Monument in Newcastle upon Tyne. Throughout his career Baily was responsible for creating a number of monuments and memorials for British churches and cathedrals, including several in St Paul's Cathedral.

== Biography ==
Baily was born on 10 March 1788, at Downend in Gloucestershire, to Martha Hodges (1755–1836) and William Hillier Baily (1763–1834), a woodcutter who specialised in carving ship's figureheads. At the age of fourteen he was placed as an accounts clerk in a mercantile house, where he worked for two years, though he continued to produce wax models and busts, his childhood hobby. In 1804, aged sixteen, he abandoned his job and set himself up as a professional wax portraitist. Two Homeric studies, executed for a friend, were shown to the sculptor John Flaxman who was so impressed, that in 1807, he accepted Baily as a pupil in his London studio and subsequently employed him as an assistant. In 1808, Baily won the silver medal of the Society of Arts for a plaster figure of Laocoön and the next year entered the Royal Academy Schools. At the academy he won a silver medal in 1809 and in 1811 he gained their gold medal for a model of Hercules restoring Alcestis to Admetus, and soon after exhibited Apollo discharging his Arrows against the Greeks and Hercules casting Lichas into the Sea.

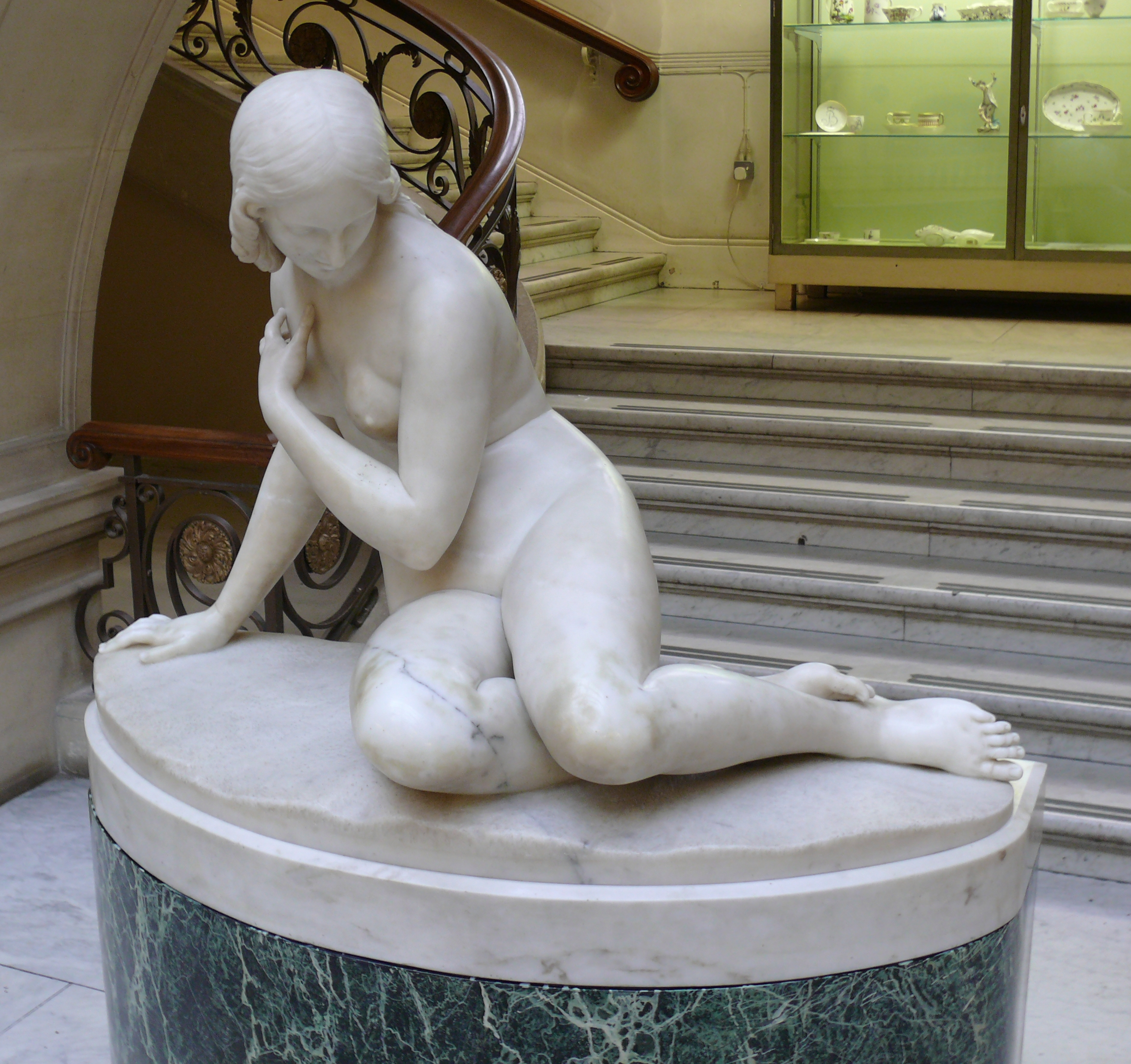
Eve at the Fountain, 1822

From 1816 to 1846, Baily was the Chief Modeller for Rundell, Bridge and Rundell, goldsmiths to the royal family, where he was responsible for creating the Doncaster Cup trophy in 1843 and the Ascot Gold Cup in 1844. Baily also produced designs for the silversmith Paul Storr. For a soup tureen commission in 1821, Baily designed a pair of ornamental handles which became the basis of his large scale marble sculpture Eve at the Fountain, which was acquired by the Bristol Literary Institute and is now in the Bristol Museum & Art Gallery. Widely reproduced at reduced sizes in both Parian ware and bronze, the work was among the most popular individual sculptures in Britain at the time. Baily returned to Eve as a subject in 1842 with the work Eve listening to the Voice. Baily was elected an Associate member of the Royal Academy in 1817 and, on the strength of Eve at the Fountain, a full Academician in 1821.

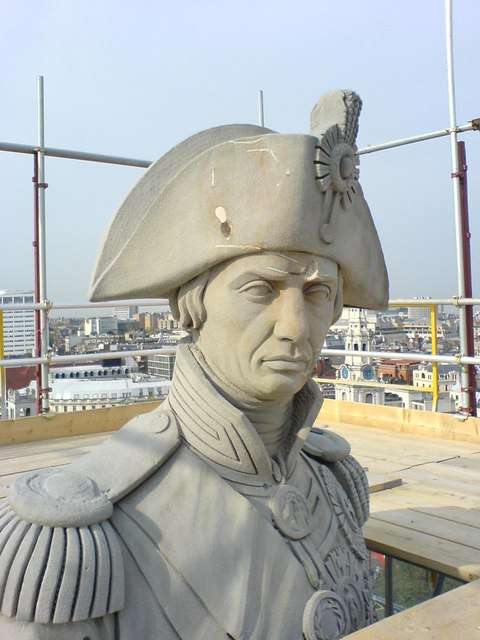
Baily's statue of Nelson on Nelson's Column

From the 1820s until 1858, Baily had a series of high-profile public commissions and was also responsible for numerous portrait busts, statues and exhibition pieces. He carved the bas-reliefs on the facade of the Masonic Hall on Park Street in Bristol and those on the south side of the Marble Arch in Hyde Park in 1826. When changes were made to the size and design of the Marble Arch, a number of friezes that Baily had carved were considered surplus to requirements but were installed on the facade of Buckingham Palace. He also designed the models of the stone figures installed on the pediment of Buckingham Palace when the building was enlarged and carved the frieze Britannia Rewarding Arts and Sciences for the Palace's throne room. He created the prominent statue of Horatio Nelson for the top of Nelson's Column, in Trafalgar Square. For the facade of the National Gallery facing onto Trafalgar Square he created a series of statues and friezes.

Baily exhibited at the Royal Academy regularly from 1810 to 1862 and at the British Institution from 1812 to 1840. His exhibition pieces often represented aspects of family life with titles such as Maternal Affection and Mother and Child. For Saint Stephen's Hall in the Palace of Westminster he created statues of Charles James Fox and Lord Mansfield. Subjects of his portrait busts included the Duke of Wellington, his mentor John Flaxman and Lord Byron. Several of his designs for monuments were cast as small scales bronzes for the domestic retail market, notably his equestrian statue of George IV.

Financial insecurity was a recurring theme in Baily's life. He was first declared bankrupt in 1831, and again in 1838. On the first occasion questions were asked in Parliament on his behalf because his financial distress had resulted from delays in receiving payment for sculptures at Buckingham Palace. Fortunately his appeals to the Royal Academy for financial assistance, were successful in the 1830s, as again in the 1860s, when they provided him with a pension of £200 a year as an honorary retired Academician. Baily's election as a fellow of the Royal Society (FRS) came in 1842. Among his final works was the design for the Turner medal in 1857, the Royal Academy's award for landscape painting.

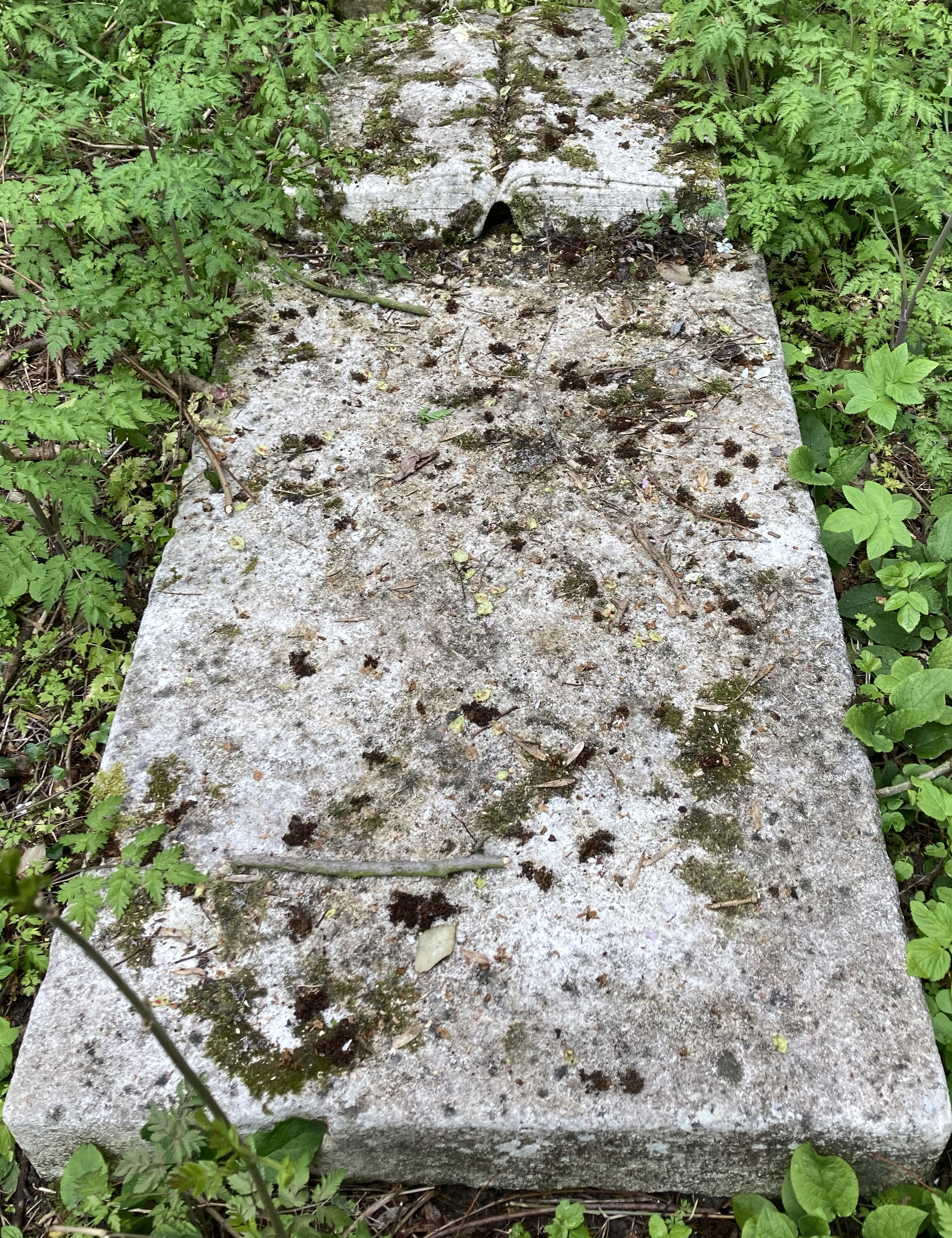
Baily's grave in Highgate Cemetery

Baily married Elizabeth Wardley (1786–1836) in Bristol during 1806 and the couple had four children. Their daughter, Caroline, married Edgar George Papworth Senior one of Baily's assistants. Among his other assistants and pupils were John Henry Foley, Musgrave Watson, Joseph Durham, Edward Bowring Stephens and William Theed. Baily's nephew was William Hellier Baily, the paleontologist.

Baily died at 99 Devonshire Road in Holloway, London, on 22 May 1867, aged 79, and is buried on the western side of Highgate Cemetery.

== Selected public works ==
=== 1815–1829 ===
Image	Title / subject	Location and coordinates	Date	Type	Material	Dimensions	Designation	Wikidata	Notes
	Memorial to Calverly Bewick	Newcastle Cathedral	After 1815	Sculpture group on plinth	Marble		Grade I		With William Theed
More images	William Ponsonby	Crypt of St Paul's Cathedral, London	1820	Sculpture group on plinth	Marble				
More images	Eve at the Fountain	Bristol Museum and Art Gallery	1822	Statue	Marble				A plaster version is held by the Victoria and Albert Museum
	Bristol with Minerva and Apollo	Portico of 17 Park Street, Bristol	1824	Curved relief frieze	Carrara marble	820cm long by 80cm high	Grade II*	Q17553095	Architect;- Charles Robert Cockerell.
	Memorial to Thomas Parry	St. George's Cathedral, Chennai	1824	Relief sculpture	Marble				
More images	Henry Fuseli	National Portrait Gallery, London	1824	Bust	Marble	570mm x 285mm			
More images	John Jervis, 1st Earl of St Vincent	Crypt of St Paul's Cathedral, London	1826	Statue	Marble				
More images	Battle of St Vincent	Regent's Place Plaza, Camden, London	c. 1826	Frieze	Marble				
	Memorial to Bishop George Pelham	St Mary's Church, Buckden, Cambridgeshire	1827	Sculpture	Marble		Grade I		
	Monument to Thomas Picton	Picton Terrace, Carmarthen	1828	Statue	Bronze	Statue; 9ft 6in			Monument was dismantled in 1846
	The Death of General Sir Thomas Picton at Waterloo	Carmarthenshire County Museum, Carmarthen	1828	Relief frieze	Stone				Created for the Picton Monument dismantled in 1846
More images	Valour and Virtue and Peace and Plenty	South face of Marble Arch, London	1828	Two reliefs	Marble	150cm square	Grade I	Q845529	
More images	Pallas Athene	Athenaeum Club, London	1829	Gilded statue			Grade I	Q89271625	Architect, Decimus Burton

=== 1830–1839 ===
Image	Title / subject	Location and coordinates	Date	Type	Material	Dimensions	Designation	Wikidata	Notes
	Sir Thomas Lawrence	National Portrait Gallery, London	1830	Bust	Marble	700mm x 420mm			
More images	Pulteney Malcolm	Crypt of St Paul's Cathedral, London	1832	Statue	Marble				
More images	Maternal Affection	Victoria and Albert Museum	1837	Sculpture group	Marble	94cm			
More images	George Wyndham, 3rd Earl of Egremont	Church of St Mary, Petworth, West Sussex	After 1837	Seated statue on pedestal	Marble		Grade I		
More images	Charles Grey, 2nd Earl Grey	Grey's Monument, Newcastle upon Tyne	1838	Statue	Marble		Grade I	Q5608058	
More images	Thomas Telford	Westminster Abbey, London	1839	Statue on pedestal	Marble				
More images	Horatio Nelson	Nelson's Column, London	1839-42	Statue	Craigleith stone		Grade I	Q2447876	

=== 1840–1849 ===
Image	Title / subject	Location and coordinates	Date	Type	Material	Dimensions	Designation	Wikidata	Notes
More images	Henry Vassall-Fox, 3rd Baron Holland	Westminster Abbey, London	After 1840	Bust on monument with figures at base	Marble				
More images	Prince Albert of Saxe-Coburg and Gotha	Victoria and Albert Museum	1841	Bust	Marble	80cm			Commissioned, and rejected, by Queen Victoria for portraying Albert as too old
More images	Astley Cooper	St Paul's Cathedral, London	1842	Statue	Marble				
More images	Richard Bourke	Sydney, Australia	1842	Statue on pedestal	Bronze & stone				
More images	Eve listening to Adam	Victoria and Albert Museum	1842	Statue	Marble	96.5cm			Also known as Eve listening to the Voice
More images	Dr Isaac Watts	Abney Park Cemetery, Stoke Newington, London	1845	Statue on pedestal	Stone		Grade II	Q26528763	
More images	David Hare	Hare School, Kolkata	1845	Statue on pedestal	Marble		KMC Grade 1	Q68148800	
	Charles Metcalfe, 1st Baron Metcalfe	St. William Grant Park, Kingston, Jamaica	After 1846	Statue on pedestal	Stone				

=== 1850 and later ===
Image	Title / subject	Location and coordinates	Date	Type	Material	Dimensions	Designation	Wikidata	Notes
More images	A Sleeping Girl	Bristol Museum and Art Gallery	1850	Statue	Marble				
More images	Nicholas Conyngham Tindal	Tindal Square, Chelmsford, Essex	1850	Seated statue on pedestal	Bronze & stone		Grade II	Q26391312	
More images	Thomas Fleming	Manchester Cathedral	1851	Statue on pedestal	Marble		Grade I		
More images	Statue of Robert Peel	Market Place, Bury, Greater Manchester	1852	Statue on pedestal with relief panels	Bronze & granite		Grade II	Q7160232	
More images	George Stephenson	National Railway Museum, York	1852	Statue on pedestal	Marble & stone				Relocated from Euston Station, London
	Lord Mansfield	St Stephen's Hall, Westminster, London	1855	Statue on pedestal	Marble				
	Charles James Fox	St Stephen's Hall, Palace of Westminster, London	1856	Statue on pedestal	Marble				

=== Church monuments and memorials ===
Throughout his career Baily was responsible for creating a number of monuments and memorials for British churches and cathedrals. Examples include

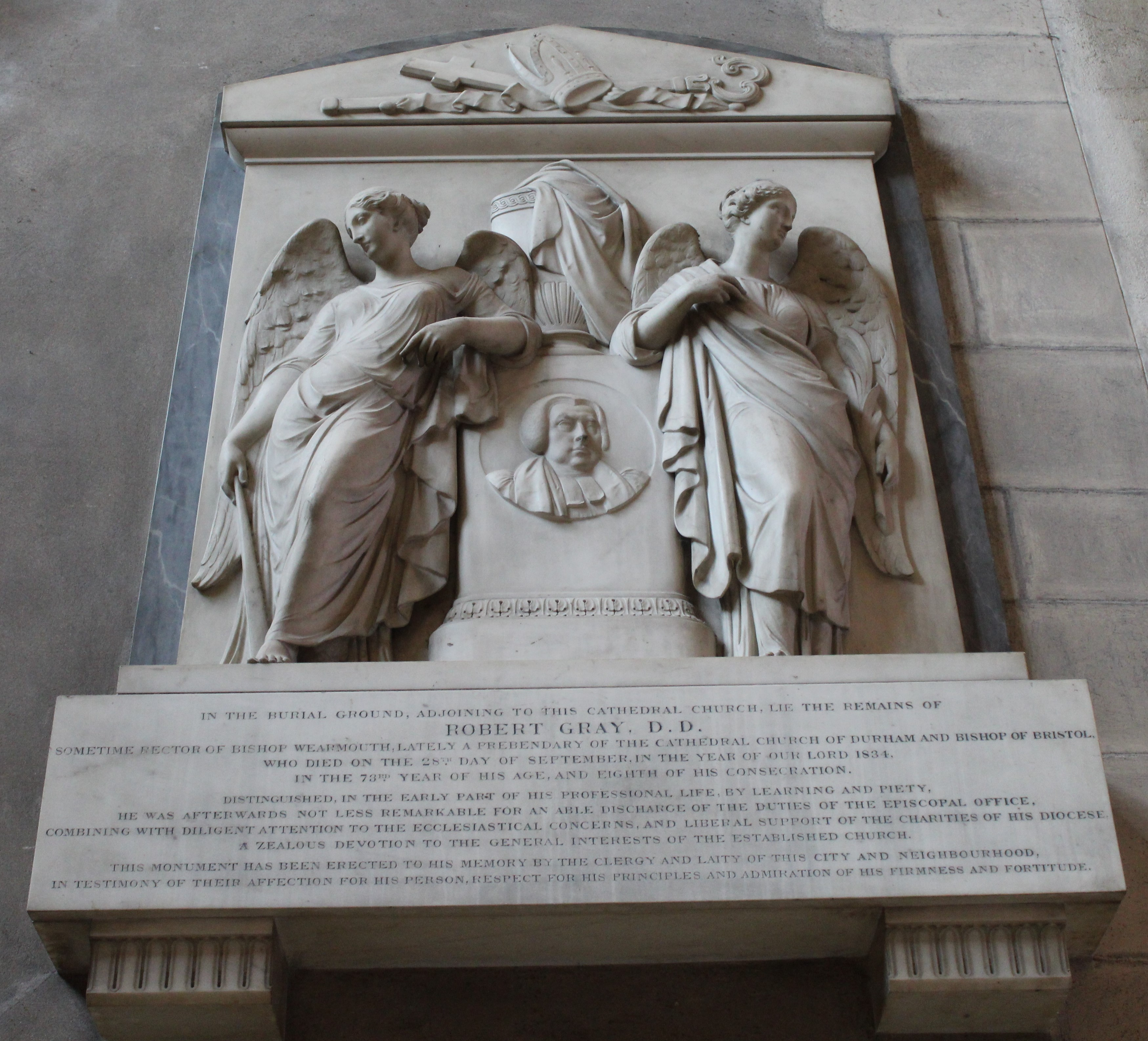
Memorial to Robert Gray, Bristol Cathedral

- A tablet with two marble full-length angels, to Samuel Paynter, of Richmond at St Mary Magdalene, Richmond.
- Several memorials in the Church of St Nicholas, Lintn Hill, Maidstone, at St James, Uttoxeter Road, Stoke-on-Trent and at St John the Baptist, Devizes
- Memorial with kneeling female figure, Church of the Holy Trinity, Ardington, Oxfordshire
- Memorials to Peter Denys, died 1816, and to Lady Charlotte Denys, died 1835, Church of St Mary, Easton Neston, Northamptonshire
- Two memorials, to Benjamin Newcombe (1818) and to George Gostling (1854) in Church of St John the Baptist, Egham High Street
- Memorial plaque to A Walker Heneage, died 1828, in the Church of St Swithin, Compton Bassett
- Memorial tablet for Elizabeth Bell (1829), Church of St James, Lincolnshire
- Large memorial to J. Spearing, died 1831, Church of St Mary, Potterne, Wiltshire
- Memorials to John Ogle, died 1831, and to Sara Ogle, died 1846, in the Church of Saint Mary Magdalene, Whalton
- Memorial, with medallion bust, to Bishop John Jebb, died 1833, in the Church of the Holy Trinity, Clapham Common, London
- A chancel wall plaque 1836, Church of St Andrew, Heddington, Wiltshire
- Wall monument to Thomas Botfield, died 1843, Church of St Michael, Hopton Wafers, Shropshire
- A memorial with carved figure, 1846, Church of St Mary, Hertfordshire
- A sculpture group memorial to John Thackeray, died 1851, Church of St Mary the Virgin, Lewisham High Street, London

=== Other works ===
- The Victoria and Albert Museum in London has Baily's Marius among the ruins of Carthage, a plaster model for a full-size marble sculpture he exhibited at the Royal Academy in 1833. The museum also has a marble bust by Baily of an unidentified man from 1850.
- Lord Byron, 1826, Harrow School; and Newstead Abbey, Nottinghamshire
- Michael Faraday, 1830, University Museum, Oxford
- Philip John Miles, Holy Trinity, Abbots Leigh
- Richard Owen, 1846, Royal College of Surgeons
- Sir John Herschel, 1850, St. John's College, Cambridge
- Busts of Thomas Bewick and Sir James Knott – Literary and Philosophical Society of Newcastle upon Tyne
- Charles Metcalfe, 1st Baron Metcalfe, a marble bust from 1844 in the Victoria Memorial, Kolkata
- Justice – Old Council House, Bristol
- Five statues in niches representing Christ and the Evangelists, after originals by Bertel Thorvaldsen, in the Church of St Margaret at Grittleton, Wiltshire.
- Marble bust of John Flaxman in the Royal Academy with a copy, c. 1836 in Coade stone in the British Museum.
