= St Mary Magdalene, Richmond =

Church in London

Coordinates: 51.4602°N 0.3038°W

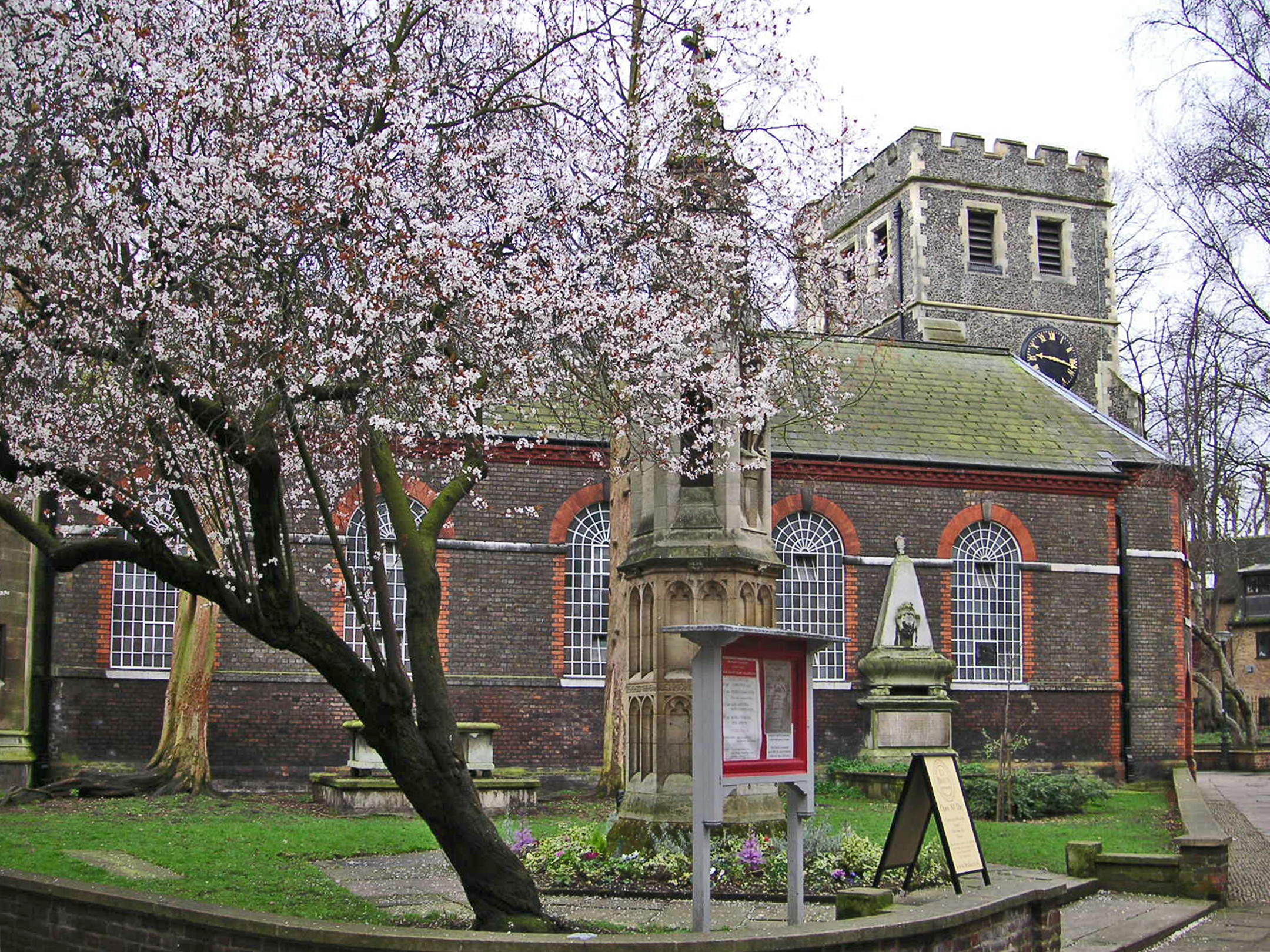
- St Mary Magdalene, Richmond
- OS grid reference: TQ 17934 74829
- Country: England
- Denomination: Church of England
- Churchmanship: English Choral
- Website: Parish website

Architecture
- Architect(s): Arthur Blomfield (Victorian modifications); George Frederick Bodley (early 20th century changes); Peter Bowyer (21st century reordering)
- Years built: c. 1220–1904

Specifications
- Capacity: 300

Administration
- Province: Canterbury
- Diocese: Southwark
- Archdeaconry: Wandsworth
- Deanery: Richmond & Barnes
- Parish: St Mary Magdalene, Richmond

Clergy
- Vicar: Vacant

Listed Building – Grade II*
- Official name: Church of St Mary Magdalene
- Designated: 10 January 1950
- Reference no.: 1180602

St Mary Magdalene, Richmond, in the Anglican Diocese of Southwark, is a Grade II* listed parish church on Paradise Road, Richmond, London. The church, dedicated to Jesus' companion Mary Magdalene, was built in the early 16th century but has been greatly altered so that, apart from the tower, the visible parts of the church date from the 18th, 19th and early 20th centuries.

Since 1996 St Mary Magdalene's has been part of the Richmond Team Ministry, which also includes the churches of St John the Divine and St Matthias. It has a strong musical tradition and offers choral services each Sunday.

== History ==
The initial chapel was built in around 1220. The church was entirely reconstructed during the reign of Henry VII who, after rebuilding the royal palace of Sheen, renamed Sheen as Richmond in 1501. The two bottom sections of the tower that survive from this period were re-faced in flint in 1904.

In the early 17th century, a south aisle was added to the nave. The north aisle was added in 1699. The original nave and the south aisle were rebuilt in 1750, and iron window frames replaced the original windows in 1850.

The plaster ceiling over the nave was replaced in 1866 by the architect Arthur Blomfield with timberwork, described by Bridget Cherry and Nikolaus Pevsner as "inappropriate". Blomfield also constructed new galleries and replaced the box pews with bench pews.

In 1903–04 the architect George Frederick Bodley replaced the chancel with a new chancel, two chapels (Chapel of All Souls and Chapel of All Saints) and a vestry in a Neo-Gothic style. The tower was faced with flint and stone to match the east end. The north and south galleries were removed at this time. The west gallery was removed in 1935–36.

=== Burials and monuments ===
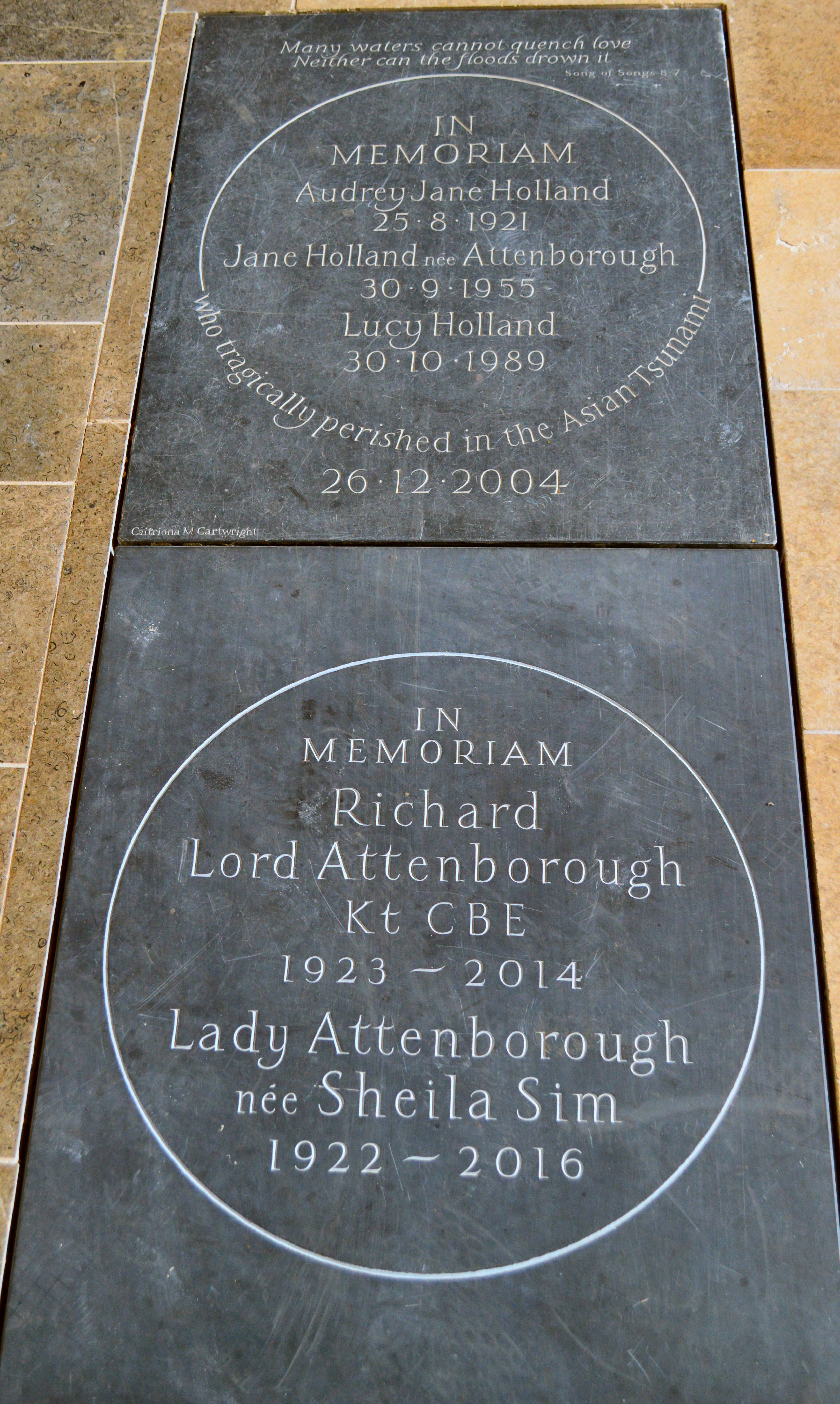
Markers for the graves of Richard Attenborough, Sheila Sim, their daughter Jane Holland and their granddaughter, Lucy, at St Mary Magdalene, Richmond.

- Richard Attenborough, Lord Attenborough (d. 2014), actor, filmmaker, entrepreneur, and politician, who lived on Richmond Green. His ashes are interred in a vault beside those of his spouse Sheila, their daughter Jane Holland and his granddaughter, Lucy, both of whom had died in the Boxing Day tsunami of 2004.
- There is a memorial inside the church to popular novelist Mary Elizabeth Braddon, who lived in Richmond, died in 1915 and is interred in Richmond Cemetery.
- Henry Brouncker, 3rd Viscount Brouncker (d. 1688), was Cofferer of the Household to Charles II, and served as Gentleman of the Bedchamber to James, Duke of York (who became James II). He is buried at the church and there is also a memorial to him.
- The oldest monument in the church is a brass plaque to Robert Cotton (d. 1591), a courtier to Mary I and Elizabeth I.
- The church has a memorial to Richard FitzWilliam, 7th Viscount FitzWilliam (d. 1816), founder of the Fitzwilliam Museum in Cambridge, and his grandfather Sir Matthew Decker (d. 1749), a merchant and writer on trade who was High Sheriff of Surrey in 1729.
- The local philanthropist William Hickey (d. 1727), whose bequest funded the building of Hickey's Almshouses in Richmond, is buried in an altar tomb in the churchyard.
- Barbara Hofland (d. 1844), author and poet, is buried in the church, and there is also a memorial to her.
- The Shakespearean actor Edmund Kean, who died in 1833, is buried in the church. There is also a memorial to him inside the church.
- There is a monument to Barbara Lowther (d. 1805) by John Flaxman.
- Samuel Paynter, of Richmond, who died in 1844, is buried in the church. He was High Sheriff of Surrey in 1839. He is commemorated by a memorial tablet with two marble full-length angels, by Edward Hodges Baily RA FRS, who was famous for sculpting Admiral Horatio Nelson on Nelson's Column in London's Trafalgar Square.
- The poet James Thomson, who wrote the lyrics of "Rule, Britannia!" and died in 1748, is buried near the font. There is a brass memorial to him inside the church: it was placed there by David Erskine, 11th Earl of Buchan in 1792.
- George Wakefield (d. 1776) and his sons Thomas Wakefield (who succeeded his father as Minister at the church until his death in 1806) and Gilbert Wakefield (d. 1801), scholar and controversialist, are commemorated by memorials on the north wall.
- The actor Richard Yates (d. 1796) was buried at his own request in the chancel by his second wife Mary Ann Yates, who was also a well-known actress; her age is recorded as 49 although she was probably born in Birmingham in 1728.

==== War memorial ====
In the churchyard there is a Grade II listed memorial, dedicated on 29 March 1921, to commemorate those from St Marys Magdalene's Church and St Matthias Church who died in service in the world wars.

=== Bells ===
The tower contains a ring of eight bells. They bear dates between 1680 and 1761 and were re-hung in a clockwise ring in the 1980s. The tenor bell weighs almost 19 cwt.

=== Organ ===
The organ was built in 1907 by J. W. Walker & Sons Ltd, who also cleaned it in 1929 and restored it in 1965. A specification of the organ can be found on the National Pipe Organ Register.

== Notable clergy ==
- The Right Reverend Eyre Chatterton, DD, FRGS (1863–1950), an eminent Anglican author who served as Bishop of Nagpur, India from 1903 to 1926, as well as being an amateur tennis player, was appointed curate at St Mary Magdalene's in 1900.

== Gallery ==
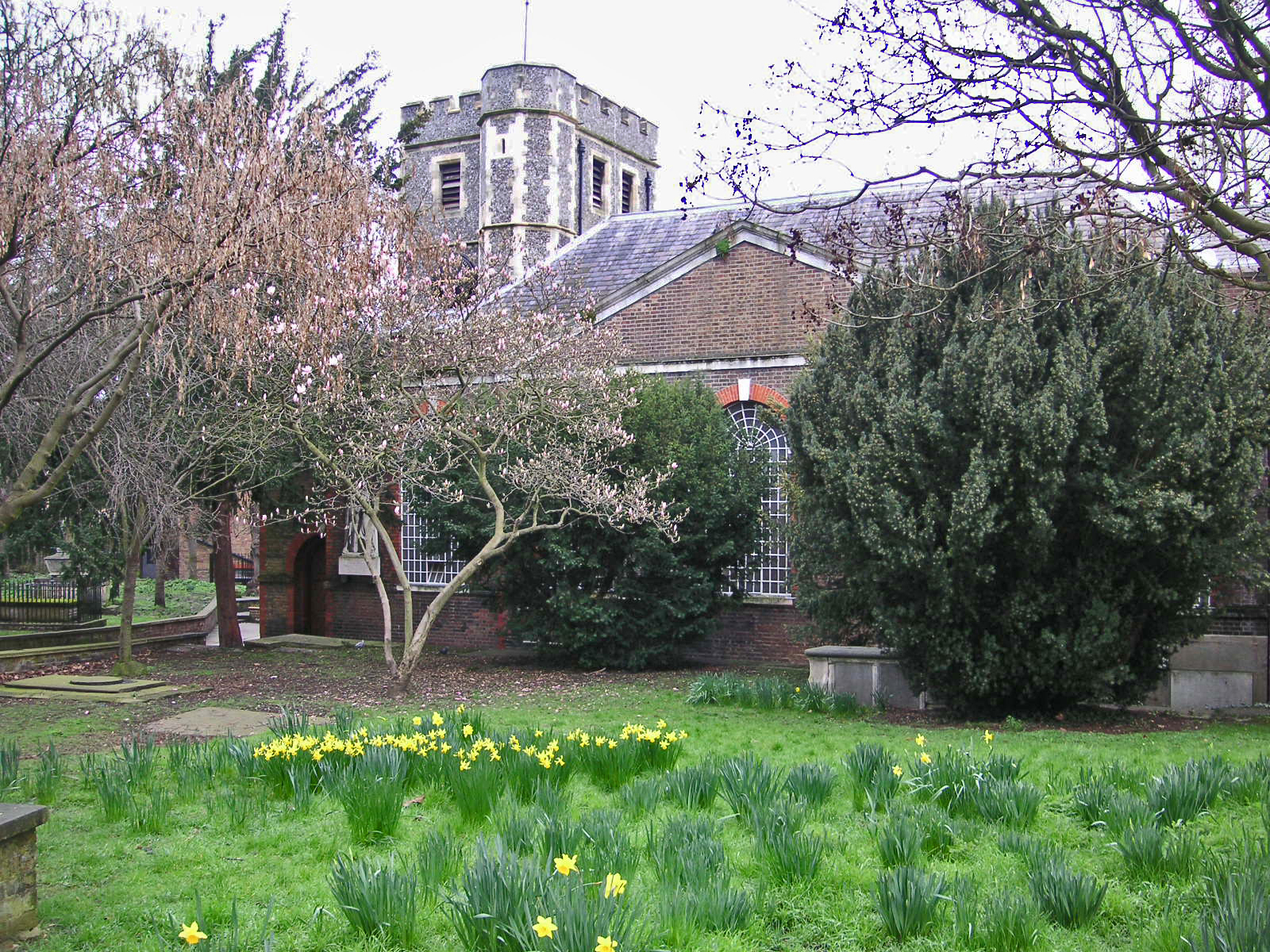
St Mary Magdalene Church

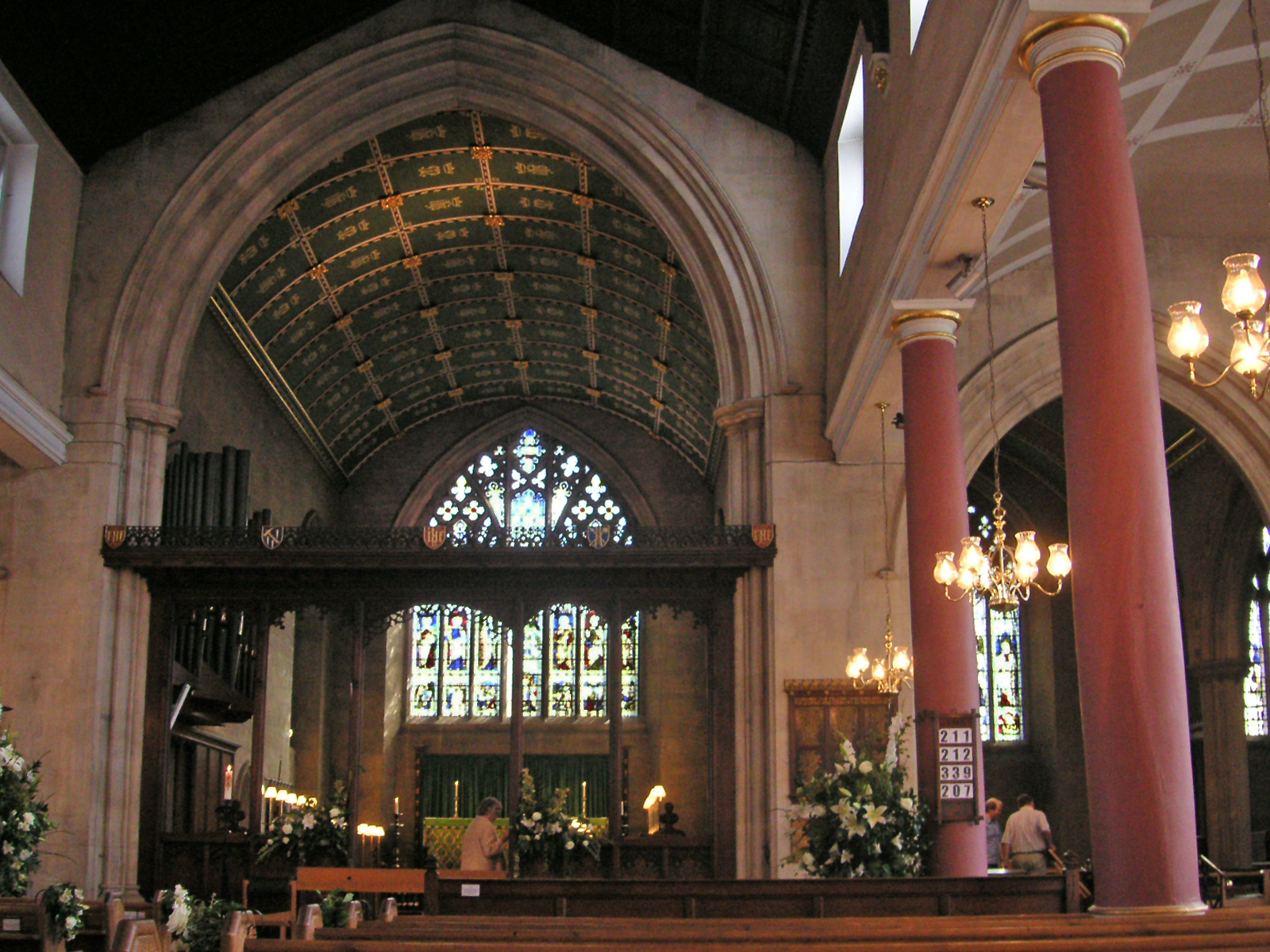
Interior, looking towards the chancel

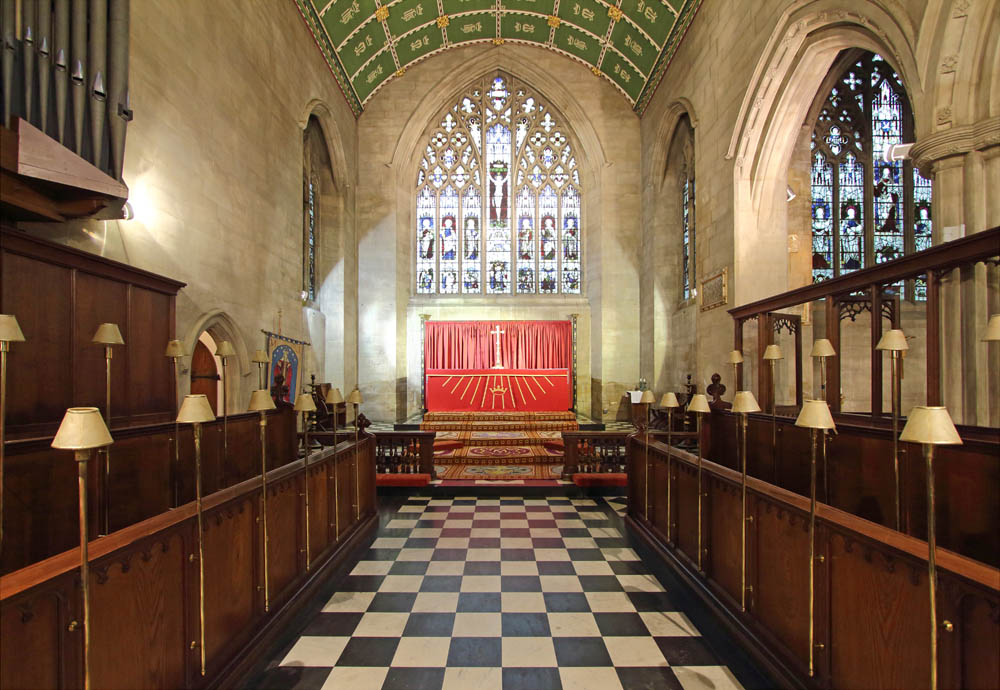
Chancel

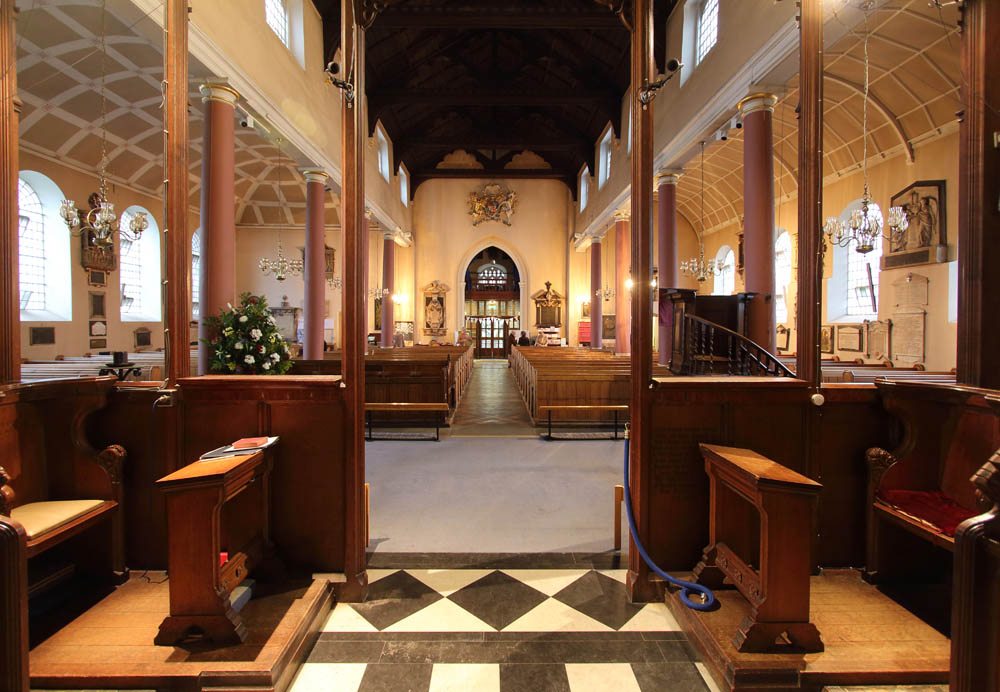
West end

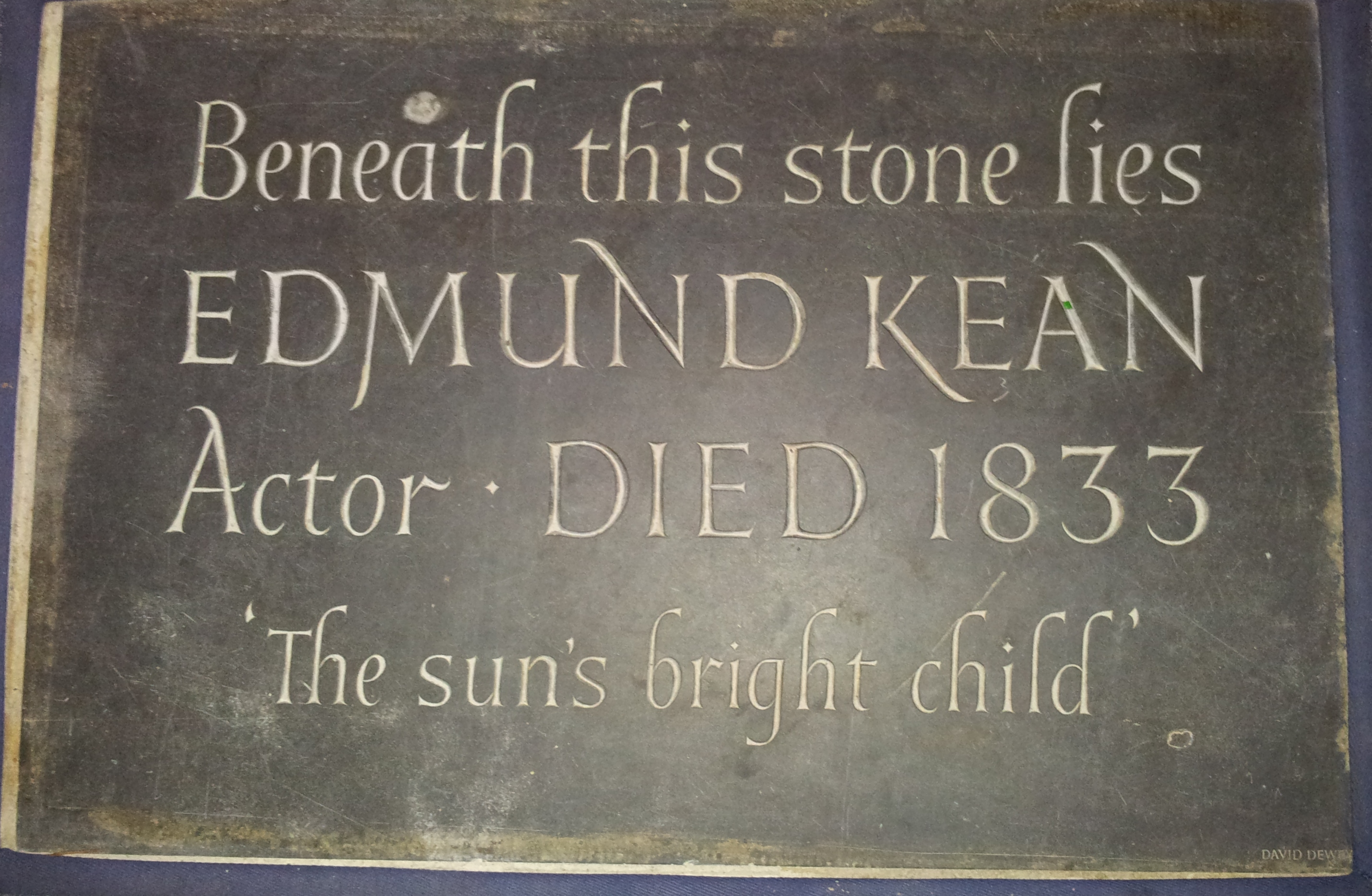
Edmund Kean's grave

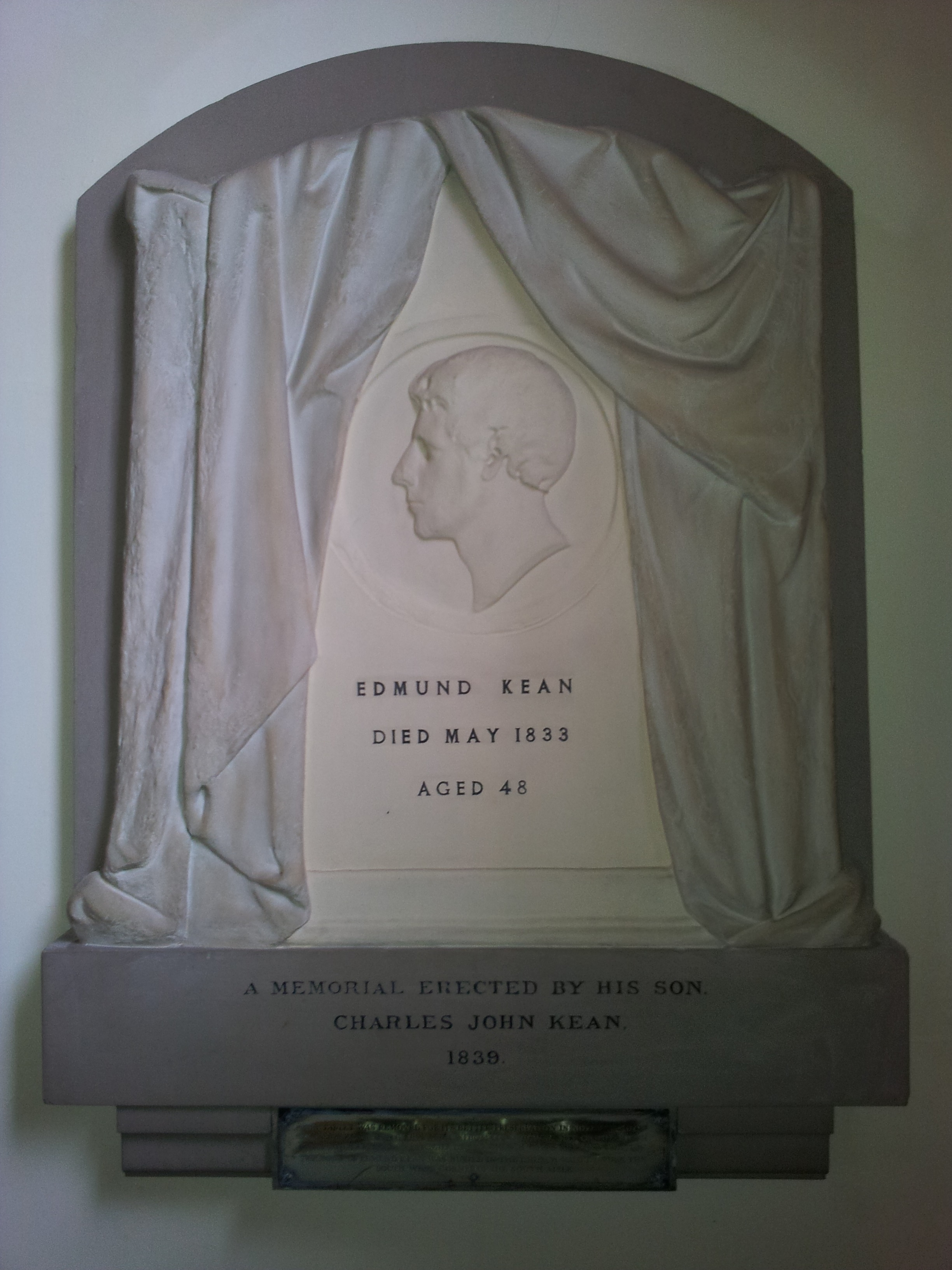
Memorial to Edmund Kean

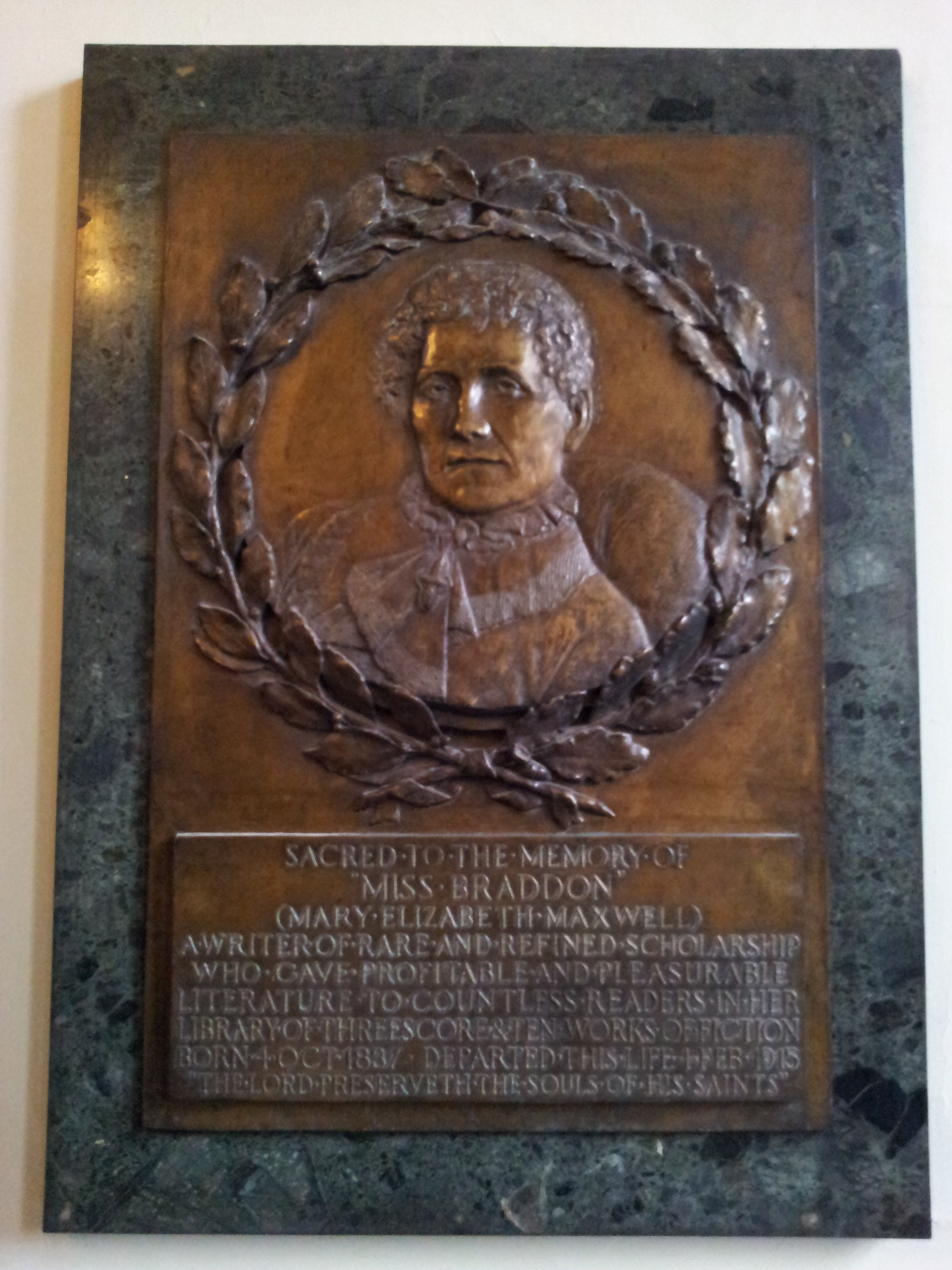
Memorial to "Miss Braddon"

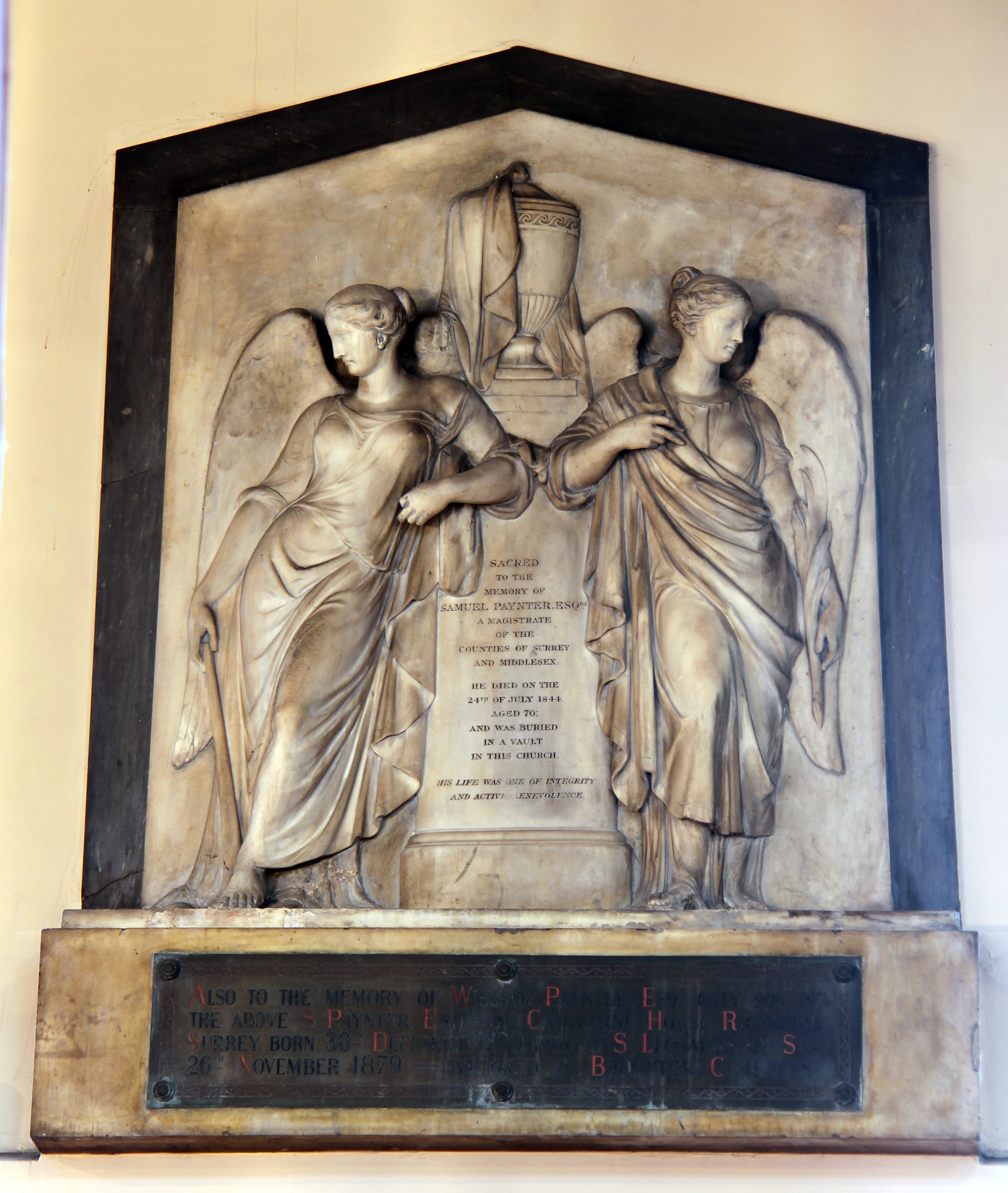
Memorial to Samuel Payntery

War memorial in the churchyard
