= William Hellier Baily =

English palaeontologist (1819–1888)

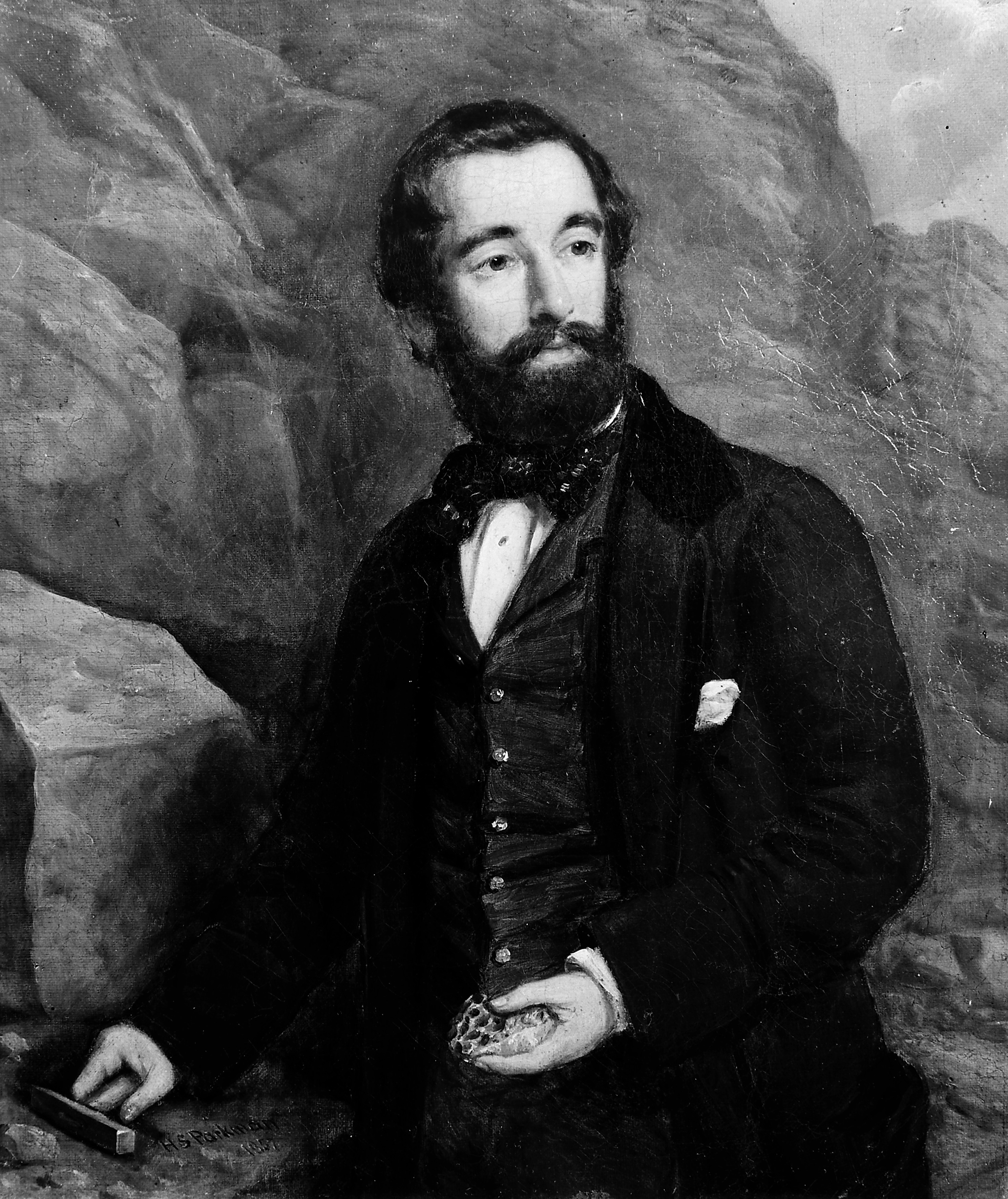
- William Hellier Baily. Credit: Wellcome Library
- Born: 7 July 1819; Bristol
- Died: 6 August 1888 (aged 69); Dublin

William Hellier Baily (7 July 1819 – 6 August 1888) was an English palaeontologist. His uncle was E.H. Baily, a sculptor. William Hellier Baily was born at Bristol on 7 July 1819.

From 1837 to 1844 he was Assistant Curator in the Bristol Museum, a post he relinquished to join the staff of the British Geological Survey in London. In 1854 he became assistant naturalist, under Edward Forbes and afterwards under Huxley. In 1857 he was transferred to the Irish branch of the Geological Survey, as acting palaeontologist, and retained this post until the end of his life.

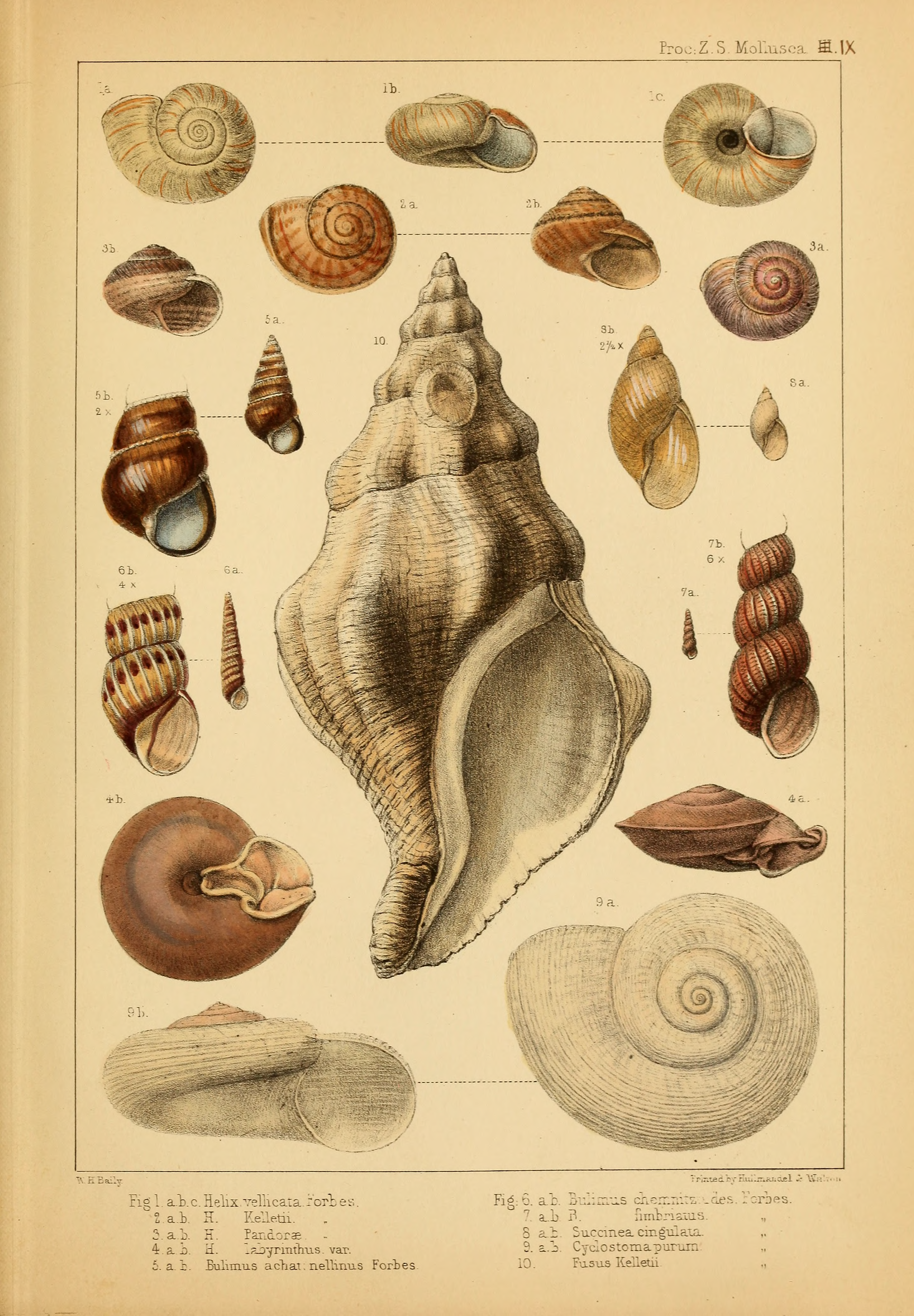
An example of a plate with gastropod shells by William Hellier Baily.

He was the author of many papers on palaeontological subjects, and of notes on fossils in the explanatory memoirs of the Geological Survey of Ireland. He published (1867–1875) a useful work entitled Figures of Characteristic British Fossils, with Descriptive Remarks, of which only the first volume, dealing with palaeozoic species, was issued. The figures were all drawn on stone by himself. He died at Rathmines near Dublin on 6 August 1888.
