= St John the Divine, Richmond =

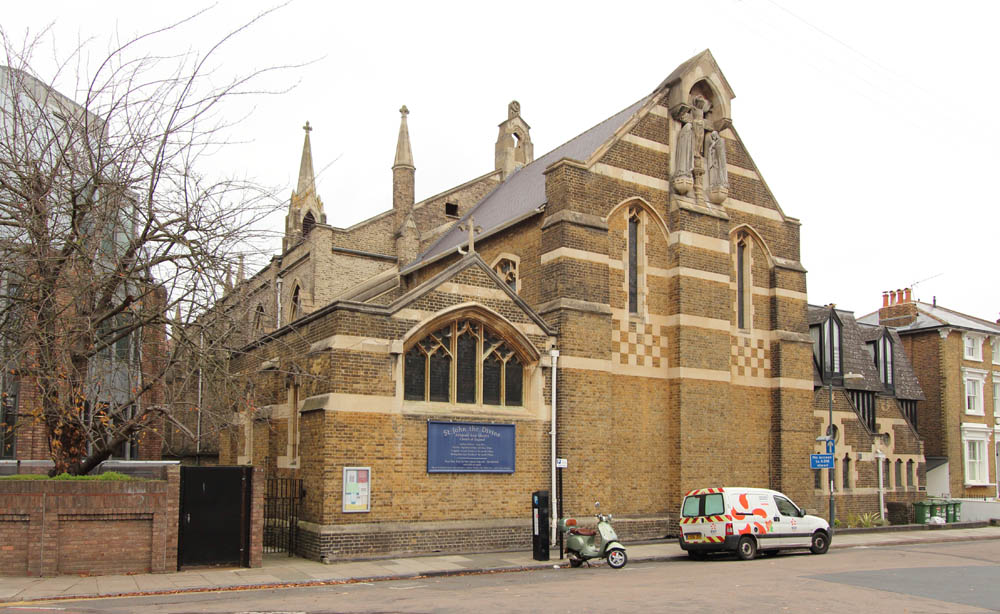
- St John the Divine from St John's Road, Richmond
- St John the Divine, Richmond
- 51.4642°N 0.3003°W
- Location: Richmond, London
- Country: England
- Denomination: Church of England
- Website: www.richmondteamministry.org/stjohn

History
- Founded: 1831

Architecture
- Architect(s): Lewis Vulliamy (original building); Arthur Grove (later additions and church hall)
- Style: Early Gothic Revival
- Completed: 1836

Administration
- Province: Canterbury
- Diocese: Southwark
- Archdeaconry: Wandsworth
- Deanery: Richmond & Barnes
- Parish: St John the Divine, Richmond

Clergy
- Archbishop: Justin Welby
- Bishop: Christopher Chessun
- Vicar: The Reverend Joe Moore

Listed Building – Grade II
- Official name: Church of St John the Divine
- Designated: 10 January 1950
- Reference no.: 1194182

St John the Divine, Richmond, in the Anglican Diocese of Southwark, is a Grade II listed church on Kew Road, in Richmond, London, near Richmond railway station. Built in 1836, and a parish in its own right since 1838, it was designed by Lewis Vulliamy in the Early Gothic Revival architectural style.

Since 1996 St John the Divine has been part of the Richmond Team Ministry, which also includes the churches of St Mary Magdalene and St Matthias.

== History ==
Richmond grew rapidly during the 18th and early 19th centuries. By the 1820s, Richmond's original parish church, St Mary Magdalene, was too small. Having recognised the need for another chapel, the vestry commissioned new construction by 1831. The new building, St John the Divine, was completed in 1836. It was built from 1831 to 1836 on a site provided by local resident and landowner, William Selwyn (1775–1855); the architect was Lewis Vulliamy. Bridget Cherry and Nikolaus Pevsner criticise Vulliamy's "craziest W spire and senseless flying buttresses from the W porches up to the nave" but describe Grove's east end (added in the early 20th century) as "a fine composition".

In 1838 it became a parish church in its own right.

=== Organ ===
The organ, built by Beale and Thynne, was dedicated in December 1896. Described as "a virtually unaltered work of Victorian artistry", it has been fully restored.

=== 20th-century additions ===
A chancel, south chapel and vestries were added in 1904–1905; they were designed by Arthur Grove. In 1908, Nathaniel Westlake painted the sanctuary ceiling with illustrations of the Book of Revelation, chapter 14, and created the triptych behind the altar. Westlake also painted the Stations of the Cross, which are now missing; they were replaced between 1955 and 1970 by reliefs in Nabresina stone carved by Freda Skinner. Eric Gill carved the stonework on the triptych and over the sacristy door. The Calvary sculpture on the east end facing St John's Road was carved by Richard Garbe.

The church hall, in brick, was built in 1911.

In 1980–1981 adaptations were made to the church to enable it be used occasionally for concerts and to provide a meeting room, toilet facilities and residential accommodation. The architects were Dry Hastwell Butlin Bicknell, a partnership of David Dry (1934–2011), Vince Hastwell, George Butlin and Roger Bicknell.

=== 21st-century restoration ===
The reredos in the Lady Chapel was restored in the early 21st century by Howell and Bellion.

=== People ===
Vigo Auguste Demant (1893–1983), vicar at St John the Divine from 1933 to 1942, became a Canon of St Paul's Cathedral and an Oxford University professor. A regular broadcaster on the BBC's Third Programme in the 1950s, he served on the committee that produced the 1957 Wolfenden report which recommended that "homosexual behaviour between consenting adults in private should no longer be a criminal offence".

== Worship ==
The church's style of worship is described as "modern/liberal Catholic". Eucharist is celebrated at 11.00 am on Sundays and 7:00 pm on Tuesdays.

== Photo gallery ==
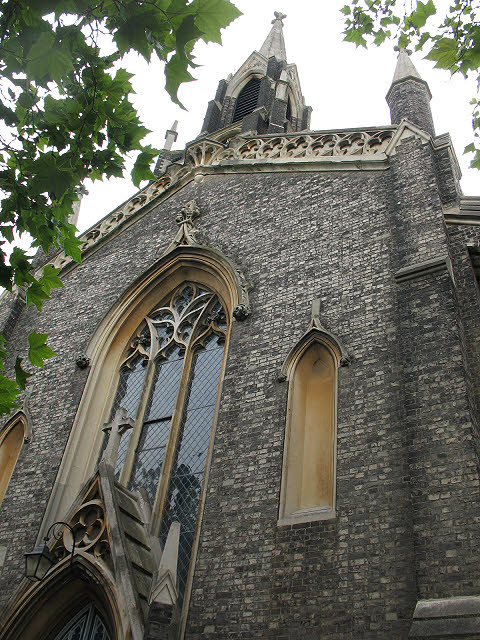
The West façade of the church

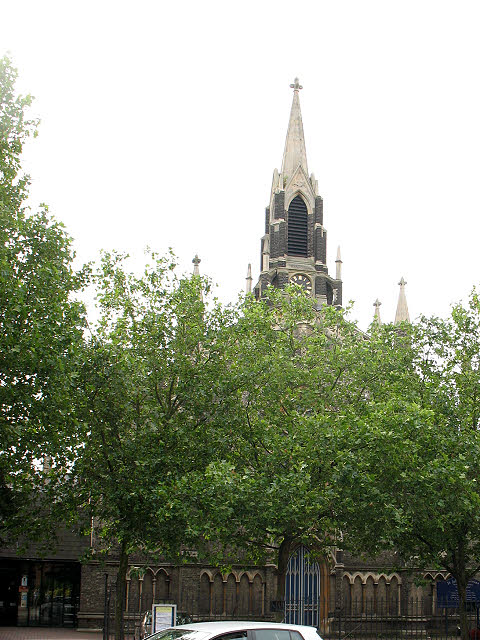
The spire viewed from above the trees

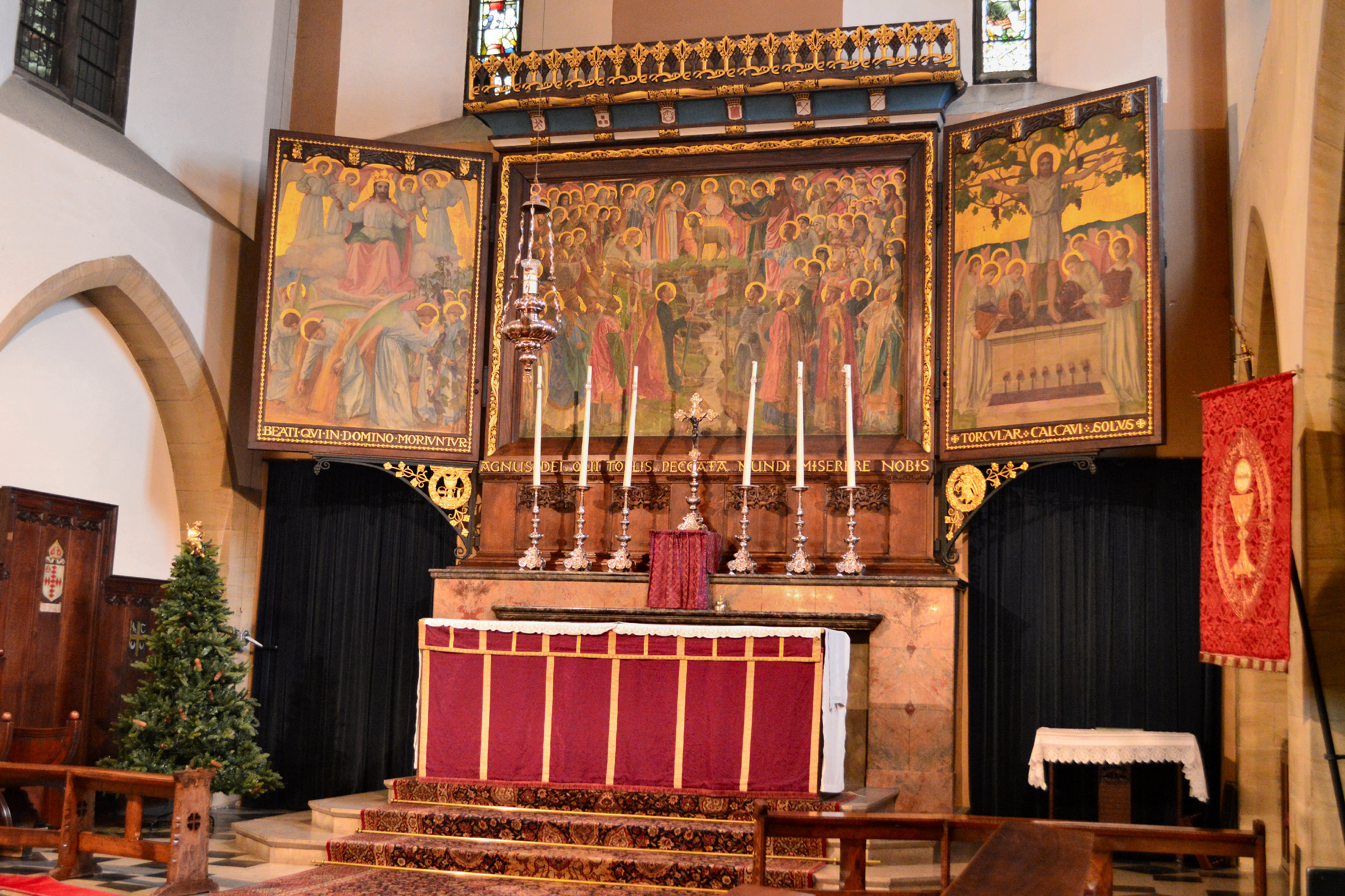
The Sanctuary

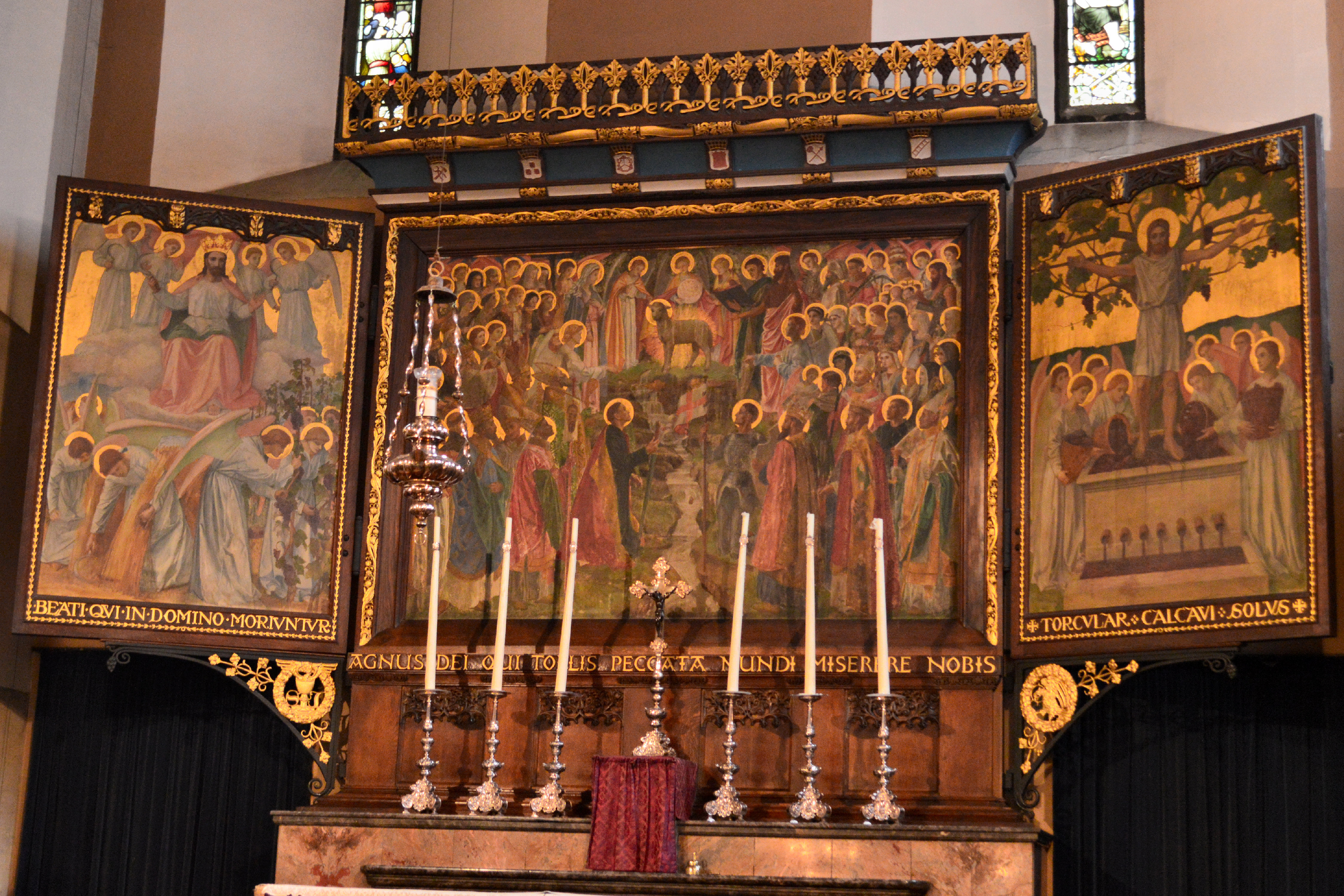
The Triptych by Nathaniel Westlake

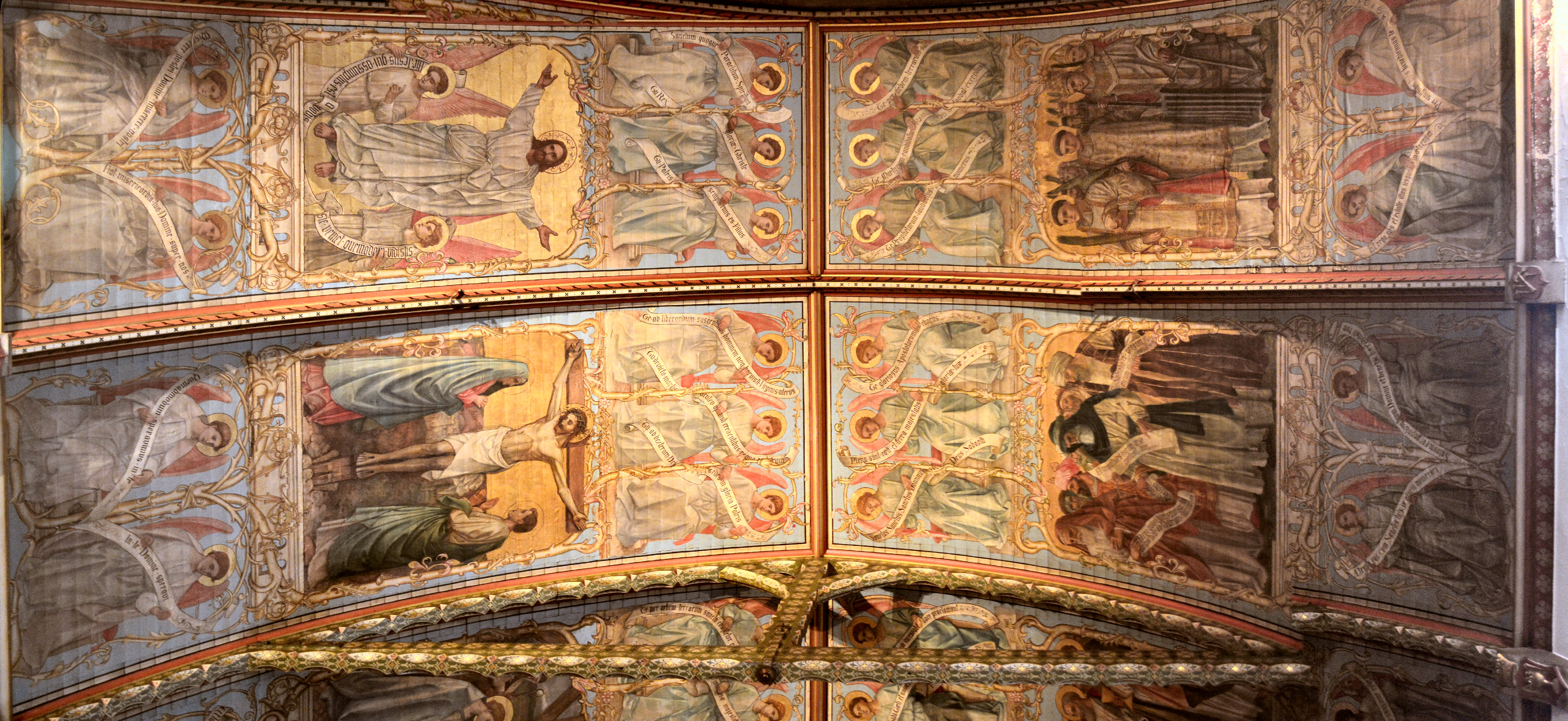
The chancel ceiling by Westlake

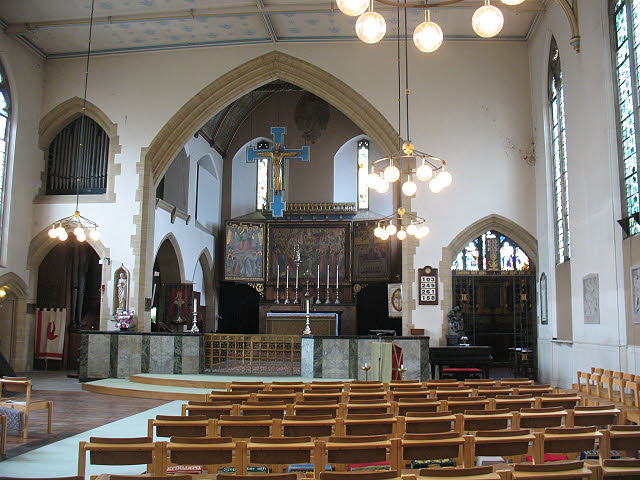
Interior view
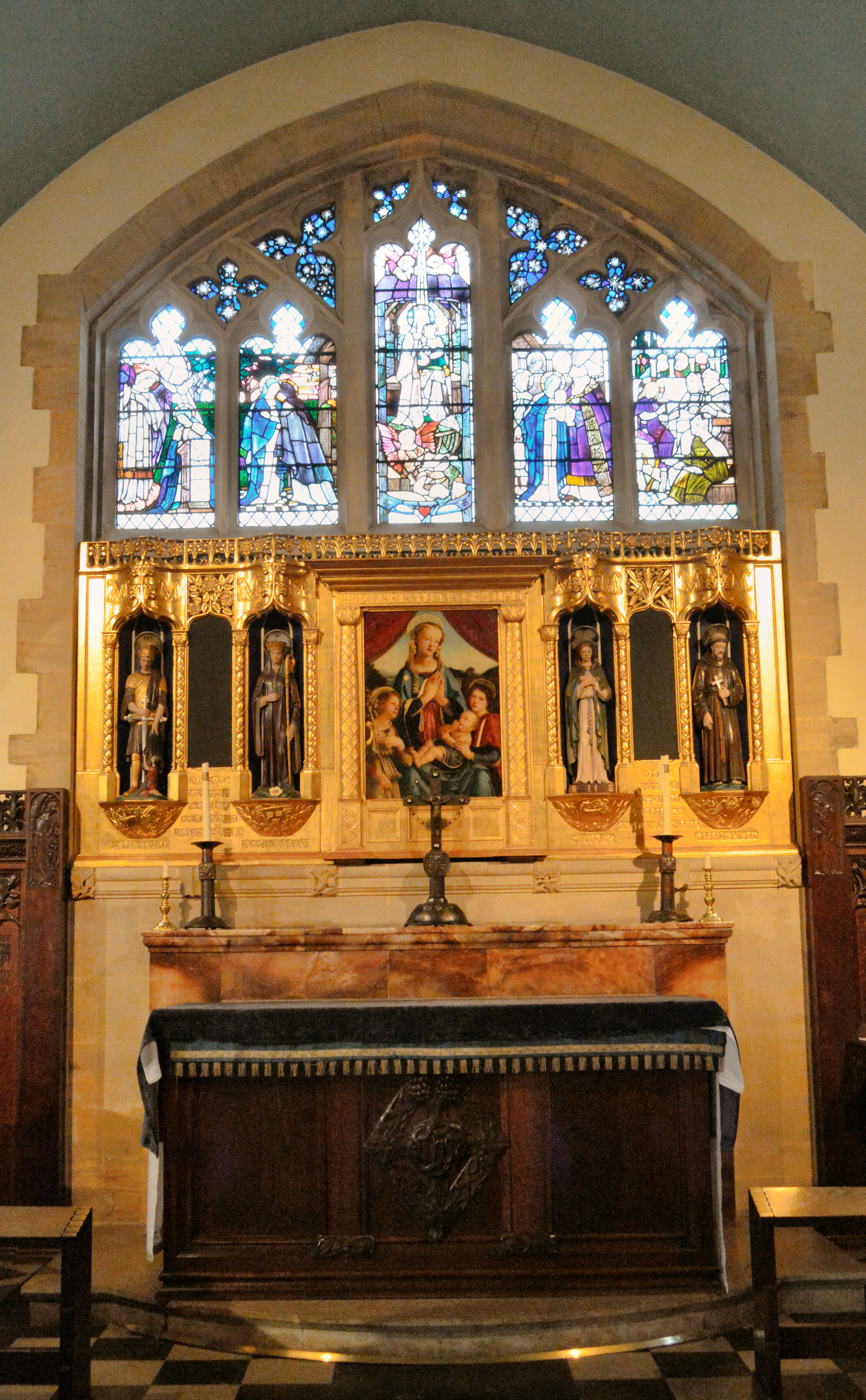
The recently restored Lady Chapel, restored in the 21st century

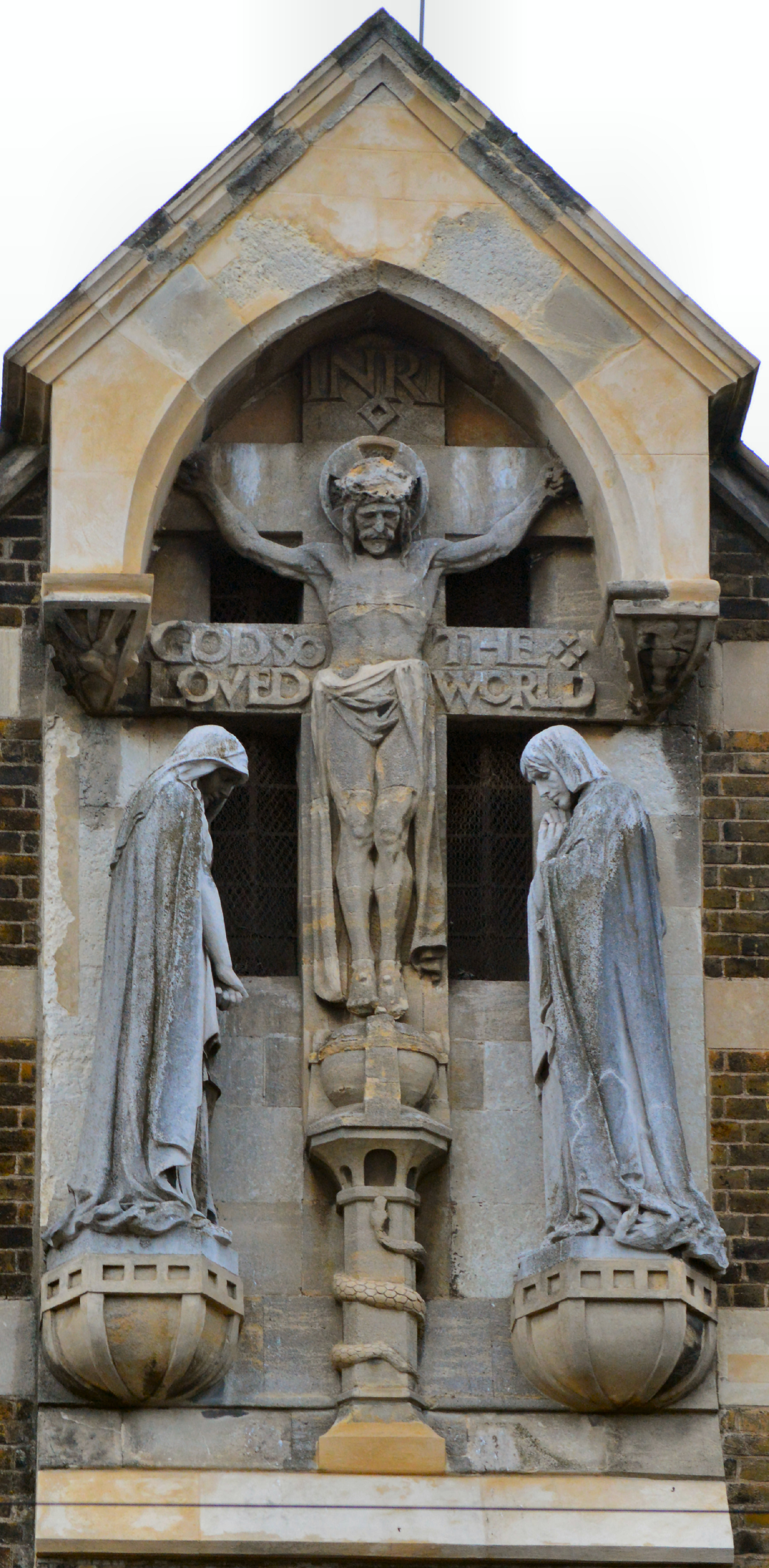
Calvary sculpture on the East end exterior by Richard Garbe (1876–1957)

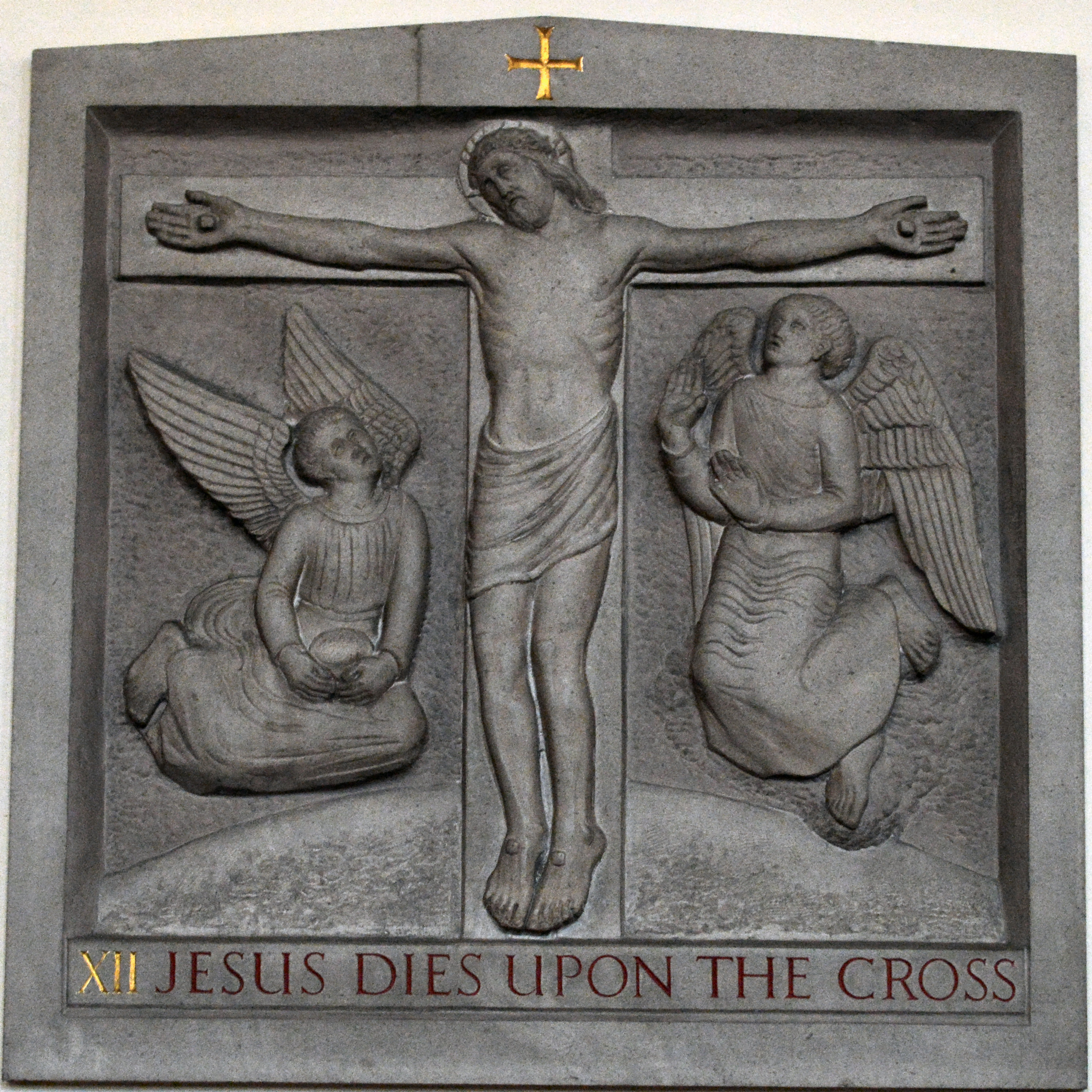
Stations of the Cross by Freda Skinner
