= St Matthias Church, Richmond =

Coordinates: 51.4567°N 0.2958°W

St Matthias, Richmond
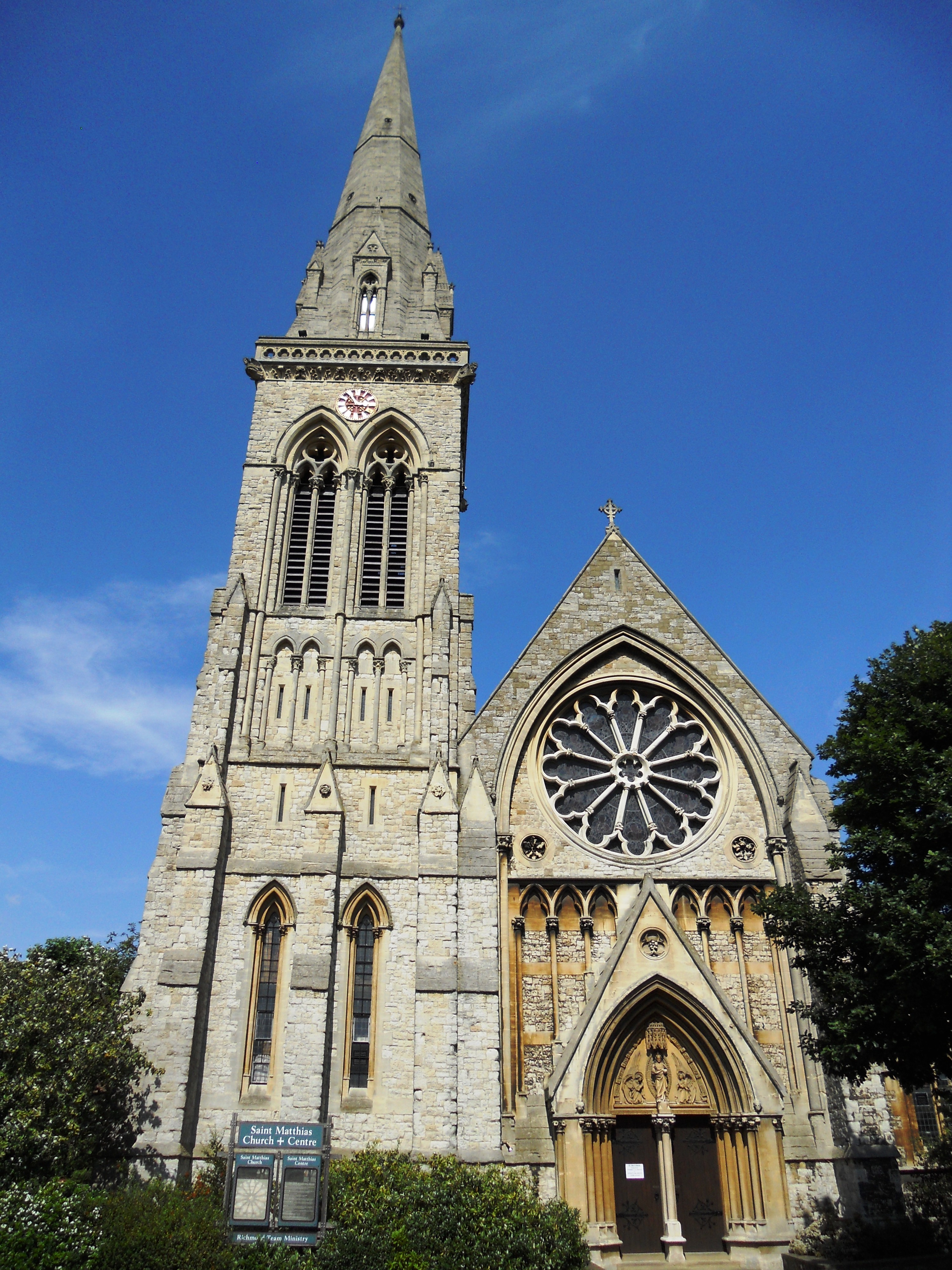
- St Matthias from the front

- Location in Greater London
- OS grid reference: TQ 18504 74455
- Location: Richmond, London
- Country: England
- Denomination: Church of England
- Website: www.richmondteamministry.org/stmatthias

Architecture
- Functional status: Active
- Heritage designation: Grade II listed building
- Architect(s): George Gilbert Scott (original church); Hutchison, Locke & Monk (1970s renovation)
- Style: Victorian Gothic
- Completed: 1857

Administration
- Diocese: Southwark
- Archdeaconry: Wandsworth
- Deanery: Richmond & Barnes
- Parish: Richmond St Mary Magdalene with St Matthias and St John the Divine

Clergy
- Vicar: Revd Anne Crawford

Listed Building – Grade II
- Official name: Church of St Matthias
- Designated: 10 January 1950
- Reference no.: 1065377

St Matthias Church is a Grade II listed Anglican church in Richmond, London. It was built in the Victorian Gothic style in 1857, and is described by Bridget Cherry and Nikolaus Pevsner as "the grandest church in Richmond". The architect was George Gilbert Scott.

The church is dedicated to Saint Matthias who was, according to the Acts of the Apostles, chosen by the apostles to replace Judas Iscariot following the latter's betrayal of Jesus and his subsequent death.

The church building is located at the top of Richmond Hill at the intersection of Friars Stile Road, Kings Road, and Church Road. At 195 feet (59 m), the spire of the church is a familiar landmark for miles around.

The church was renovated in the 1970s by the architects Hutchison, Locke & Monk.

St Matthias' Church is part of the Richmond Team Ministry, which also includes the churches of St John the Divine and St Mary Magdalene.

== Gallery ==
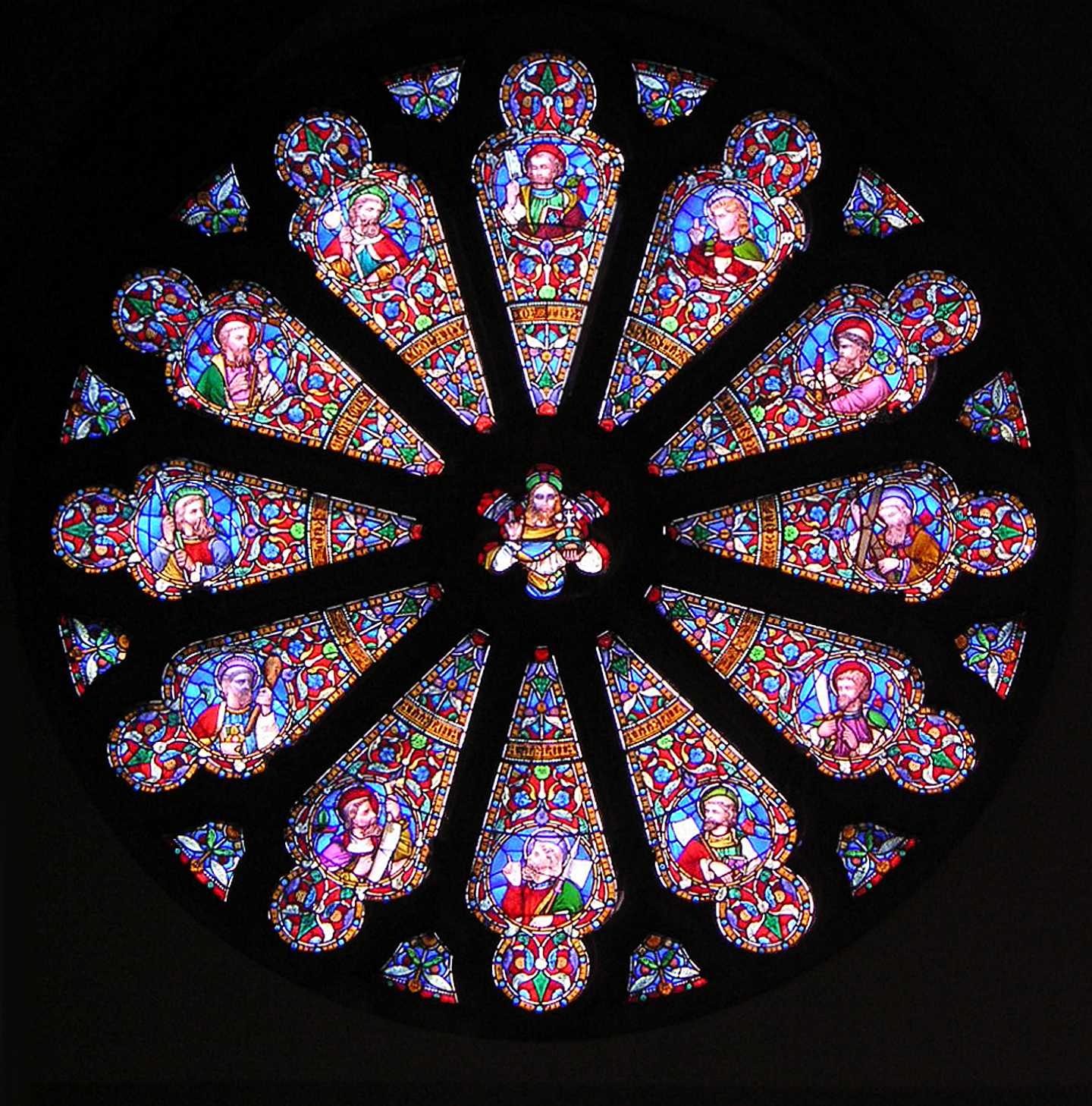
The rose window

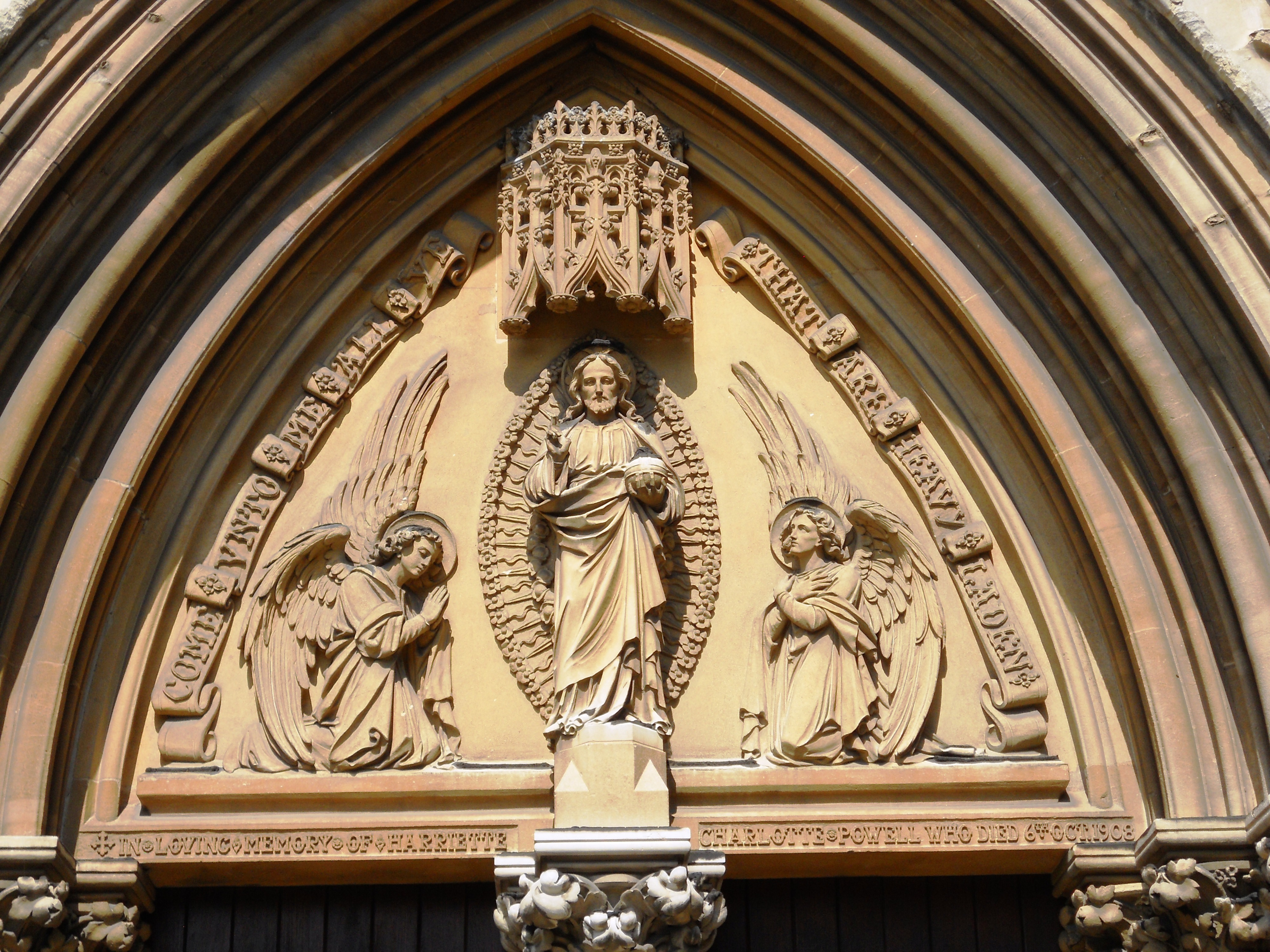
Tympanum over the main door
