= Deveral =

Hamlet in Cornwall, England

Coordinates: 50.169°N 5.373°W

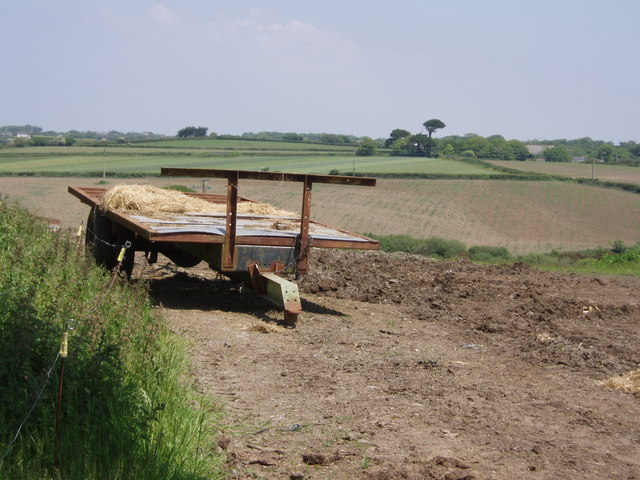
- Farmland at Deveral

- Location within Cornwall
- OS grid reference: SW592353
- Civil parish: Gwinear-Gwithian
- Unitary authority: Cornwall
- Ceremonial county: Cornwall
- Region: South West
- Country: England
- Sovereign state: United Kingdom
- Post town: Hayle
- Postcode district: TR27

Deveral is a hamlet in the parish of Gwinear-Gwithian, Cornwall, England.
