= The Wounded Cuirassier =

1814 painting by Théodore Géricault

- Le Cuirassier blessé quittant le feu (French)
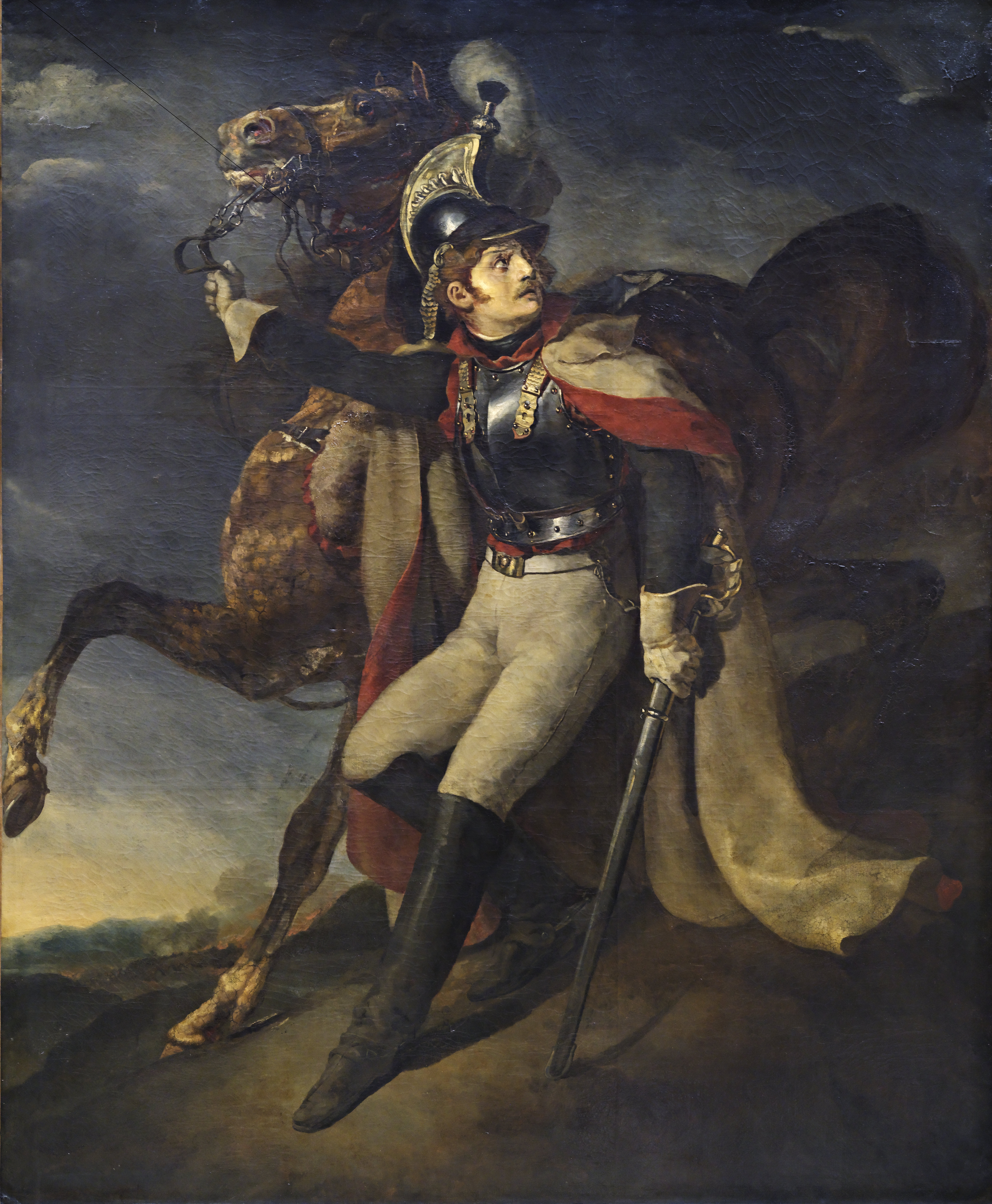
- Artist: Théodore Géricault
- Year: 1814
- Medium: Oil on canvas
- Dimensions: 358 cm × 294 cm (141 in × 116 in)
- Location: Musée du Louvre, Paris Brooklyn Museum, New York

The Wounded Cuirassier (French: Le Cuirassier blessé quittant le feu) is an 1814 oil painting by the French Romantic painter Théodore Géricault of a French Imperial Army cuirassier descending a slope with his horse amidst a battle. Géricault chose to reverse course from his previous military paintings which glorified their subjects and instead focused on the theme of defeat. Displayed at the Salon of 1814, held at the Louvre on 5 November 1814, the painting captured the French national mood following France's defeat in the Napoleonic Wars. There are no visible wounds on the cuirassier and the painting's title has sometimes been interpreted to refer to soldier's injured pride. The final salon version of The Wounded Cuirassier is held in the Louvre and the smaller study version is located at the Brooklyn Museum.

== Artist and setting ==
Géricault studied in Paris where he created his first major work, The Charging Chasseur, for the Paris Salon of 1812. His next major Salon submission was The Wounded Cuirassier in 1814.

In the months before the exhibition, Paris fell to the sixth coalition and Napoleon was defeated and exiled from France. After The Wounded Cuirassier received a negative response from critics, Géricault entered a long period of artistic study, and in 1816 he left France to find inspiration in Rome.

== Creation ==
Géricault rushed to make The Wounded Cuirassier in only three weeks and created five separate sketches and drafts before the final version. Perhaps as a result of its hurried production, the message of the painting was not entirely clear to critics.

== Style and composition ==
Géricault uses a similar style and technique to his previous works, yet his approach to battle painting was unique in the period. He elected not to show a wound on the soldier, perhaps suggesting to viewers that the wound is internal and extends to the nation. The soldier and horse are shown in a tense and vulnerable state; the soldier uses his sword as a sort of crutch. Géricault also used the horse to convey emotion. In The Wounded Cuirassier, he uses the horse's facial expressions and uneasy footing to emphasize the unsteadiness and terror of the soldier.

== Reception ==
In 2003, James J. Sheehan compared The Wounded Cuirassier to The Chasseur in the Woods by Caspar David Friedrich and The Third of May 1808 by Francisco Goya. All three paintings were exhibited for the first time in 1814 and depict the Napoleonic Wars, each from its own perspective. Sheenan stressed their differences but attributed these to the characters of the painters rather than national character.
