= Cochereau =

Cochereau (French pronunciation: [koʃ.ʁo]) is a French surname. Notable people with the surname include:

- Léon Matthieu Cochereau (1793–1817), French painter
- Pierre Cochereau (1924–1984), French musician and composer
