= Salon of 1814 =

1814 art exhibition in Paris

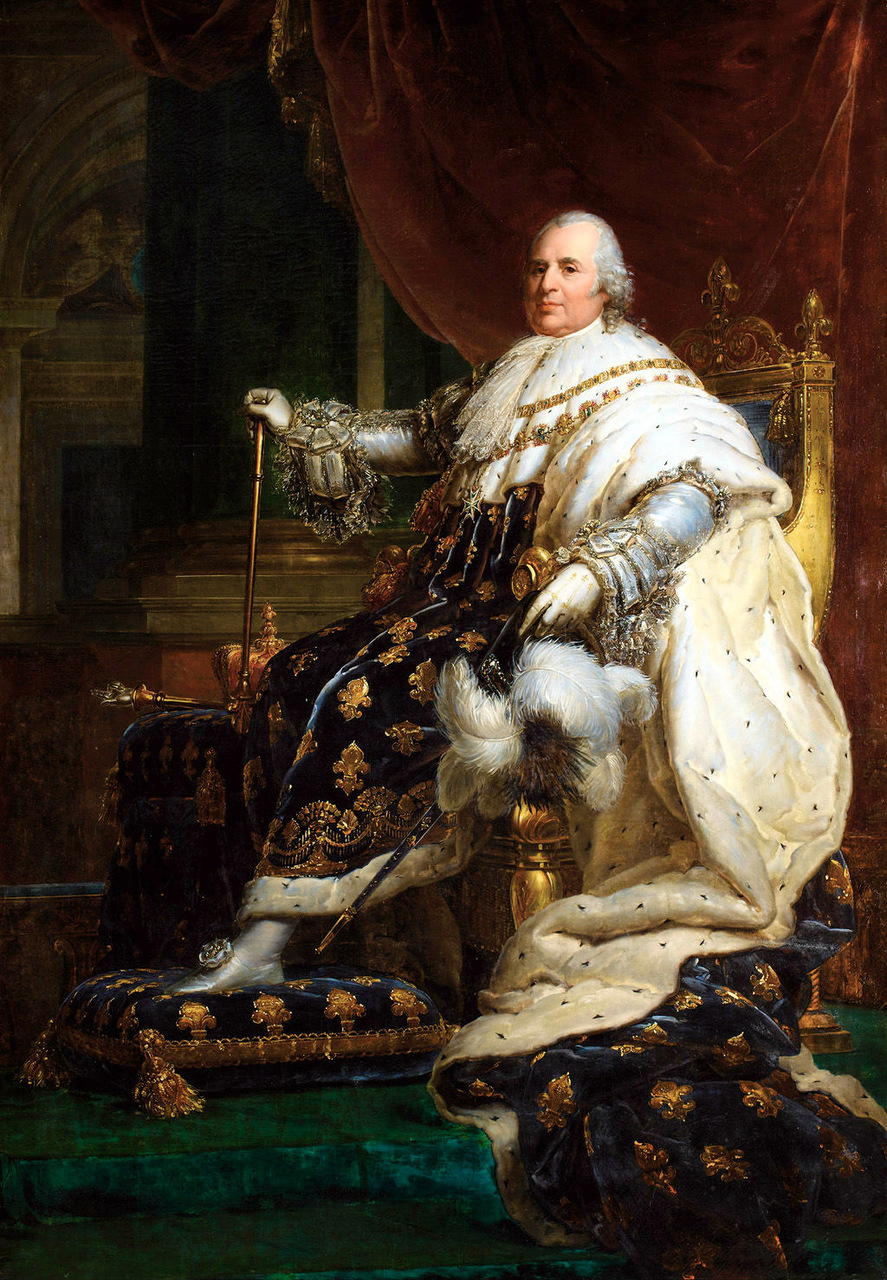
Portrait of Louis XVIII by François Gérard. The artist rushed to complete the painting in time for the Salon

The Salon of 1814 was an art exhibition held at the Louvre in Paris from 5 November 1814. It was the first Salon to be held since the defeat of Napoleon and the Bourbon Restoration that brought Louis XVIII to the throne. It featured a mixture of paintings and works of sculpture.

One of the most celebrated artists of the Napoleonic regime Jacques-Louis David had gone into exile and was absent from the Salon. However, Léon Matthieu Cochereau exhibited his Interior of David's Studio. Several of the works had appeared at earlier exhibitions such as Théodore Gericault's The Charging Chasseur which had featured in the Salon of 1812. By contrast Géricault's The Wounded Cuirassier was shown for the first time. Jean Auguste Dominique Ingres wanted his entries "to cause some noise" and demonstrate the supremacy of history painting above all other genres. Anicet Lemonnier enjoyed success with his depiction of eighteenth century Paris In the Salon of Madame Geoffrin in 1755. British artist John Crome, who was visiting Paris, exhibited a view of Norwich. This anticipated the breakthrough by British landscape paintings a decade later at the Salon of 1824.

François Gérard, a noted painter of the Napoleonic era, rushed to complete his Portrait of Louis XVIII in time for the exhibition. It was followed by the Salon of 1817 which was more overt in its support of the Bourbon dynasty.

== Gallery ==
=== Paintings ===
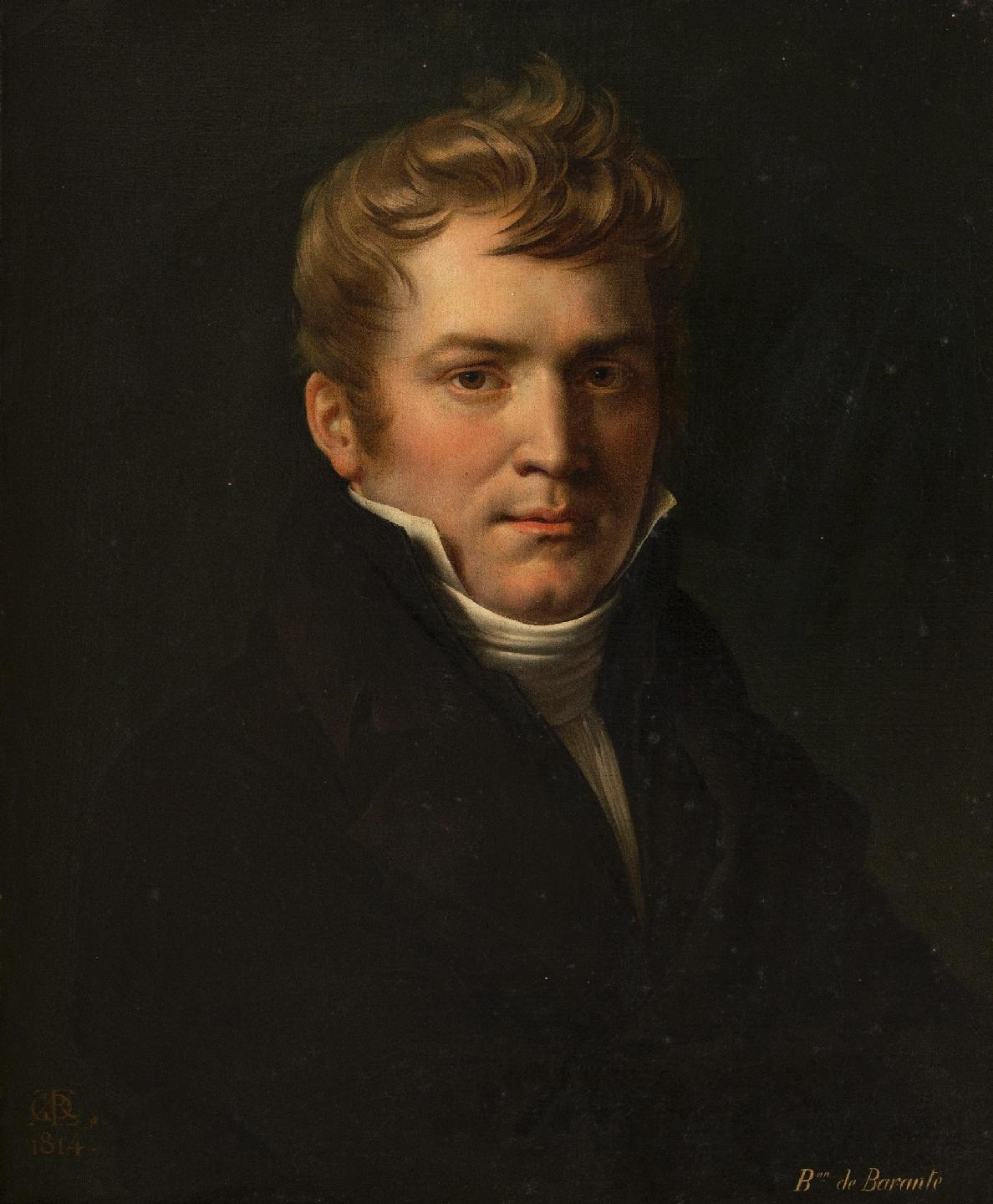
Portrait of Prosper de Barante by Girodet

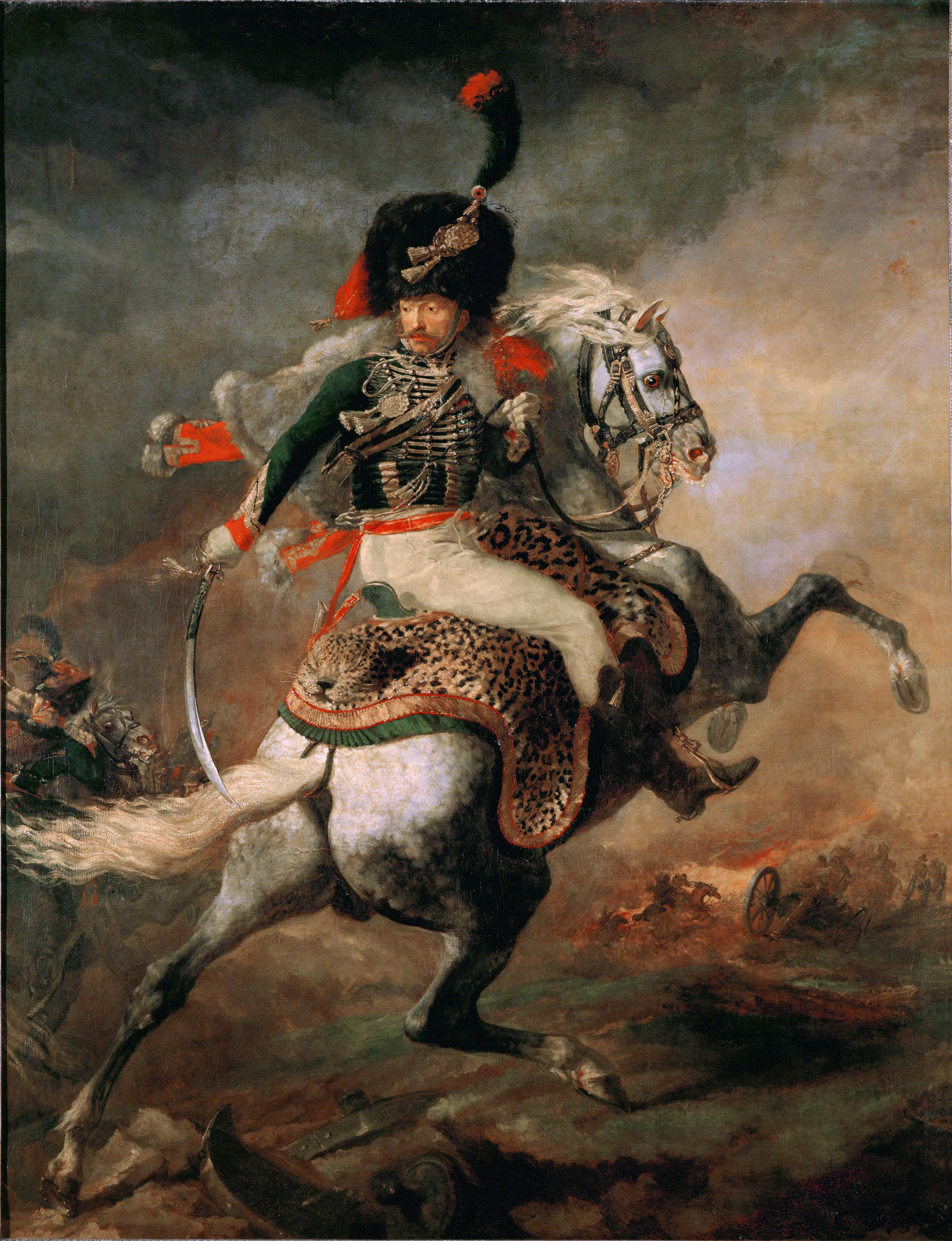
The Charging Chasseur by Théodore Géricault

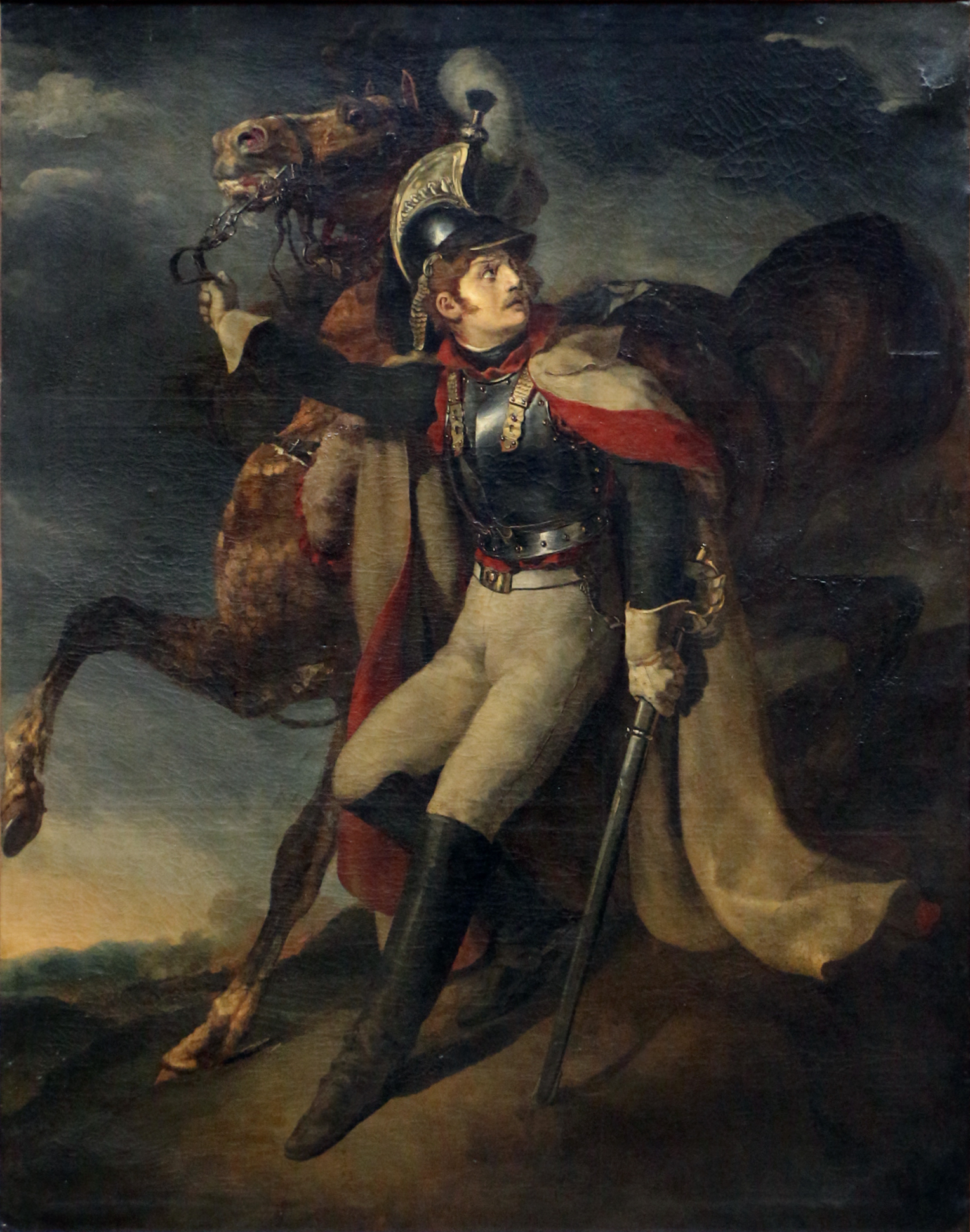
The Wounded Cuirassier by Théodore Géricault

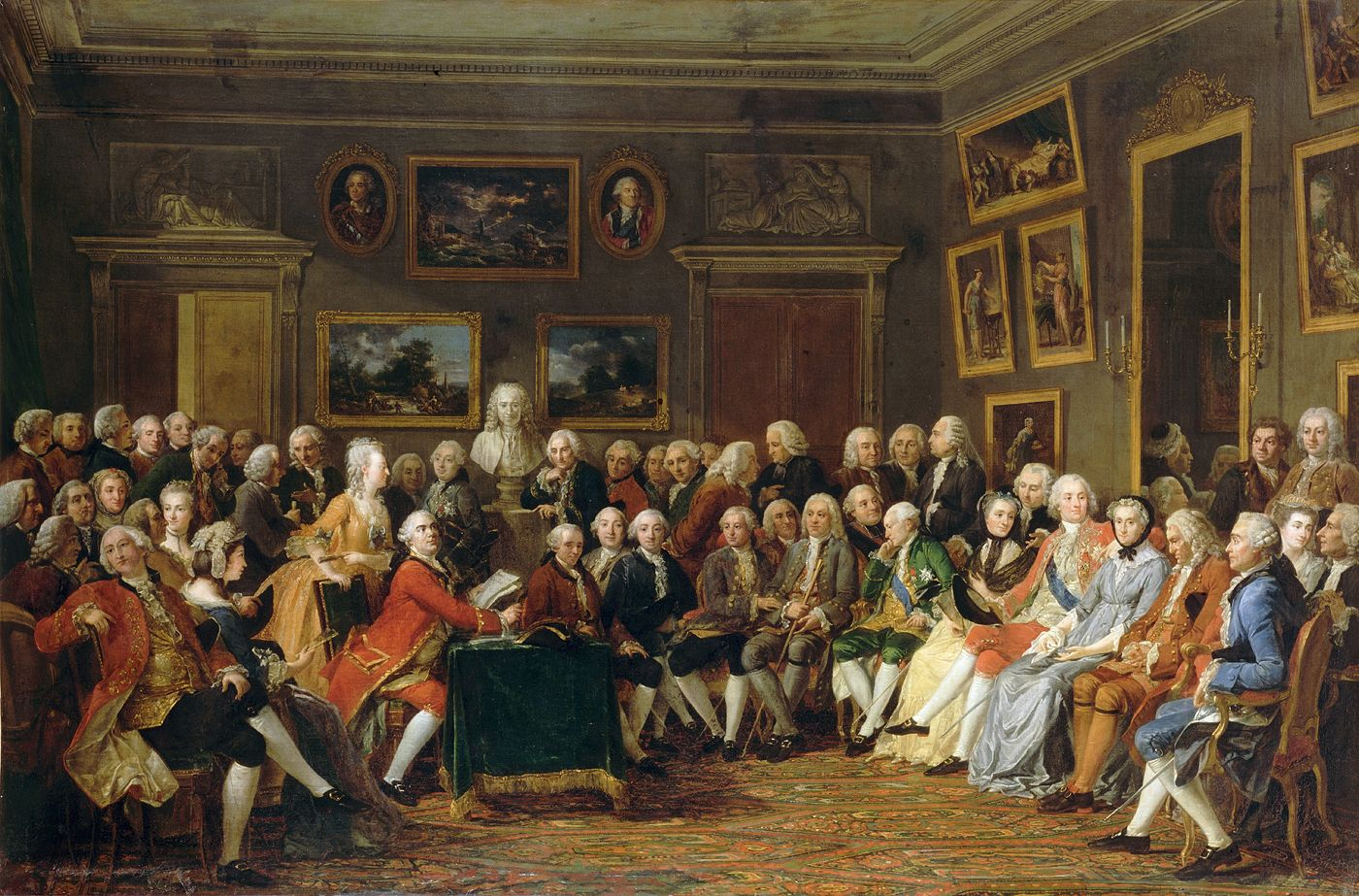
In the Salon of Madame Geoffrin in 1755 by Anicet Charles Gabriel Lemonnier

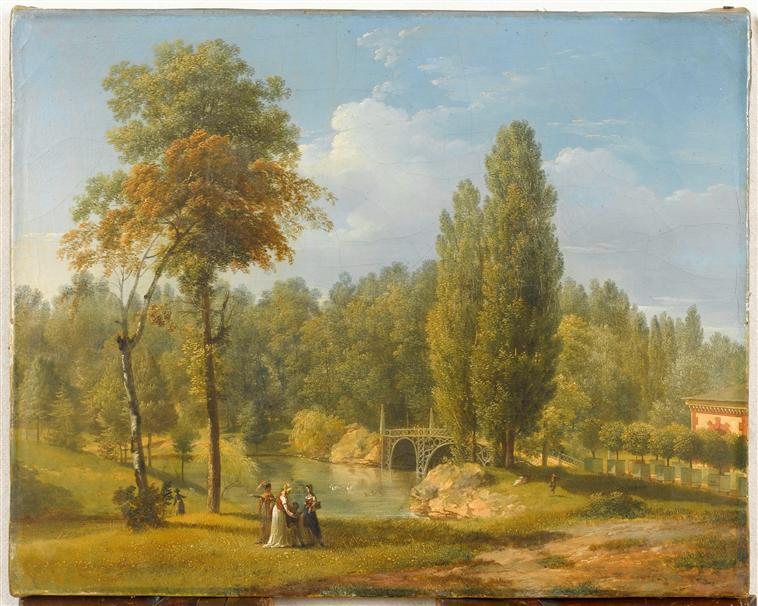
Vue du parc du Raincy by Pierre-Antoine Marchais

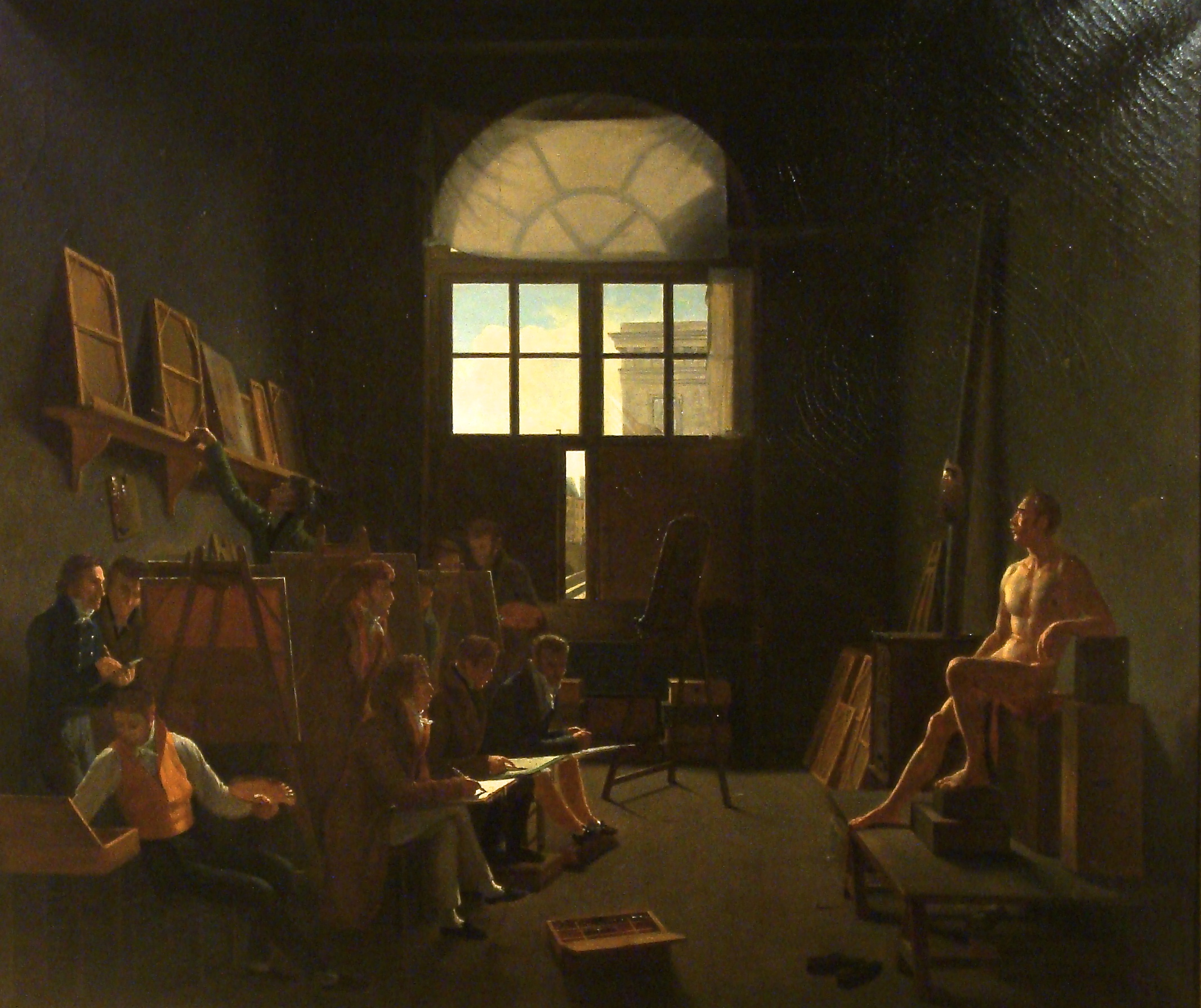
Interior of David's Studio by Léon Matthieu Cochereau

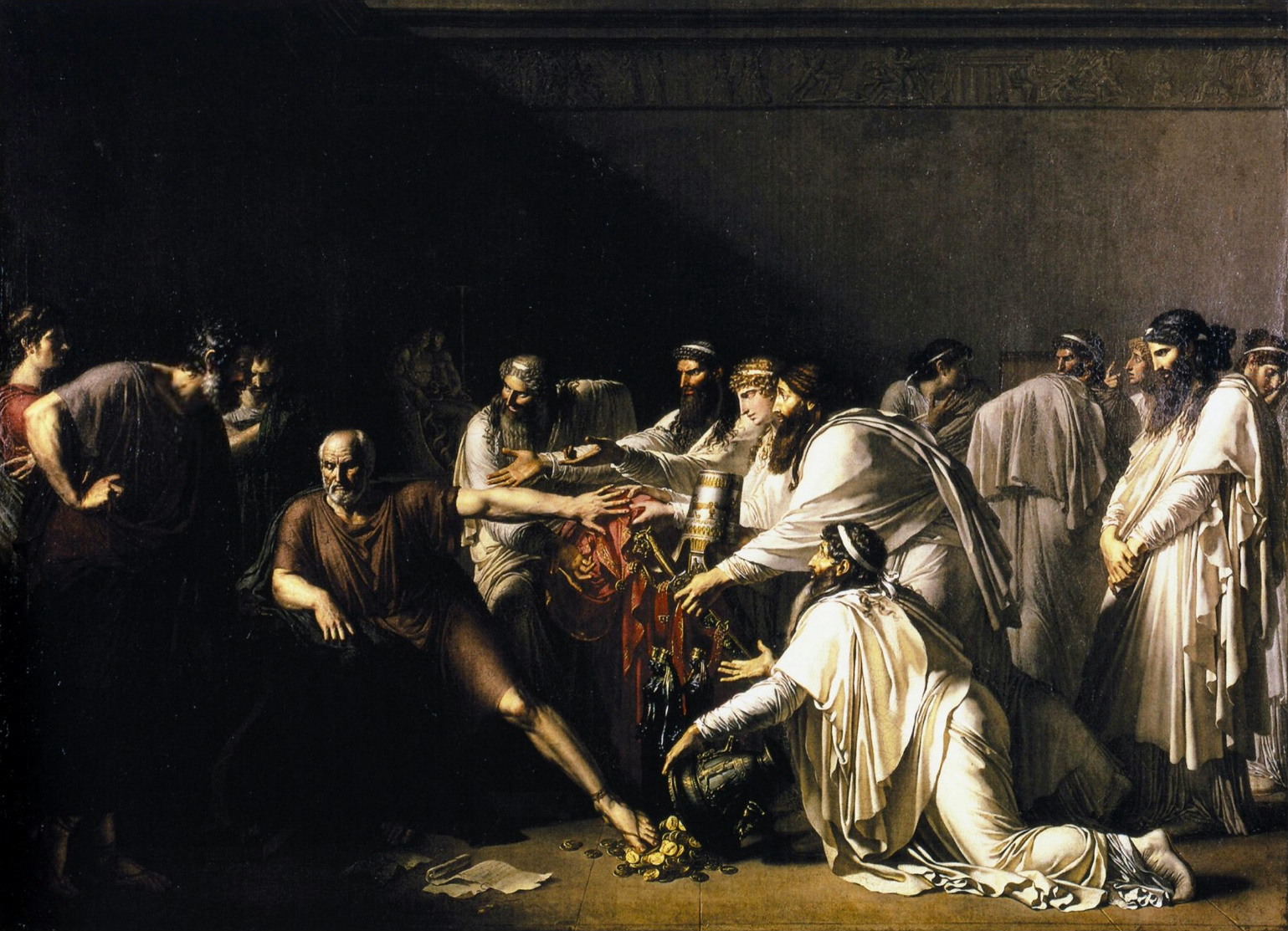
Hippocrates Refusing the Gifts of Artaxerxes by Girodet

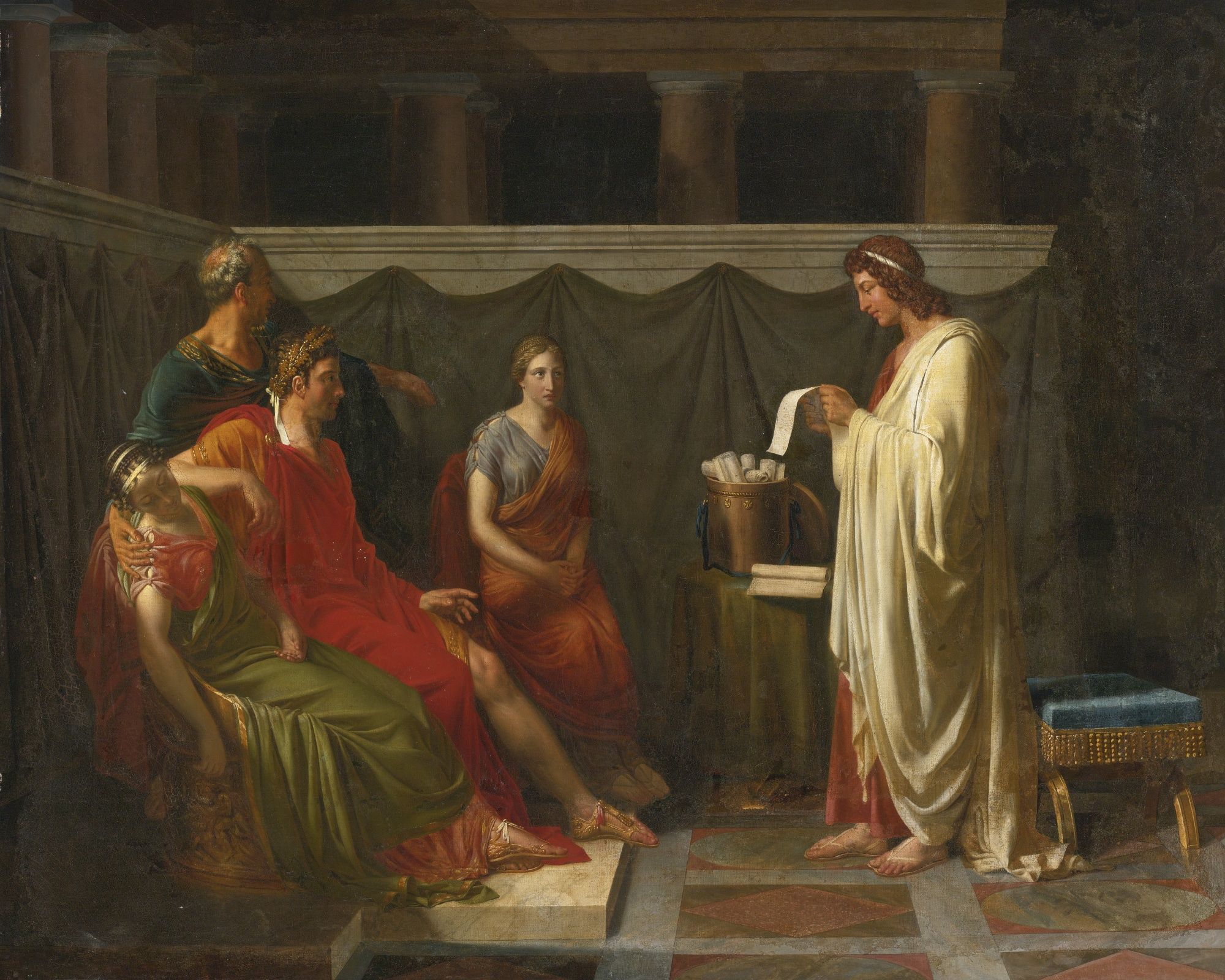
Virgil Reading his Aeneid to Augustus by Jean-Bruno Gassies

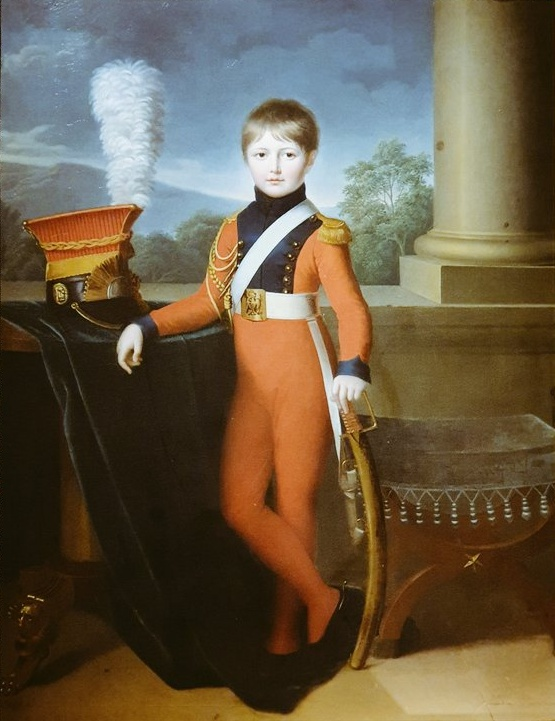
Portrait of Napoléon-Joseph de Colbert-Chabanais by Jeanne-Elisabeth Chaudet

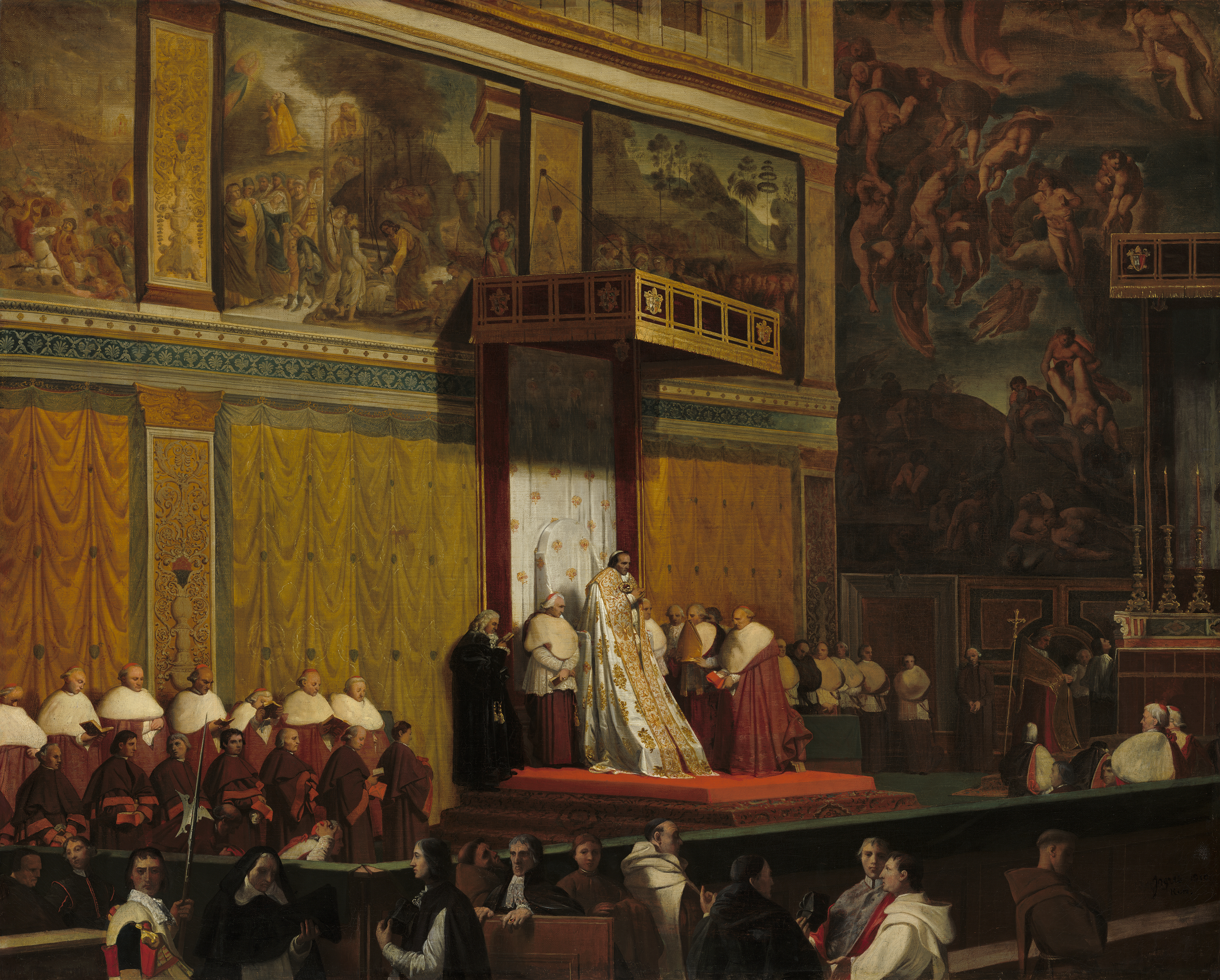
Pope Pius VII in the Sistine Chapel by Jean-Auguste-Dominique Ingres

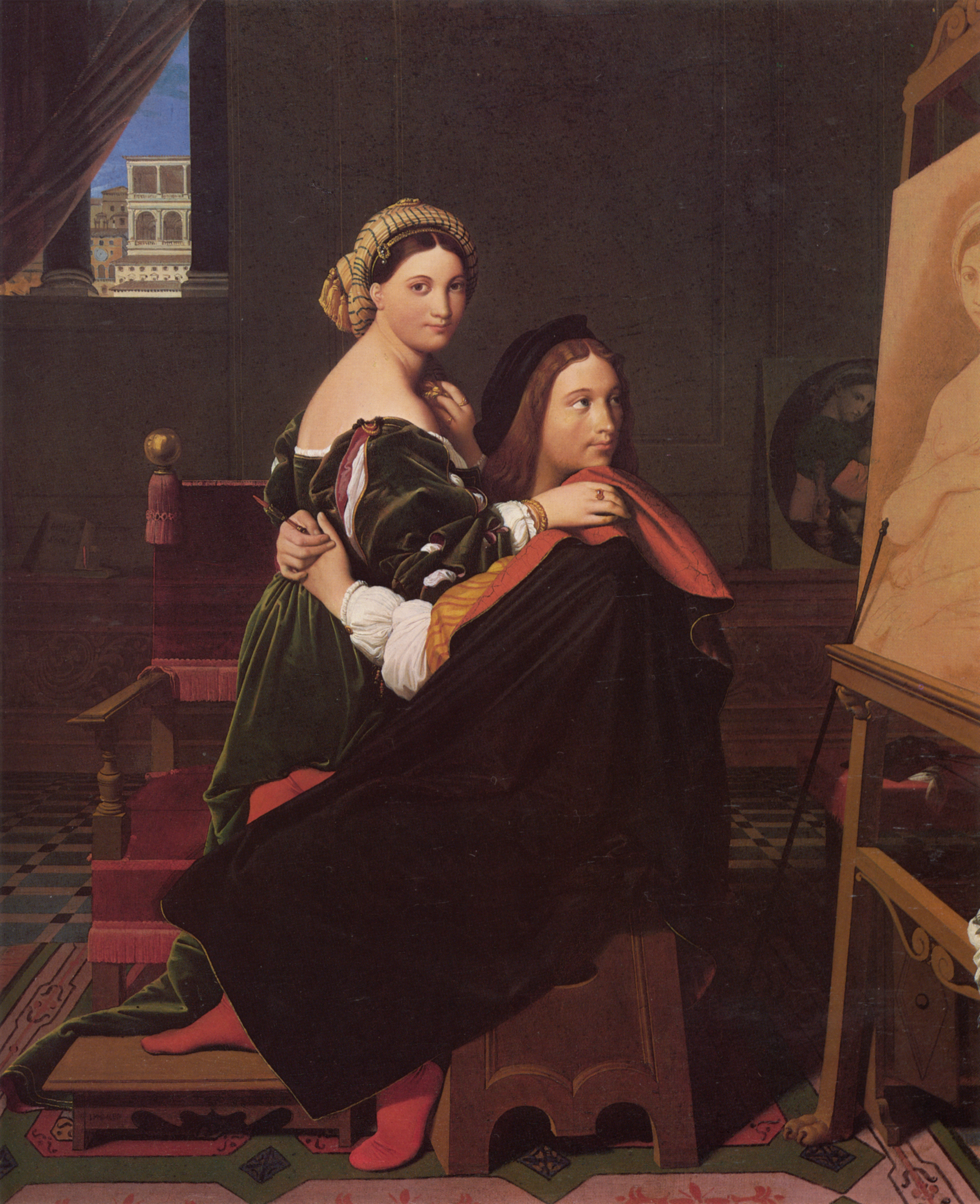
Raphael and La Fornarina by Jean-Auguste-Dominique Ingres

The Emperor Augustus Rebuking Cornelius Cinna for His Treachery by Étienne-Jean Delécluze

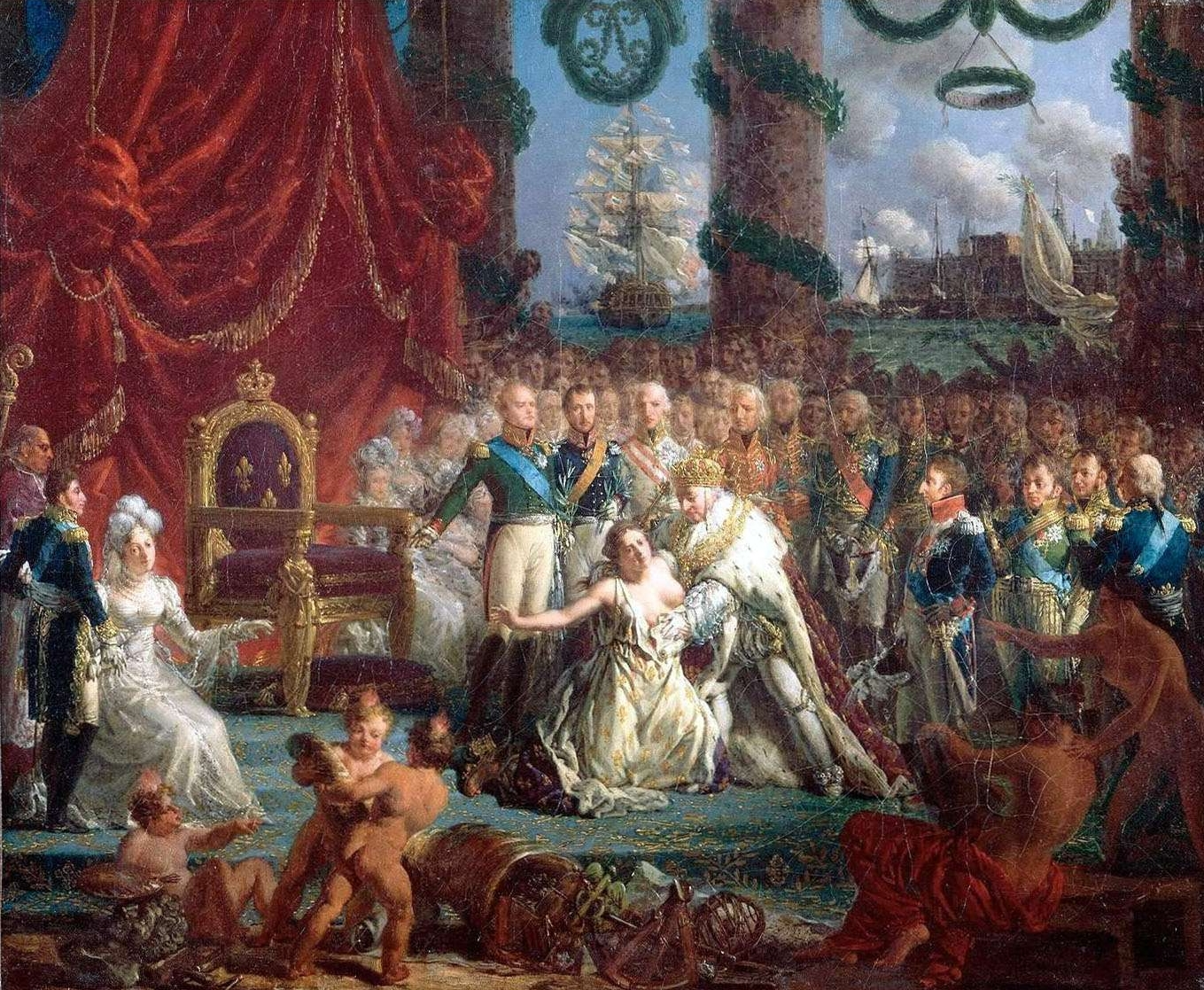
Louis XVIII Raising France from Its Ruins by Louis-Philippe Crépin

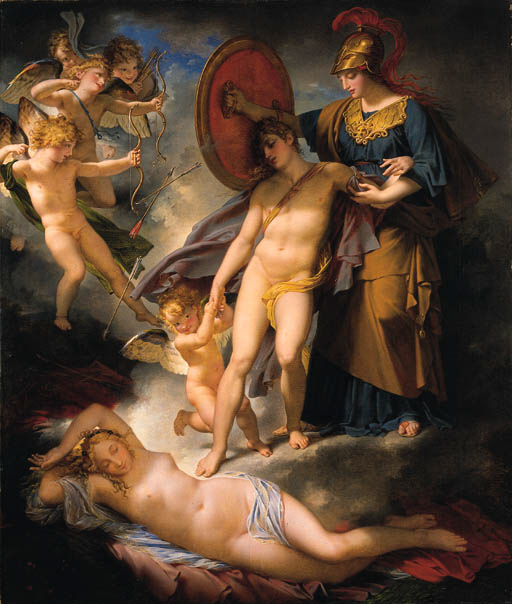
Wisdom Defending Youth Against Love by Charles Meynier

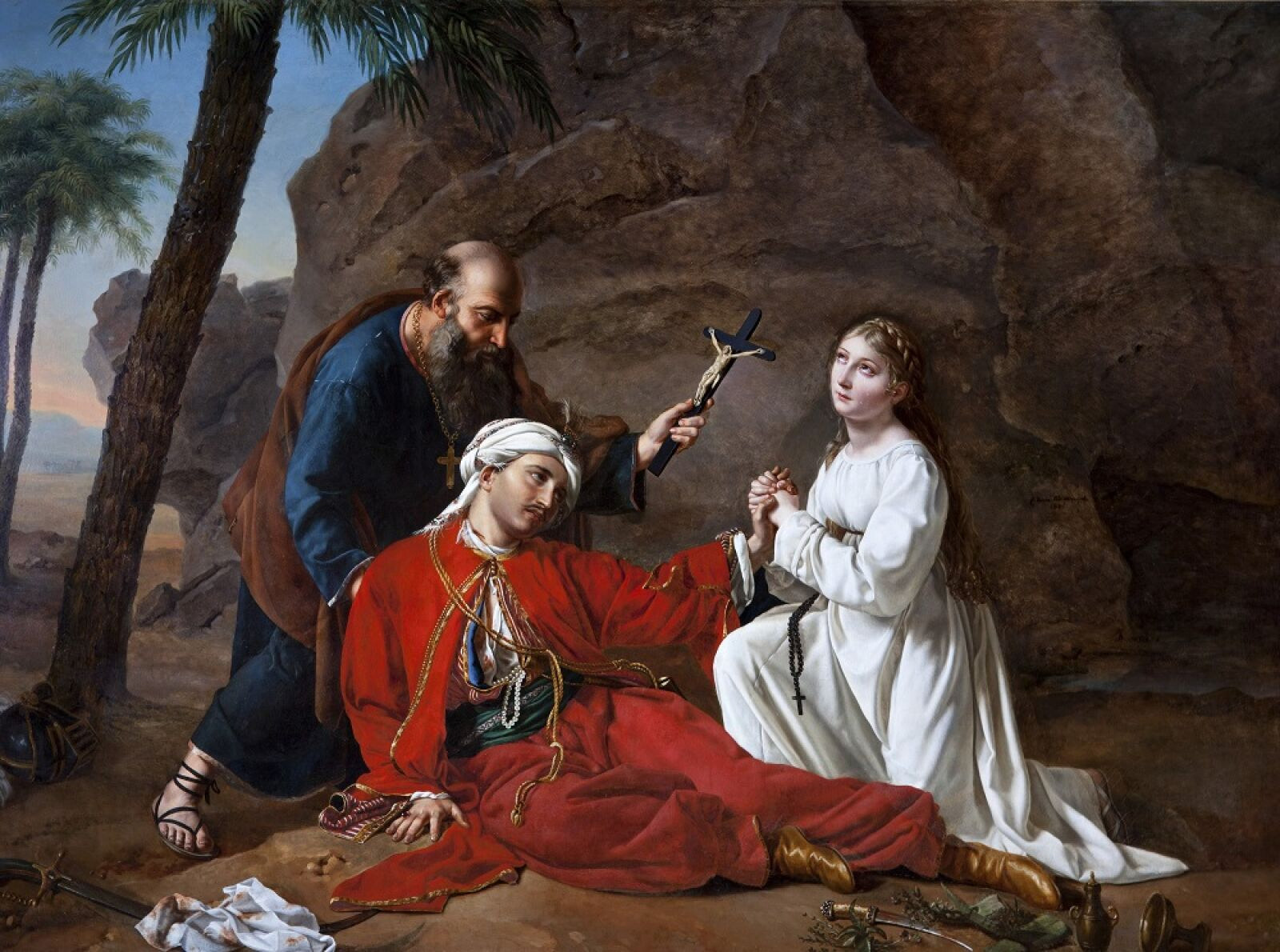
The Death of Malek-Adhel by Césarine Davin-Mirvault

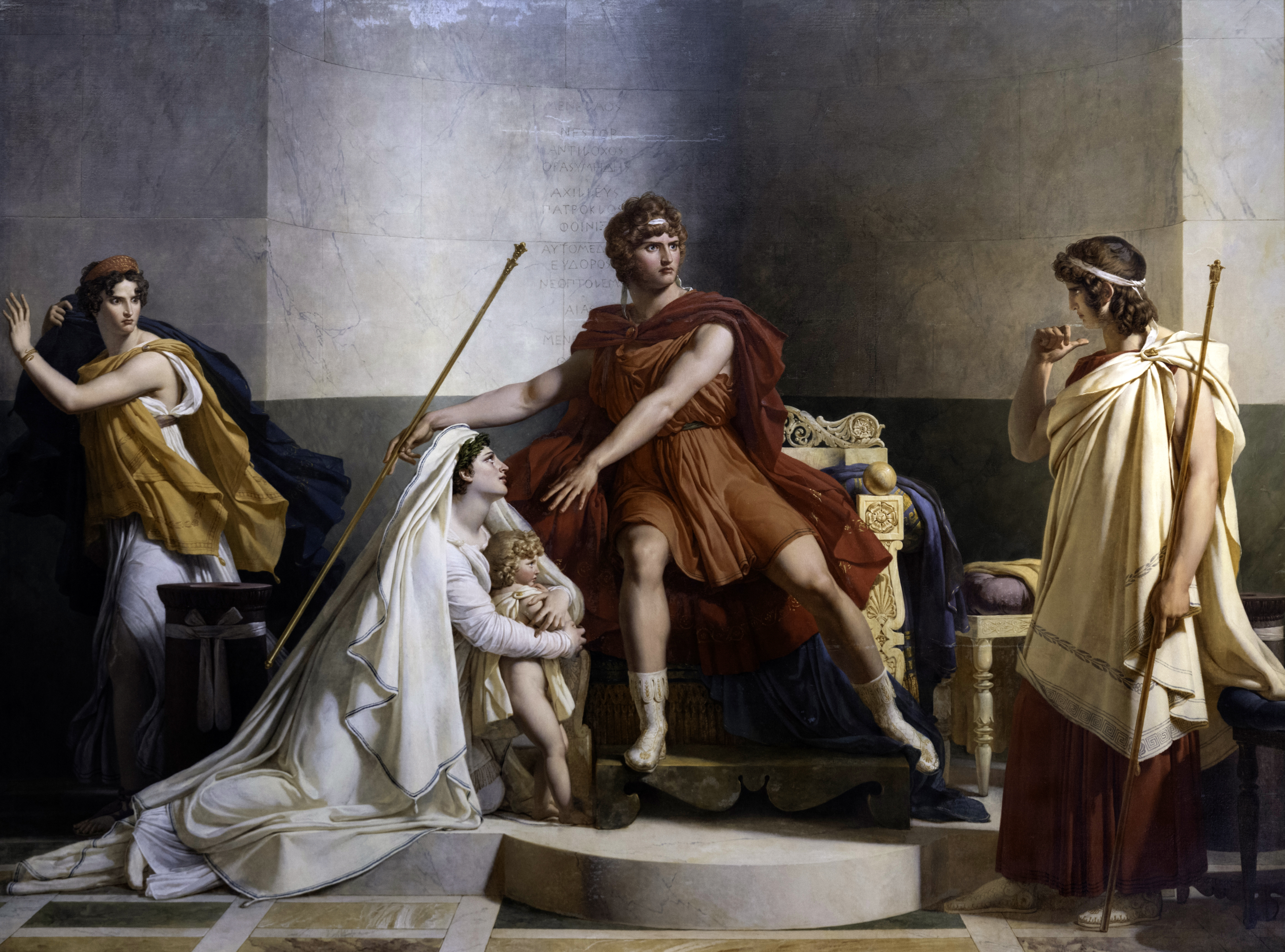
Andromache and Pyrrhus by Pierre-Narcisse Guérin

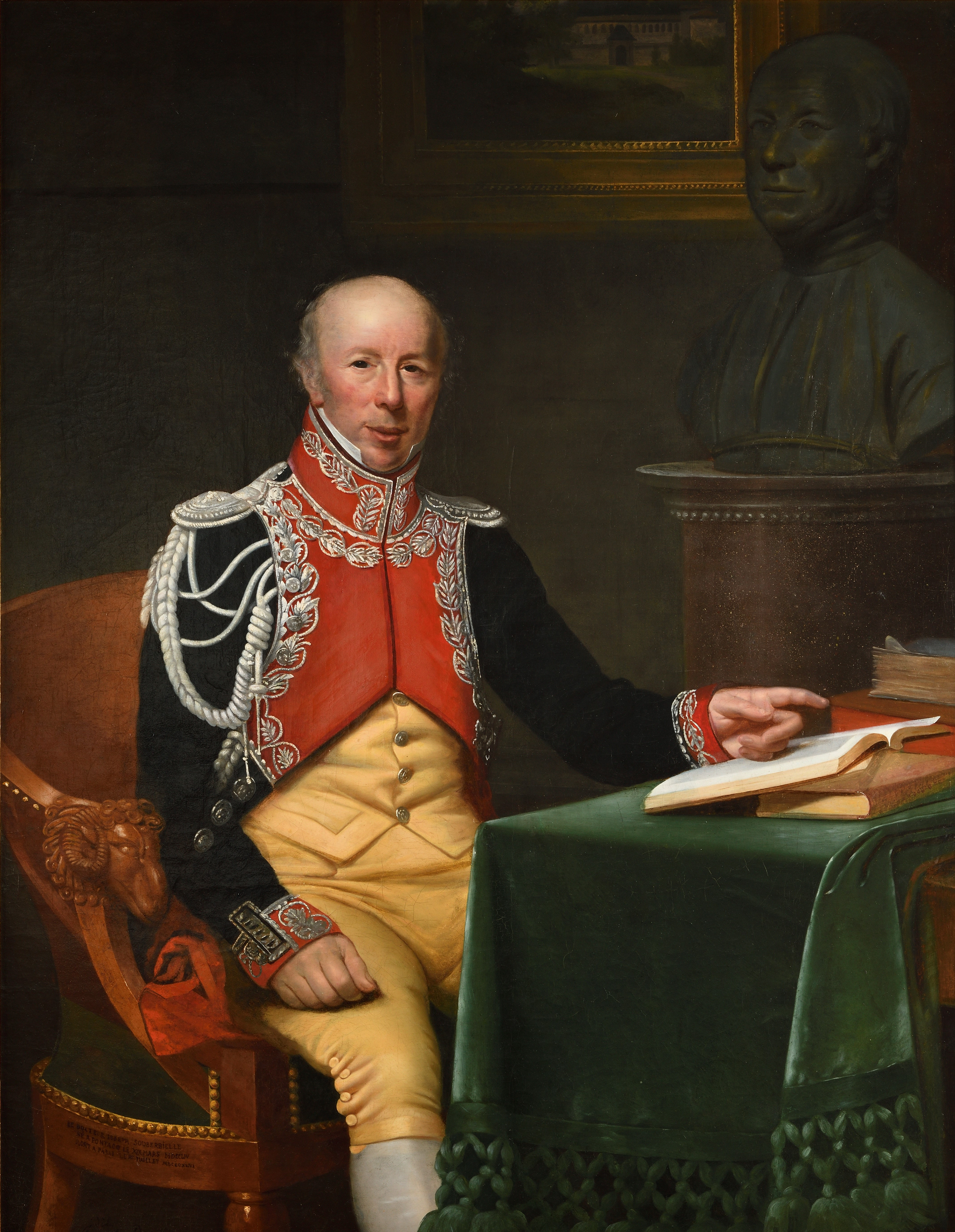
Portrait of Joseph Souberbielle by Adèle Romany

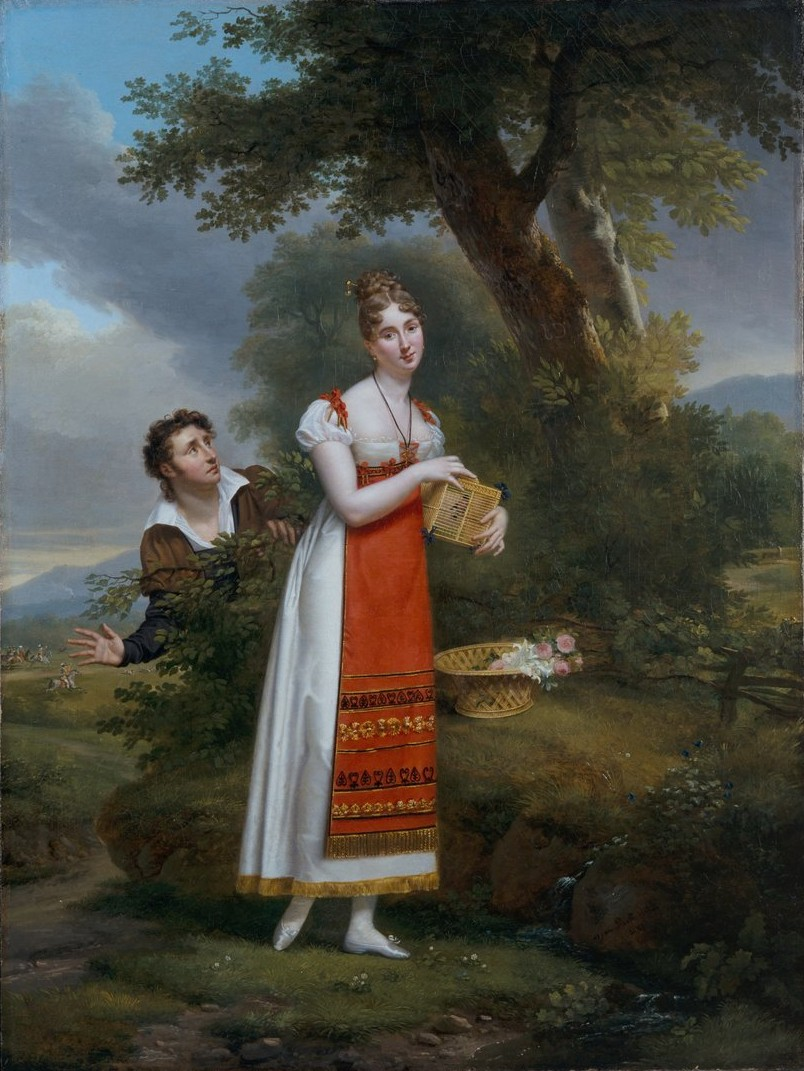
Portrait of Mme Granier in the role of Colinette by Adèle Romany

=== Sculptures ===
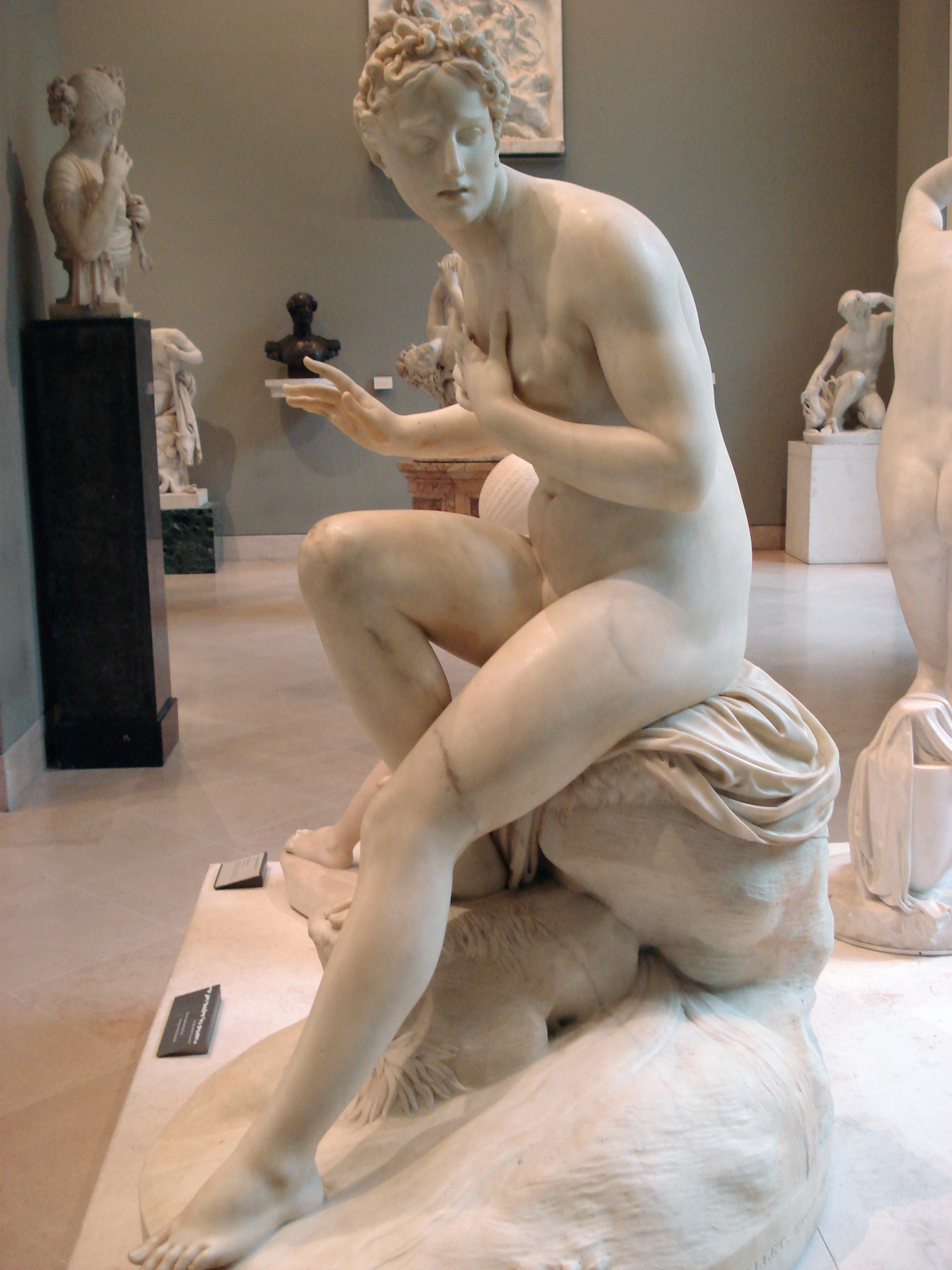
Suzanne Bathing by Pierre-Nicolas Beauvallet

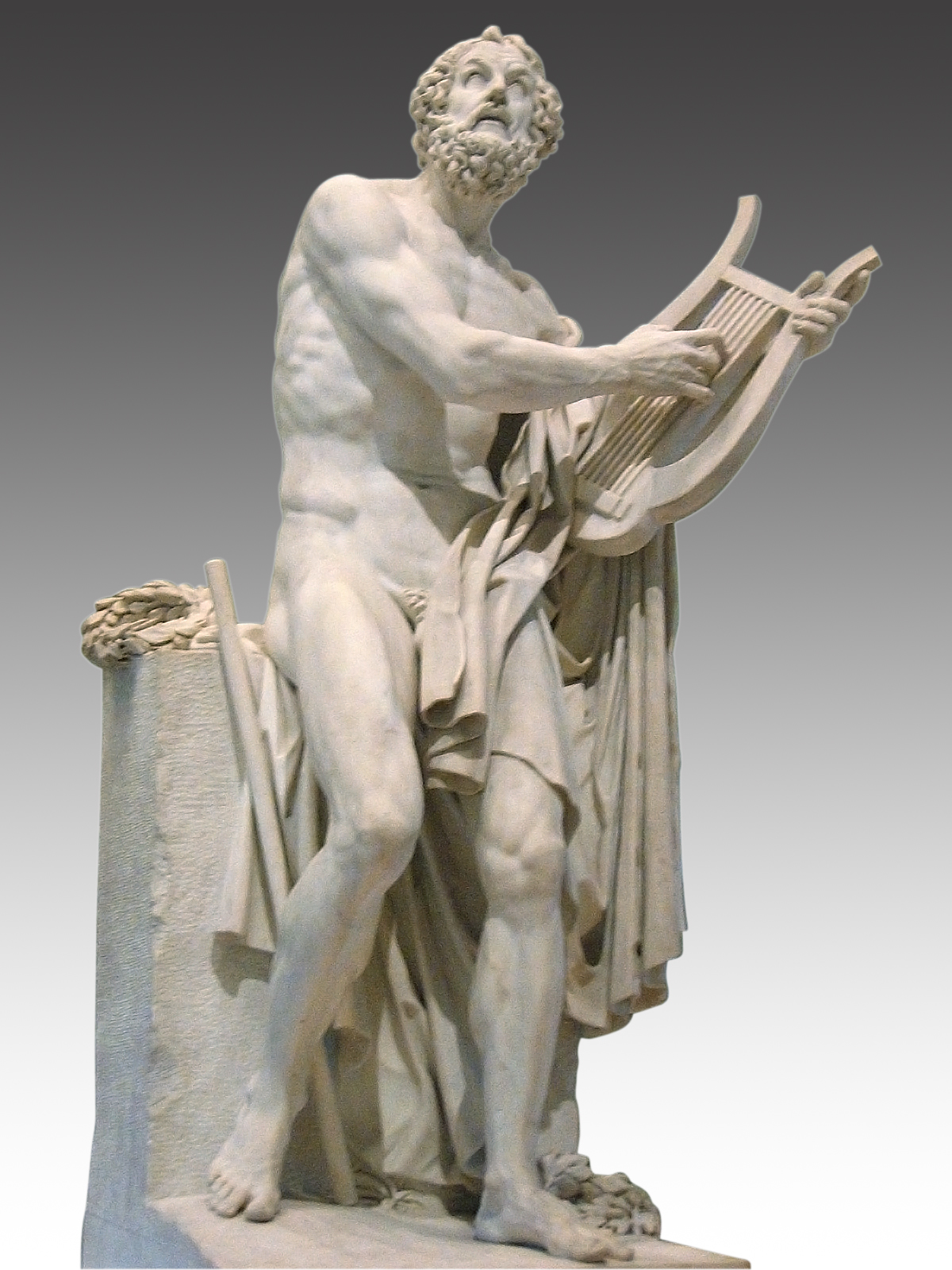
Homer by Philippe-Laurent Roland

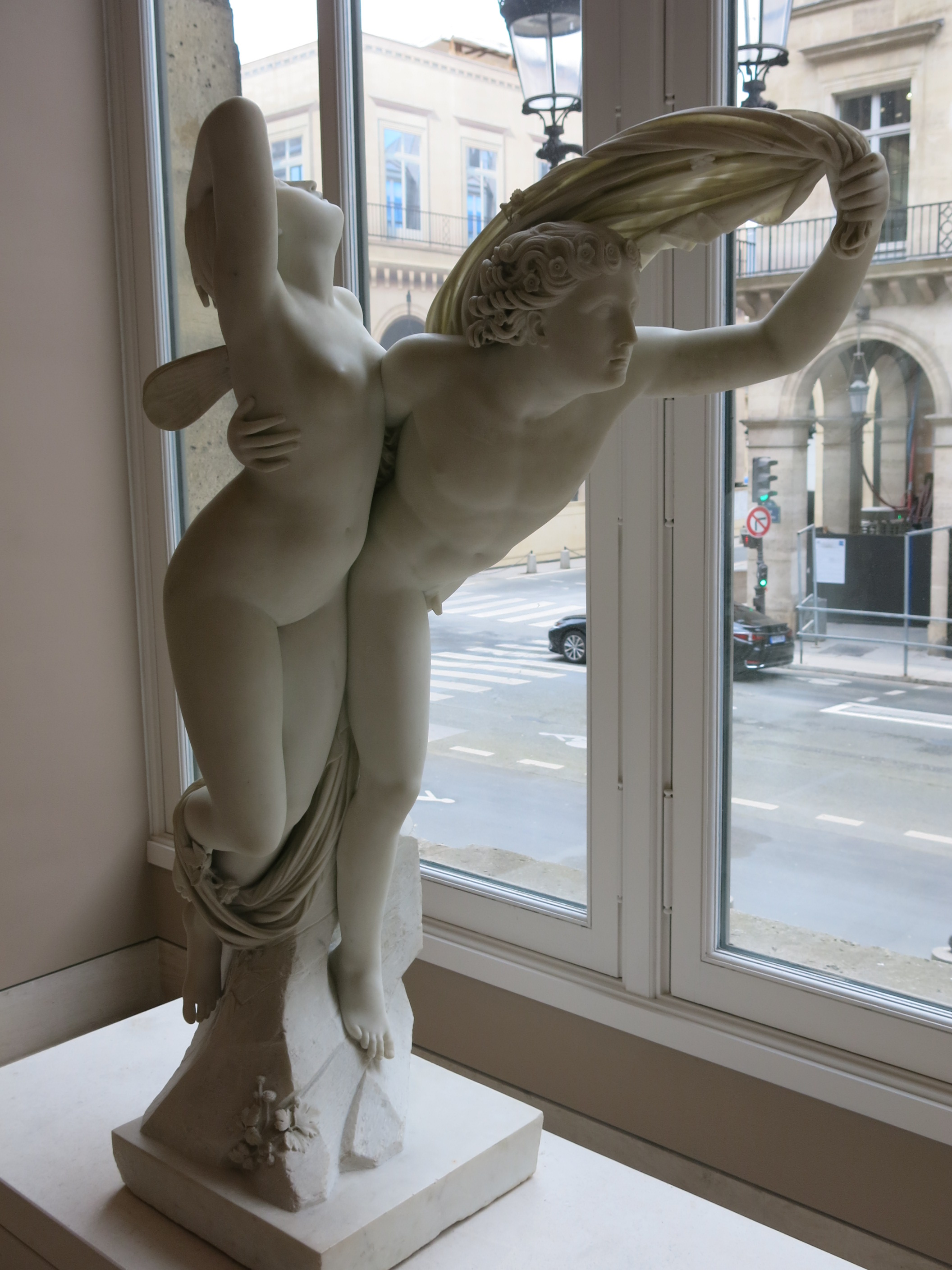
Zephyr Carrying off Psyche by Henri-Joseph Ruxthiel

== See also ==
- Royal Academy Exhibition of 1814, held at Somerset House in London

== Bibliography ==
- Crow, Thomas. Restoration: The Fall of Napoleon in the Course of European Art, 1812–1820. Princeton University Press, 2023.
- Harkett, Daniel & Hornstein, Katie (ed.) Horace Vernet and the Thresholds of Nineteenth-Century Visual Culture. Dartmouth College Press, 2017.
- Lilti, Antoine. The World of the Salons: Sociability and Worldliness in Eighteenth-century Paris. Oxford University Press, 2015.
- Noon, Patrick & Bann, Stephen. Constable to Delacroix: British Art and the French Romantics. Tate, 2003.
- Sérullaz, Arlette. French Painting: The Revolutionary Decades, 1760–1830. Australian Gallery Directors Council, 1980.

== See also ==
- Category:Artworks exhibited at the Salon of 1814
