= Raphael and La Fornarina =

Painting by Jean-Auguste-Dominique Ingres

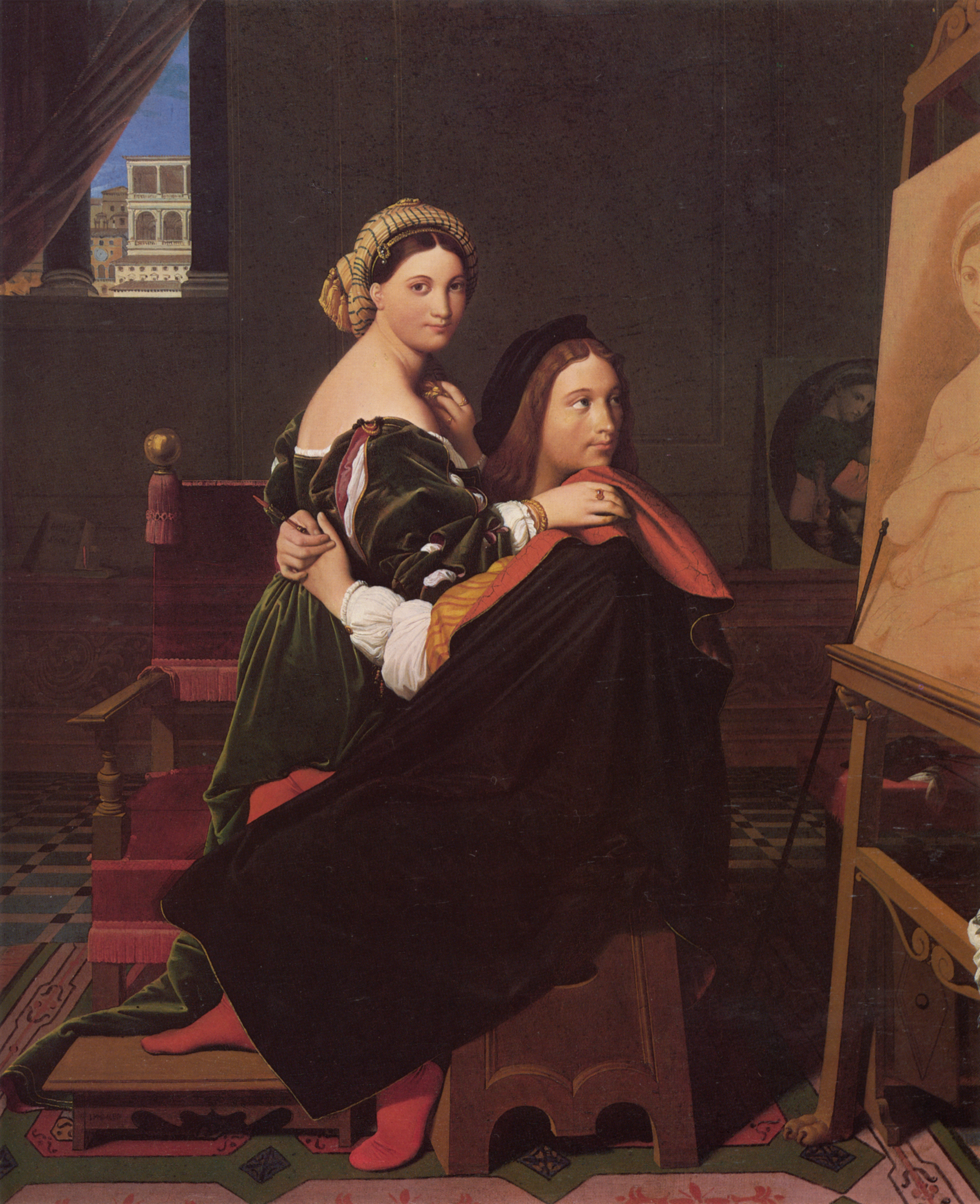
- Artist: Jean-Auguste-Dominique Ingres
- Year: 1813
- Medium: Oil on canvas
- Dimensions: 63.8 cm × 53.3 cm (25 1/2 in × 21 in)
- Location: Fogg Museum

Raphael and La Fornarina is an oil painting on canvas executed in 1813, in Italy, by Jean-Auguste-Dominique Ingres. It is the first of five versions of the painting he produced between 1813 and his death in 1867. In 1814 his first version was exhibited at the Salon of that year. The work shows the renowned painter, Raphael, sitting in his studio with his mistress, La Fornarina (the baker), on his knee. His embrace reflects his affection and desire for her, while his gaze towards his own artwork, his portrait of his mistress, indicates his love for art. This contrast represents the painter's major conflict between who he loves and what he loves. The mistress makes eye contact with the viewer and her posture, specifically her arms resting on his shoulders, shows how proud and satisfied she is with being his mistress and inspiration. The Fornarina's sensual gaze at the viewer claims her importance and place both within the artist's studio and profession.

Although Ingres thoroughly researched the Renaissance artist's life through biographies by Giorgio Vasari and Angelo Comolli, and planned to create a series of paintings based on his life, in the end he only produced two scenes: Raphael and La Fornarina (and its succeeding versions) and the Betrothal of Raphael. The depiction of the Fornarina resembles not only the Virgin Mary in the painting in the background of the Madonna della seggiola, but also Ingres's depiction of the promiscuous Grande Odalisque. The parallel highlights a connection between Raphael and Ingres as they both paint what they desire.

== Background ==
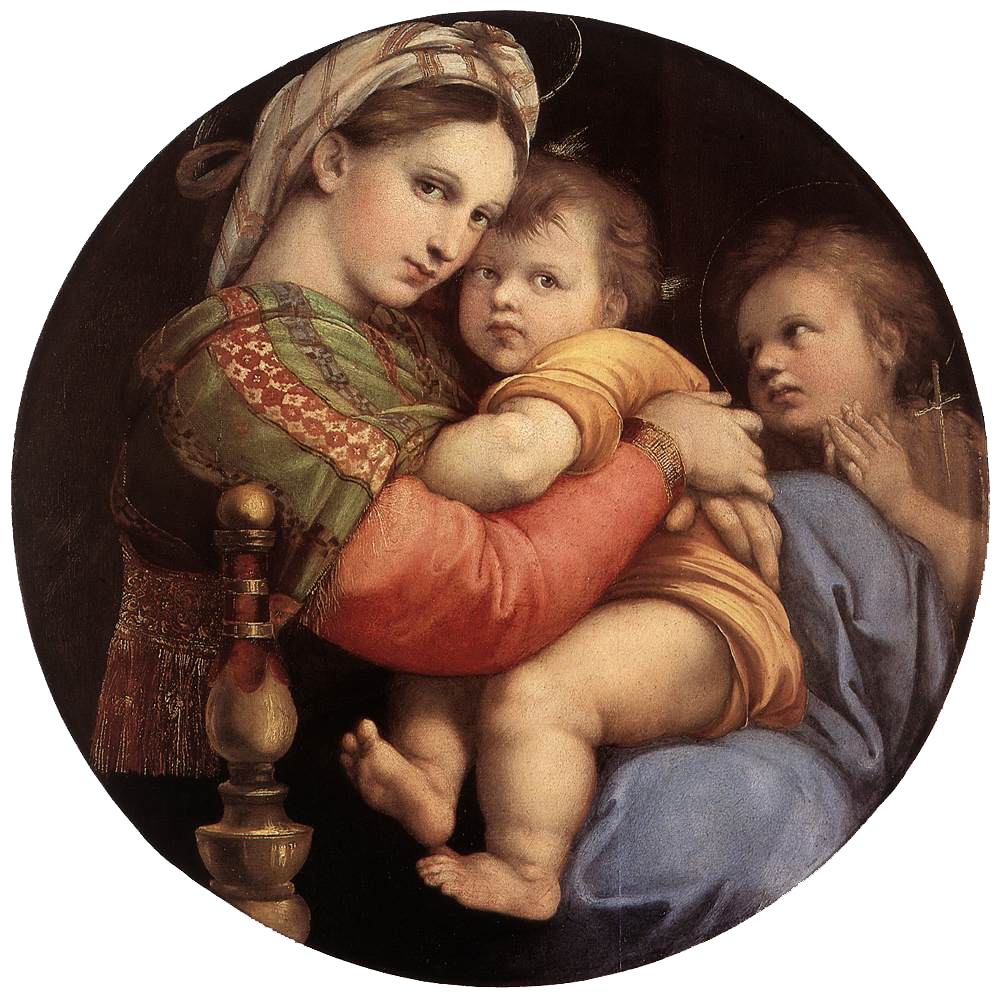
Madonna della Seggiola, Raphael, 1513–1514

Towards the end of the eighteenth century, paintings depicting and glorifying the lives of prominent and famous artists became popular among the bourgeoisie and were exhibited at the Salon (Paris). This painting is an example of the Troubadour style as its subject is a great Renaissance figure and illustrates a detailed and intimate Renaissance studio scene, by incorporating columns, colored tiles, furniture (such as the easel, armchair, and stool), and by creating a linear grid. Besides the increased interest in Renaissance masters during the early nineteenth century, Ingres became curious about Raphael's artworks and life after seeing a replica of the Madonna della seggiola in his teacher's Toulousian art studio. At the beginning of the nineteenth century, Ingres was awarded the Prix de Rome, which provided him with the opportunity to study in Italy. While in Italy, Ingres sent work to be exhibited in Paris, including Raphael and La Fornarina.

== Description and compositional analysis ==
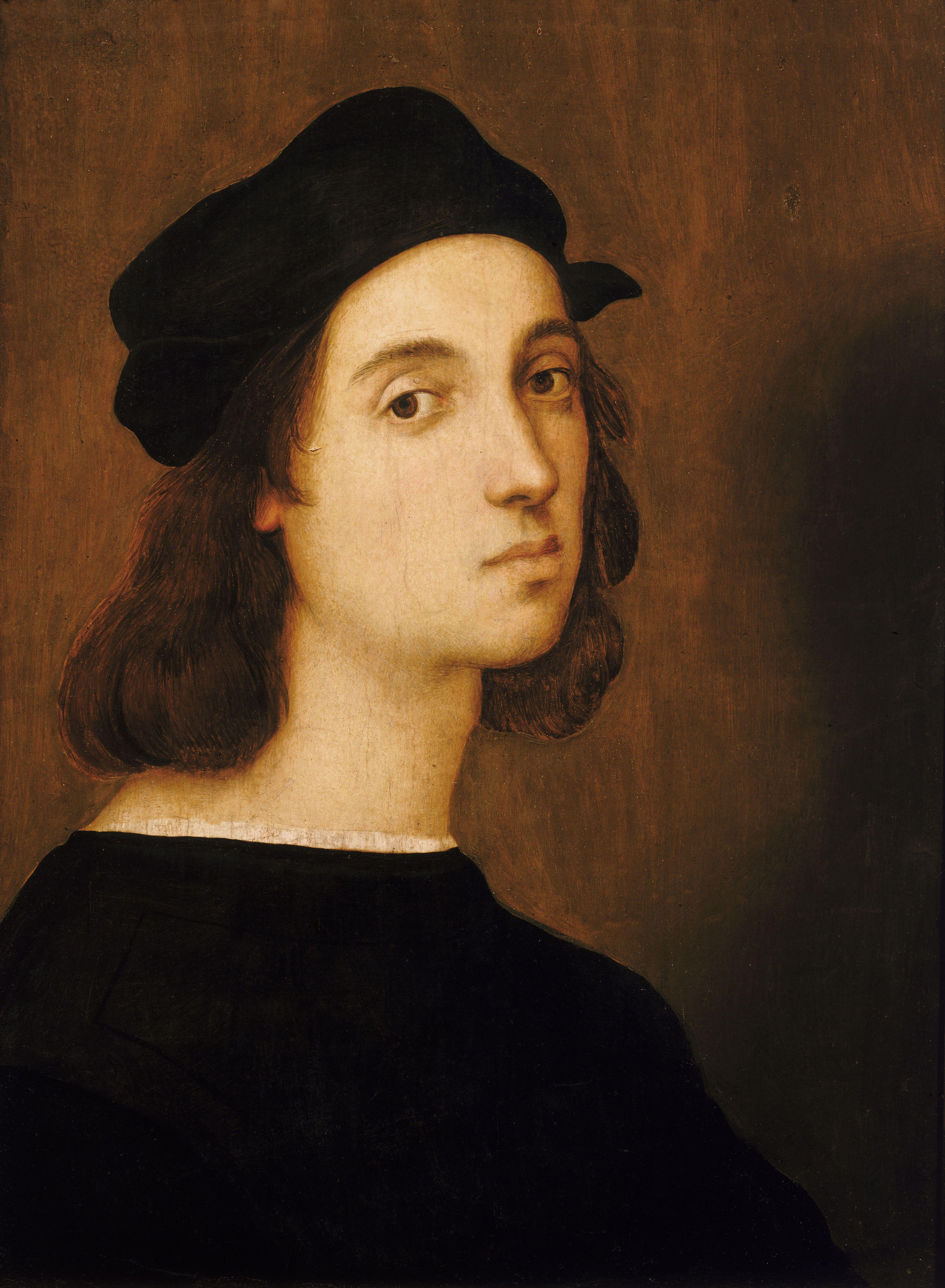
Self-portrait, Raphael, c. 1506

La Fornarina, Raphael, 1518–1519

The painting shows Raphael and his mistress, the Fornarina in his art studio. Her pose is dynamic, energetic, graceful, and alive as she is both hugging the artist, yet also pulling away and distancing herself. The critic and art historian Rosalind E. Krauss interprets the Fornarina's seductive gaze as indicating that she is embraced only after she has seen, appreciated, and admired his work. The Fornarina has a symmetric face, is wearing a turban scarf on her head, is dressed in a green velvet gown, and is adorned in gold jewellery. The turban is a typical hairstyle found in high Italian Renaissance artworks. Her bare skin, naked shoulders, and draping dress underscore the desirability of her body. Ingres uses Raphael's La Fornarina as his model for the mistress. In the background there is a view of the Vatican, specifically showing the Cortile di San Damasco, where Raphael had painted his famous frescos, and which places the artist in the heart of Rome. In the scene, another one of his paintings, Madonna della seggiola appears in the background. Ingres used Raphael's own self-portrait, located in the Uffizi, as his model for the painter. Ingres focused on details in creating the work. The contrast between the living, breathing Fornarina as opposed to the idealized Fornarina on the canvas, on the easel, is central to this painting. The Fornarina is physically present in Raphael's life, but she is also alive in his portrait, living in the painter's imagination. The perfect resemblance of the portrait of the Fornarina demonstrates both Ingres's and Raphael's artistic talent.

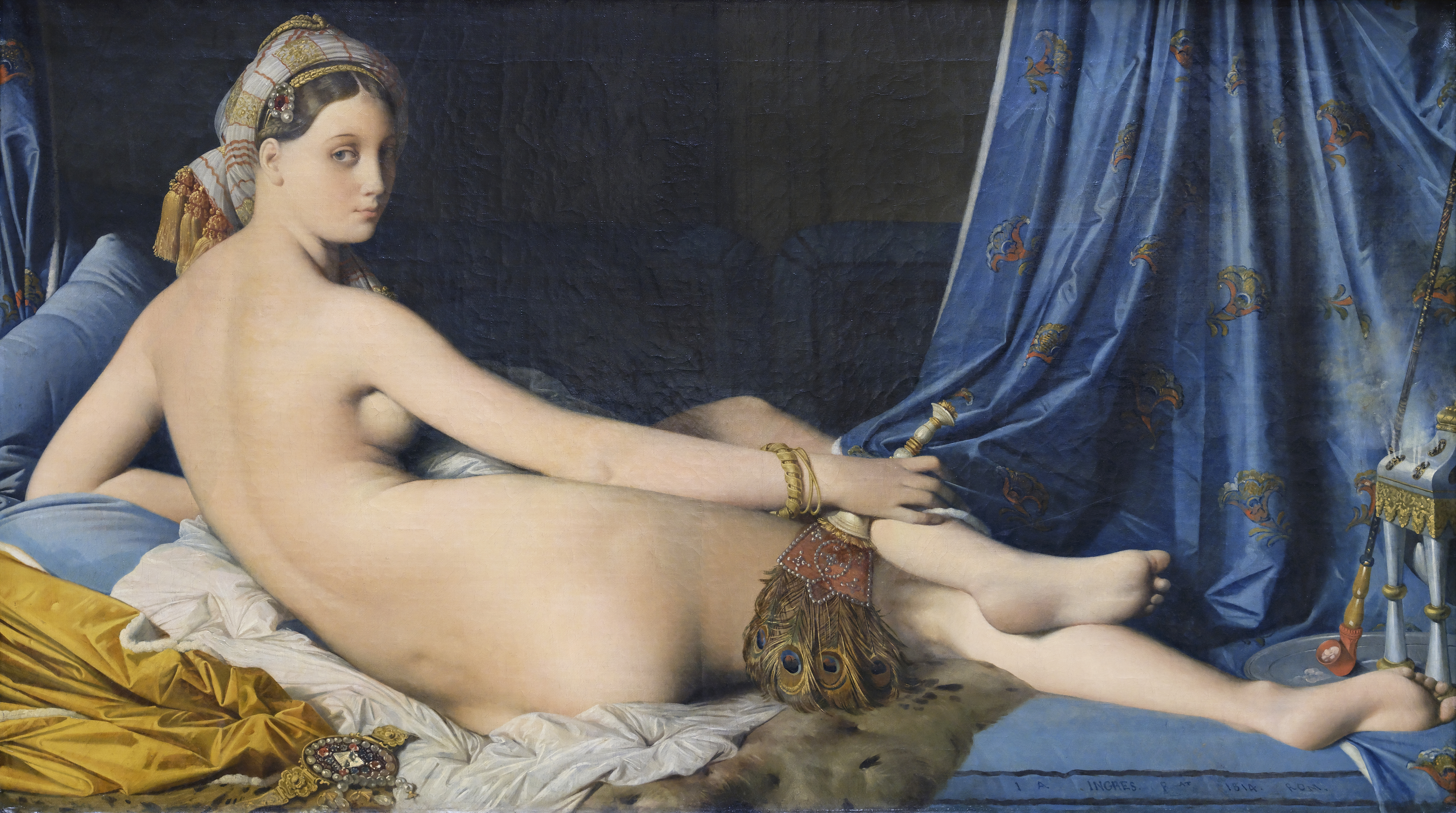
Grande Odalisque, Ingres, 1814

On the one hand, the Fornarina's facial features and garments in both depictions resemble those of the Madonna della seggiola which makes the mistress appear saintlike. In the depiction of the Madonna della seggiola, appearing in the background, Ingres intentionally cuts off the image of the Son to emphasize the likeness between the Madonna and the Fornarina. In Raphael's Madonna della seggiola, St. John is present on the right hand side, while in Ingres's version, he is not visible. The resemblance in features and pose, specifically the embrace between the Fornarina and Raphael, is similar to that of the Virgin Mary holding her son. On the other hand, there is also a strong likeness between the illustration of the mistress and Ingres's painting of the Grande Odalisque. The art historian Wendy Leeks observes that "in these works the Virgin and the odalisque are not merely sisters, they are one ... These images seem to amalgamate two different kinds of emotional response – sexual desire of male for female and reverential love of son for mother."

Raphael embraces his mistress, but instead of looking at her, his face is turned away from her, his desire, and is observing and admiring his own work. Raphael is faced with the decision of having to choose between his love for his mistress and his vocation. She is a distraction and will lead to his downfall, yet she and his art are interconnected because she represents beauty and beauty is what inspires him and his artwork.

== Sources ==
The painting and its future versions were based on the biographies about Raphael's life: Vita by Giorgio Vasari, a 16th-century Italian painter and writer, and Vita di Raffaello da Urbino by Angelo Comolli. Vasari makes multiple references to a mistress, yet it is unclear if he is referring to the same woman or multiple lovers. Although the mistress's identity remained uncertain, by the eighteenth century she was named and identified as the Fornarina, a small baker, and by the nineteenth century she was identified as Margarita Luti, the daughter of a Sienese baker.

Bavaria, a close friend of Raphael, stated that Raphael had painted a breathtaking portrait of his beloved mistress, La Fornarina, which he describes as: "no less than alive." In addition, Vasari also discusses Raphael's sexual appetite by telling the story of how Agostino Chigi, a dear friend, incentivized Raphael to finish painting a grand room in his Villa Farnesina by having his mistress moved into the painter's quarters. Lastly, "Vasari reports that 'Raphael was amorous and fond of women, and was continually pressed into their service.'"

According to Vasari and other writers, the beautiful Fornarina represents Raphael's demise, luring him to his death. Vasari stated that: "Raphael died of exhaustion from lovemaking," while other biographers went as far as blaming his mistress for his death. In his 1790 biography of Raphael, the Abbé Angelo Comolli wrote:

Poor Raphael ... desperately pursuing a ruinous passion ... His passion for beautiful women was ever alive and became his downfall. Indeed, I would almost call it his rage for women had not Raphael often declared that he was not transported by women as such, but by beautiful ones, since it was from their beautiful faces that he derived the beauty of his art; but the end proved otherwise, and his days ended all too soon from his having succumbed too much to his passion. Oh the humiliation of it! Raphael of Urbino, the foremost painter of the universe, the fairest genius in the flower of his years, behold him brought low by a woman, and such a woman!

Nineteenth-century biographers, such as Balzac, shaped their accounts of the mistress around their moral views, specifically that of the strict madonna-whore binary.

== Ingres and Raphael ==
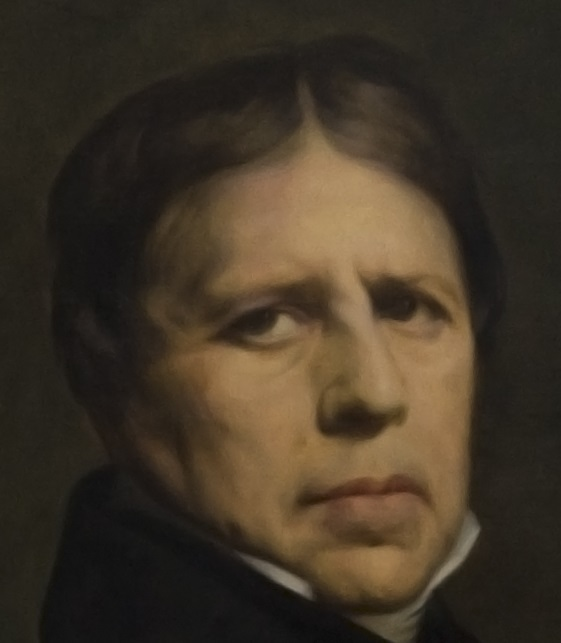
Self Portrait at the Age of 78, Ingres, 1858

In 1813, at the time of the painting, Ingres married Madeleine Chapelle, which may have led him to focus on Raphael's relationships with women. In Le Roman d'amour de M. Inges, by Henry Lapauze, Ingres's and Raphael's relationships and encounters with women are contrasted and analyzed. Raphael was engaged to Cardinal Medici Bibbiena's niece, but was considered an adulterer as he was having sex with a commoner. Ingres had only three romantic relationships and although he was known to be surrounded by women, he was not a debauchee, but reputed to be chivalrous gentleman. In a letter to a woman, Ingres wrote: "I will live and die the servant of women." Raphael was 37 when he is said to have died of debauchery, the Fornarina supposedly his fatal vice. As Marie Lathers has written, this vision of Raphael's death was reinforced by Balzac: "When Balzac rewrote Raphael's d'Urbino story, he had his protagonist die in a lustful embrace, his death rattle obscuring the words of desire that his larynx would produce." Depictions of La Fornarina were often credited to Giulio Romano, Raphael's student, in order to disassociate Raphael from dishonorable artworks, such as paintings of his mistress. By contrast, Ingres died at the age of 86 from a bilateral pneumonia, supposedly after being exposed to cold wind in efforts to help his wife. These differences shape perceptions of the relation between the painters and their desires.

== Versions ==
Ingres painted four additional versions in 1825, 1830, 1840, and 1860. Ingres explained his reason for once again repeating the subject in 1860: "I am taking up again the picture of Raphael and La Fornarina, my last edition of this subject, which will, I hope, cause the others to be forgotten." This final version remained unfinished at his death in 1867. Ingres also produced one signed drawing of the subject. Rosalind Krauss disputes the theory that Ingres created various versions of his artwork for 'the pursuit of perfection', but says that:

Through this movement of repeatability its 'perfection' has been breeched in advance. Because – and this was precisely Ingres' practice if not his 'intention' – each repetition is always a recontextualization of the model – a change in scale, medium, site. Each repetition thus as well involves a change in meaning. This is a change to which the model itself has always, and in advance, been open. The model's 'truth', its absolute ness, its indivisible self-presence, has never, theoretically, been possible.

== See also ==
- List of paintings by Jean-Auguste-Dominique Ingres

== Bibliography ==
- Abraham, Jennifer (2005). "Frederic Leighton's 'Cimabue's Celebrated Madonna': A study in 19th-century representations of the Renaissance". The British Art Journal. 6 (3): 59–71. JSTOR 41614648.
- Betzer, Sarah (December 2015). "Artist as Lover: Rereading Ingres's Raphael and the Fornarina". Oxford Art Journal. 38 (3): 313–341. doi:10.1093/oxartj/kcv020.
- Brand, Peg Zeglin (2015). "The Role of Luck in Originality and Creativity". The Journal of Aesthetics and Art Criticism. 73 (1): 31–55. doi:10.1111/jaac.12136. JSTOR 43283315.
- Chu, Petra ten-Doesschate (2012). Nineteenth-century European Art. Pearson Prentice Hall. ISBN 978-0-205-70799-7.
- Ingres, Jean-Auguste-Dominique; Rosenblum, Robert (1967). Ingres. Harry N. Abrams. OCLC 610393942.
- Fend, Mechthild (2017). "Hermetic Borderline". Fleshing out surfaces: Skin in French art and medicine, 1650–1850. Manchester University Press. pp. 237–273. ISBN 978-1-5261-0467-0. JSTOR j.ctvnb7m8d.1.
- Krauss, Rosalind E. (1989). "You Irreplaceable You". Studies in the History of Art. 20: 151–159. JSTOR 42620163.
- Lathers, Marie (1998). "'Tué par un excès d'amour': Raphael, Balzac, Ingres". The French Review. 71 (4): 550–564. JSTOR 398850.
- Leeks, Wendy (1986). "Ingres Other-Wise". Oxford Art Journal. 9 (1): 29–37. doi:10.1093/oxartj/9.1.29. JSTOR 1360370.
- McVaugh, Robert E. (1987). "Turner and Rome, Raphael and the Fornarina". Studies in Romanticism. 26 (3): 365–398. doi:10.2307/25600666. JSTOR 25600666.
- Shiff, Richard (1984). "Representation, Copying, and the Technique of Originality". New Literary History. 15 (2): 333–363. doi:10.2307/468860. JSTOR 468860.
- Steinberg, Leo (1972). "A Working Equation Or—Picasso in the Homestretch". The Print Collector's Newsletter. 3 (5): 102–105. JSTOR 44129471.
