= Portrait of Louis XVIII =

Painting by François Gérard

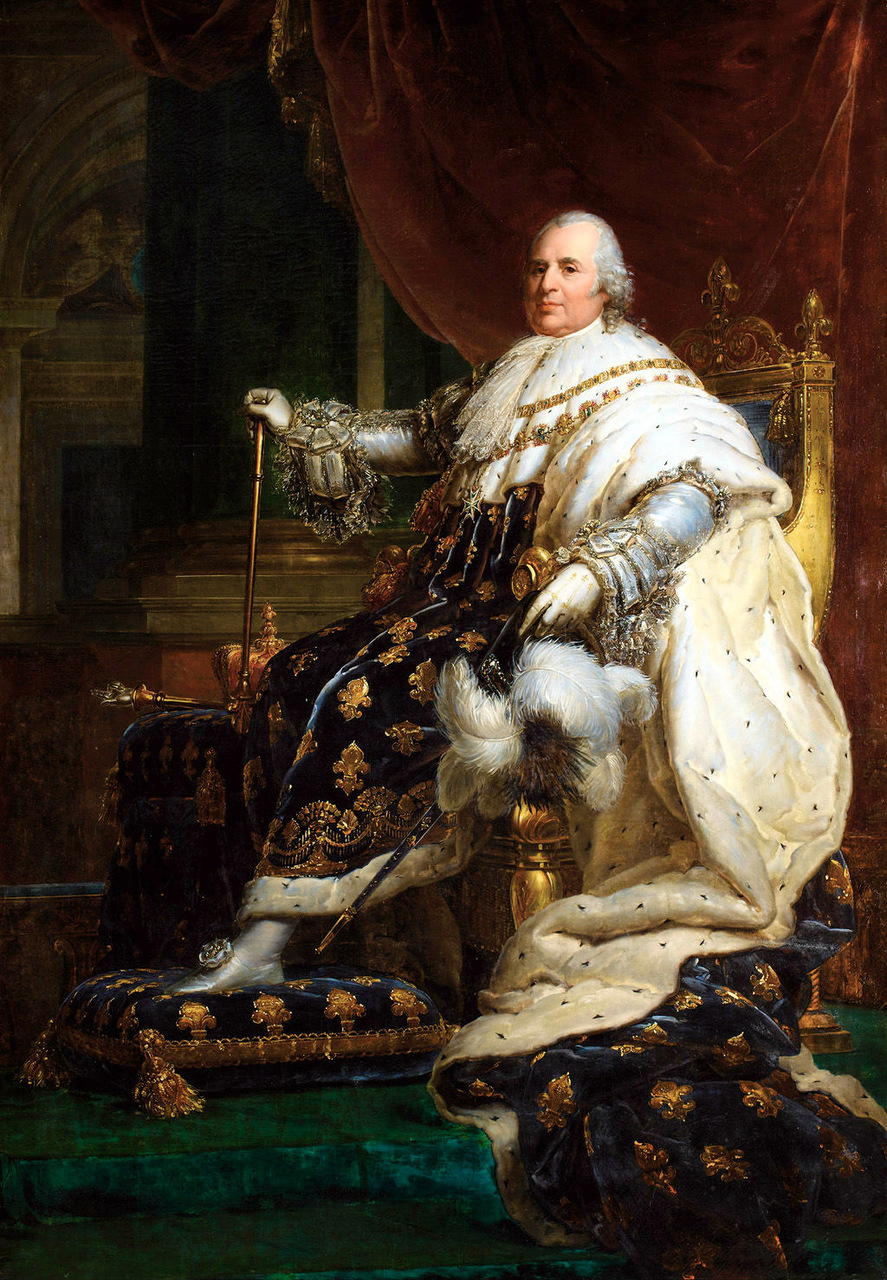
- Artist: François Gérard
- Year: 1814
- Type: Oil on canvas, portrait painting
- Dimensions: 32.7 cm × 23 cm (12.9 in × 9.1 in)
- Location: Hôtel Beauharnais, Paris

Portrait of Louis XVIII is an 1814 portrait painting by the French artist François Gérard depicting Louis XVIII of France in his coronation robes.

Louis XVIII was the younger brother of Louis XVI, who had been guillotined during the French Revolution; he spent many years in exile and returned to France from England following the 1814 downfall of Napoleon and the First Restoration. Gérard rushed to complete the painting for the Salon of 1814 in Paris, the first of the restored monarchy. The seated position was unusual and Gérard aimed for a greater degree of naturalism. Gérard's contemporaries Antoine-Jean Gros and Robert Lefèvre both also depicted the king in his robes. In the event Louis XVIII never had a coronation ceremony, and the first and last of the Bourbon restoration was that of his brother Charles X, in 1825. which Gérard notably painted as The Coronation of Charles X.

Several versions of the painting exist, with the original in the Hôtel Beauharnais. A sketch for it is now in the collection of the Palace of Versailles.

== See also ==
- Portrait of Charles X, 1825 portrait by Thomas Lawrence

== Bibliography ==
- Porterfield, Todd & Siegfried, Susan L. Staging Empire: Napoleon, Ingres, and David. ISBN 0271028580. Pennsylvania State University, 2006.
- Price, Munro. The Perilous Crown: France Between Revolutions, 1814-1848. ISBN 1405040823. Pan Macmillan, 2010.
- Sérullaz, Arlette. French Painting: The Revolutionary Decades, 1760-1830. ISBN 9780642899699. Australian Gallery Directors Council, 1980.
