= The Tombs of the Old Heroes =

Painting by Caspar David Friedrich

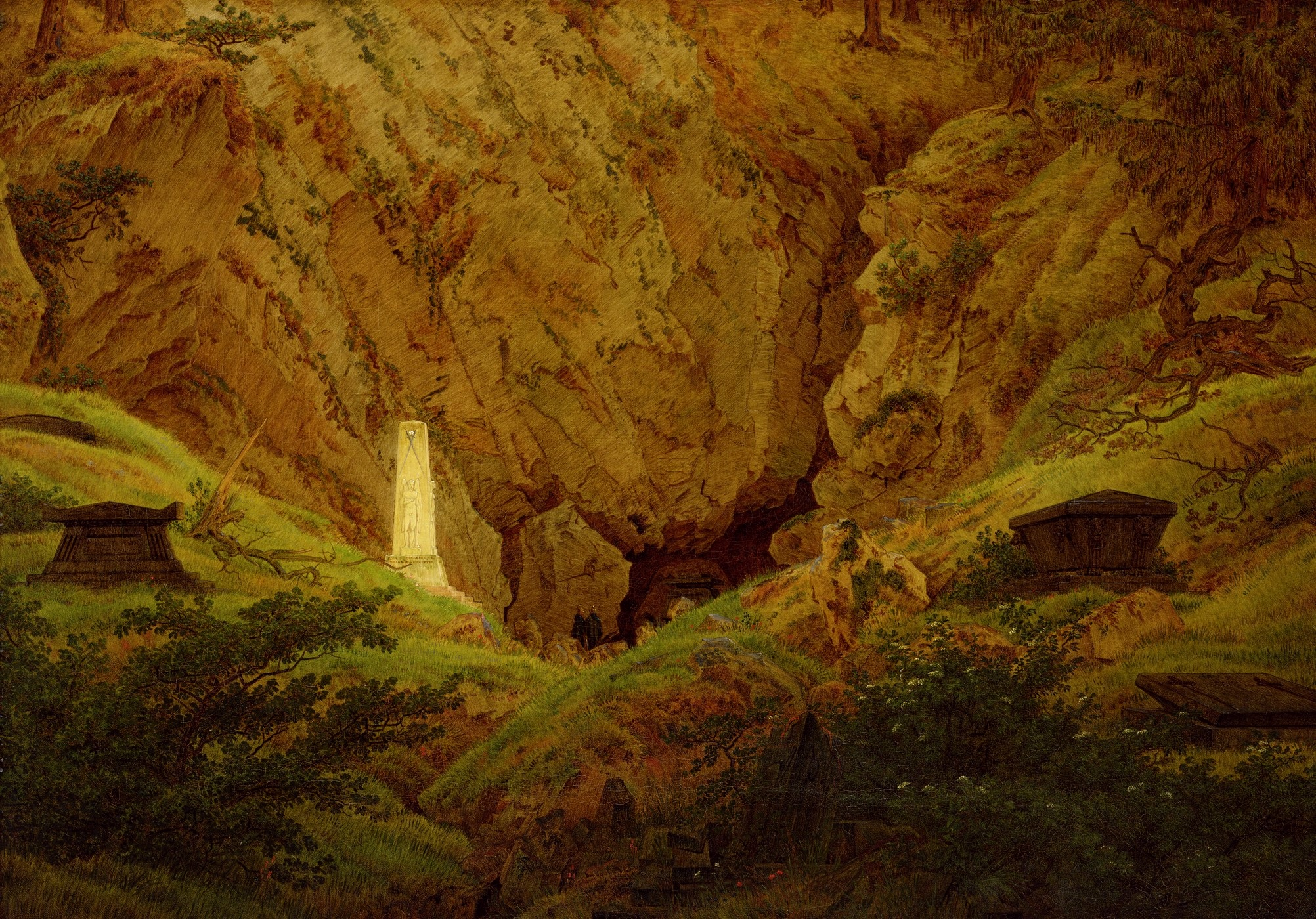
- Artist: Caspar David Friedrich
- Year: 1812
- Medium: oil on canvas
- Dimensions: 49.5 cm × 70.5 cm (19.5 in × 27.8 in)
- Location: Hamburger Kunsthalle, Hamburg

The Tombs of the Old Heroes (German: Grabmale alter Helden) is an oil-on-canvas painting by the German Romantic artist Caspar David Friedrich, painted between April and August 1812. It is also known as The Graves of the Fallen Freedom Fighters (German: Gräber gefallener Freiheitskrieger) or Arminius's Grave (German: Grab des Arminius) and is now in the Hamburger Kunsthalle.

As its alternative titles suggest, it was produced during an era of renewed interest in Arminius and his struggle against the Romans, an era which also produced the Hermannsdenkmal.

It was exhibited in March 1814 at the Exhibition of Patriotic Art in Dresden, alongside two other Friedrich paintings: Cave and Tomb, which is a variant of the same subject, and The Chasseur in the Woods.

== See also ==
- List of works by Caspar David Friedrich
