= The Chasseur in the Woods =

1814 painting by Caspar David Friedrich

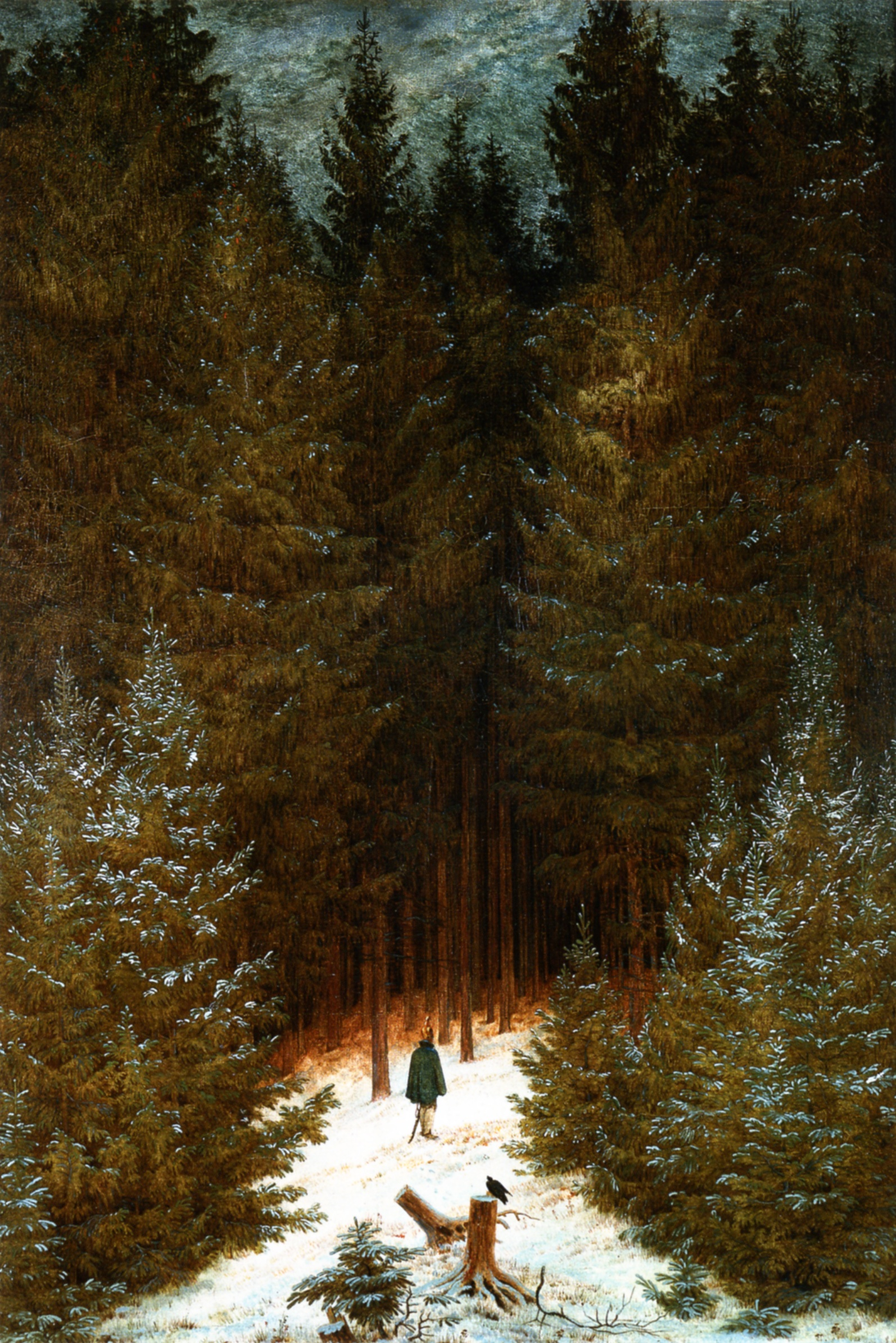
- Artist: Caspar David Friedrich
- Year: 1814
- Type: oil on canvas
- Dimensions: 65.7 cm × 46.7 cm (25.9 in × 18.4 in)
- Location: private collection

The Chasseur in the Woods (German: Der Chasseur im Walde) is an 1814 painting by the German Caspar David Friedrich.

== Description and history ==
The Chasseur in the Woods depicts a lone chasseur, which is a member of the French cavalry, in a clearing in an evergreen forest in winter. Friedrich began to work on it in the summer of 1813, while Dresden was occupied by French troops. Is is painted in oil on canvas. It was first exhibited in March 1814 at the Exhibition of Patriotic Art in Dresden, which celebrated the city's liberation, alongside two other Friedrich paintings: The Tombs of the Old Heroes and Cave and Tomb. At the exhibition, a note said that the chasseur listens as a raven on a tree stump sings the man's funeral dirge. The Chasseur in the Woods was bought by Malte of Putbus. His catalogue contains a similar note: "It is a winter landscape; the rider, whose horse has already been lost, is hastening into the arms of death; a raven is crowing a funeral dirge for him."

== Reception ==
In 1814, the Vossische Zeitung interpreted The Chasseur in the Woods as a comment to the Napoleonic Wars, depicting a French soldier among dense rows of German patriots represented by the trees. This interpretation has remained the dominant. The art historian Norbert Wolf writes that contemporaries must have associated the wintery landscape with the defeat of Napoleon's army in Russia. He describes The Chasseur in the Woods as Friedrich's "clearest political work", and suggests the tall fir trees represent German patriots, and the small pines in the foreground represent the post-war generation. Arts Digest wrote in 1987 that Friedrich made use of the sense of doom that exists in many of his landscape paintings and directed it against an aggressor. In 2003, James J. Sheehan compared The Chasseur in the Woods to The Wounded Cuirassier by Théodore Géricault and The Third of May 1808 by Francisco Goya. All three paintings were exhibited for the first time in 1814 and depict the Napoleonic Wars, each from its own perspective. Sheenan stressed their differences but attributed these to the characters of the painters rather than national character. The philosopher Leon Miodoński connects the picture to the Romantic motif of forest solitude (German: Waldeinsamkeit), a term introduced by Ludwig Tieck in the story "The Fair Eckbert".

== See also ==
- List of works by Caspar David Friedrich
- Battle of Dresden
- German Forest
- Winter landscapes in Western art
