= Pope Pius VII in the Sistine Chapel =

Painting by Jean-Auguste-Dominique Ingres

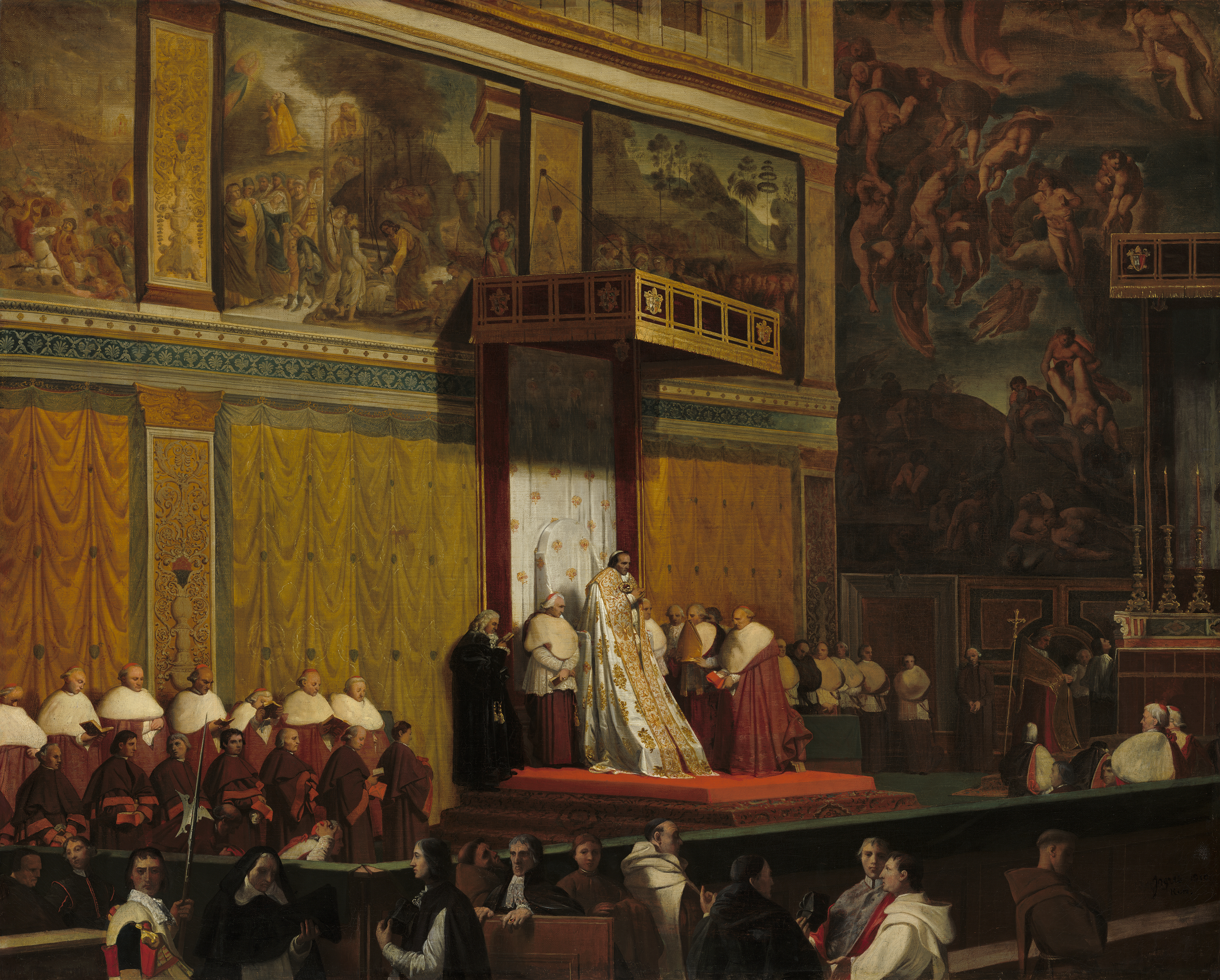
- Artist: Jean-Auguste-Dominique Ingres
- Year: 1814
- Type: Oil on canvas, history painting
- Dimensions: 74.5 cm × 92.7 cm (29.3 in × 36.5 in)
- Location: National Gallery of Art, Washington D.C.

Pope Pius VII in the Sistine Chapel is an 1814 oil painting by the French artist Jean-Auguste-Dominique Ingres. It depicts the Pope Pius VII conducting Mass in Sistine Chapel in Rome. Pius had previously been kidnapped and detained in France by Napoleon, so Ingres emphasises his restored authority. It was commissioned by Charles Marie Jean Baptiste Marcotte, a friend and patron of Ingres.

It was exhibited at the Salon of 1814 in Paris, the first to be held following the Bourbon restoration. Today it is in the collection of the National Gallery of Art in Washington, having been acquired in 1952.

== See also ==
- List of paintings by Jean-Auguste-Dominique Ingres

== Bibliography ==
- Caiani, Ambrogio A. To Kidnap a Pope: Napoleon and Pius VII. Yale University Press, 2021.
- Crow, Thomas. Restoration: The Fall of Napoleon in the Course of European Art, 1812-1820. Princeton University Press, 2023.
- Eitner, Lorenz. 19th Century European Painting: David To Cezanne. Avalon Publishing, 2002.
