= The Charging Chasseur =

Painting by Théodore Géricault

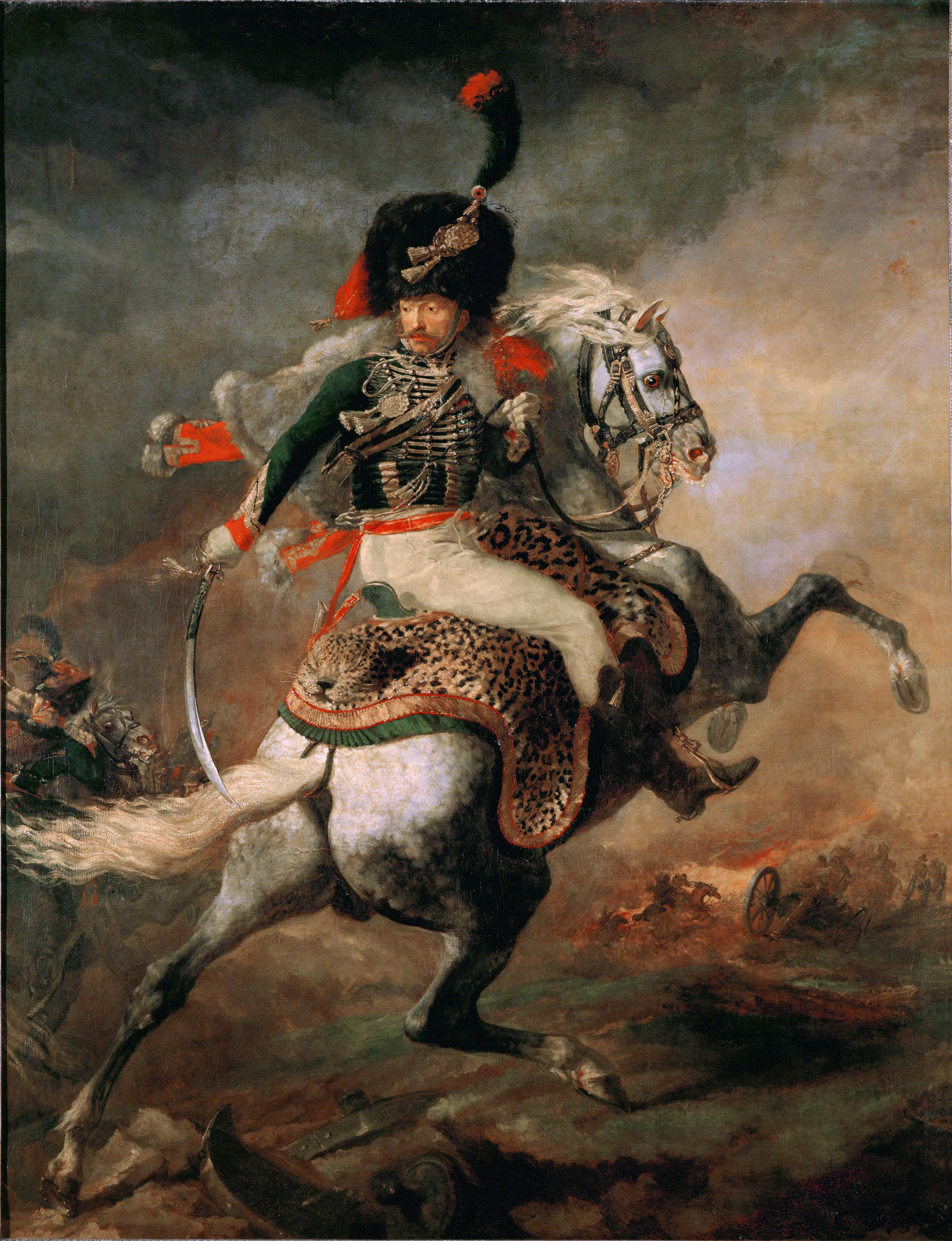
- Artist: Théodore Géricault
- Year: circa 1812
- Medium: Oil on canvas
- Dimensions: 349 cm × 266 cm (137 in × 105 in)
- Location: Musée du Louvre, Paris

The Charging Chasseur, or An Officer of the Imperial Horse Guards Charging, is a c. 1812 oil-on-canvas painting by the French painter Théodore Géricault. Depicting an officer of the Mounted Chasseurs of the Imperial Guard ready to attack, the painting was placed on display at both the Salon of 1812 and Salon of 1814. It is now on display at the Louvre in Paris.

== History and description ==
The painting was Géricault's first exhibited work and it is an example of his attempt to condense both movement and structure in his art. It represents French romanticism and has a motif similar to Jacques-Louis David's Napoleon Crossing the Alps, but non-classical characteristics of the picture include its dramatic diagonal arrangement and vigorous paint handling.

In The Charging Chasseur, the horse appears to be rearing away from an unseen attacker. The turning figure on a rearing horse is derived from the large early Rubens Saint George (Museo del Prado, 1605–1607), though there the view is from the side. Géricault would continue to move away from classicism, as exemplified in his later masterpiece The Raft of the Medusa (1818–19).

== Cultural references ==
The American artist Kehinde Wiley reimagined The Charging Chasseur in his 2007 painting Officer of the Hussars. In Officer of the Hussars, a young Black man dressed in a sleeveless shirt, jeans, and Timberland boots sits atop the horse.

== Sources ==
- Chu, Petra ten-Doesschate. Nineteenth Century European Art. Prentice Hall: Upper Saddle River, NJ: 2006.
