= Léon Matthieu Cochereau =

French painter (1793–1817)

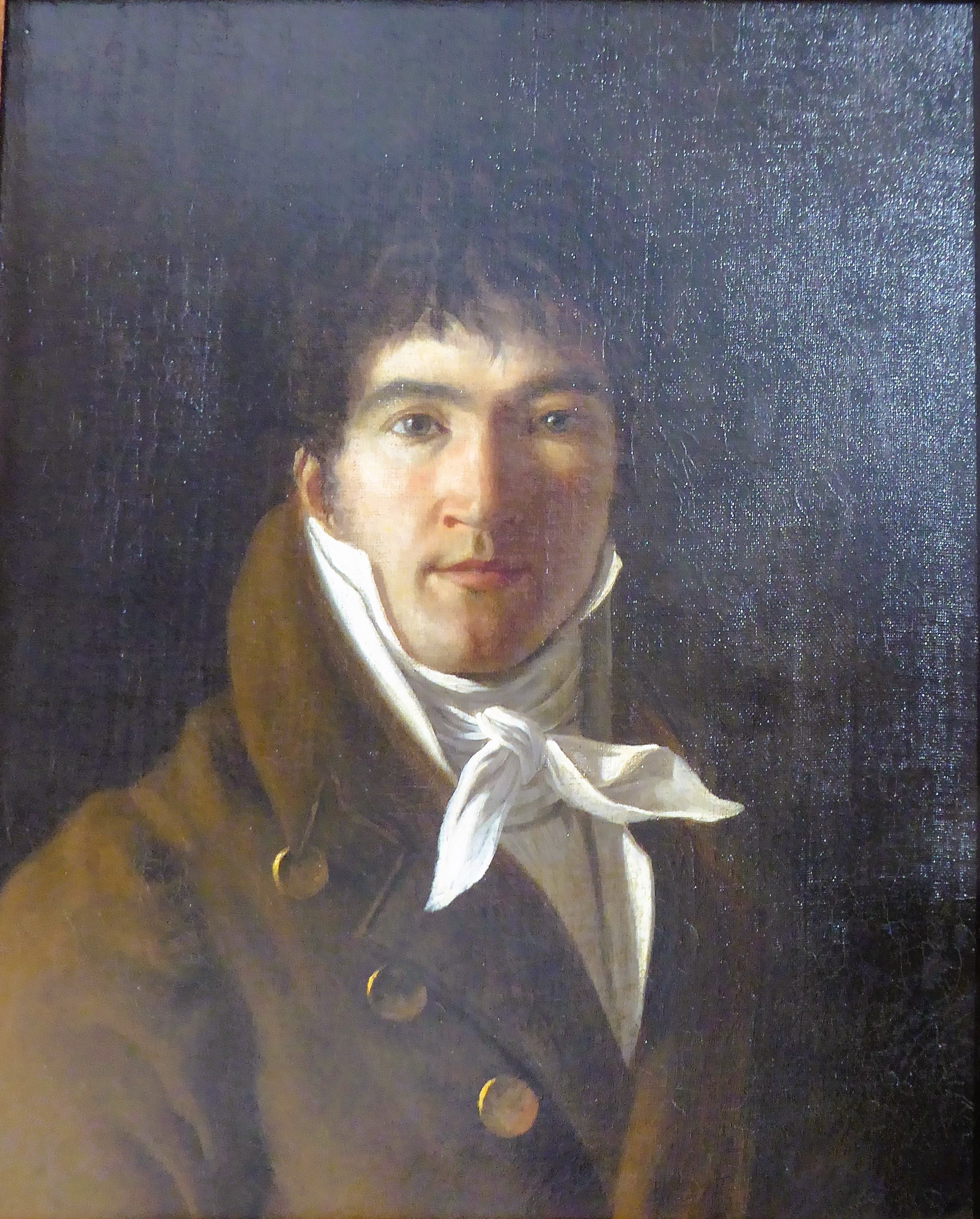
- Selfportrait in Châteaudun museum
- Born: 9 February 1793; Montigny-le-Gannelon
- Died: 30 August 1817 (aged 24); Ionian Sea
- Resting place: Montigny-le-Gannelon
- Occupation: Painter

Léon Matthieu Cochereau (1793, Montigny-le-Gannelon - 30 August 1817) was a French painter.

== Biography ==
Student of David, he painted his master's studio in a painting now held at the Louvre. Another of his works is held at the Musée Antoine Vivenel. Several of his paintings are also in Chartres and Châteaudun museums, both in Eure-et-Loir department.

He died at sea of dysentery whilst going to Greece accompanied by his uncle Pierre Prévost, the panorama painter - the precise site of death was, according to the sources, "across from Bizerte, in sight of Athens, near the Isle of Cerigo, in the Ionian Sea.

== Gallery ==
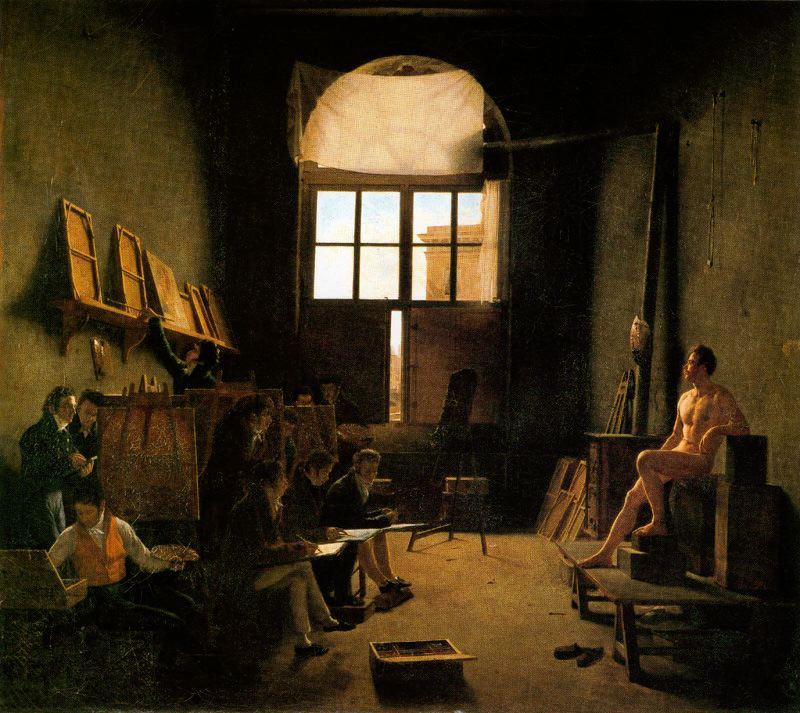
Léon Matthieu Cochereau, Studio of Jacques-Louis David, oil on canvas. 90 x 105 cm. Louvre, Paris, France

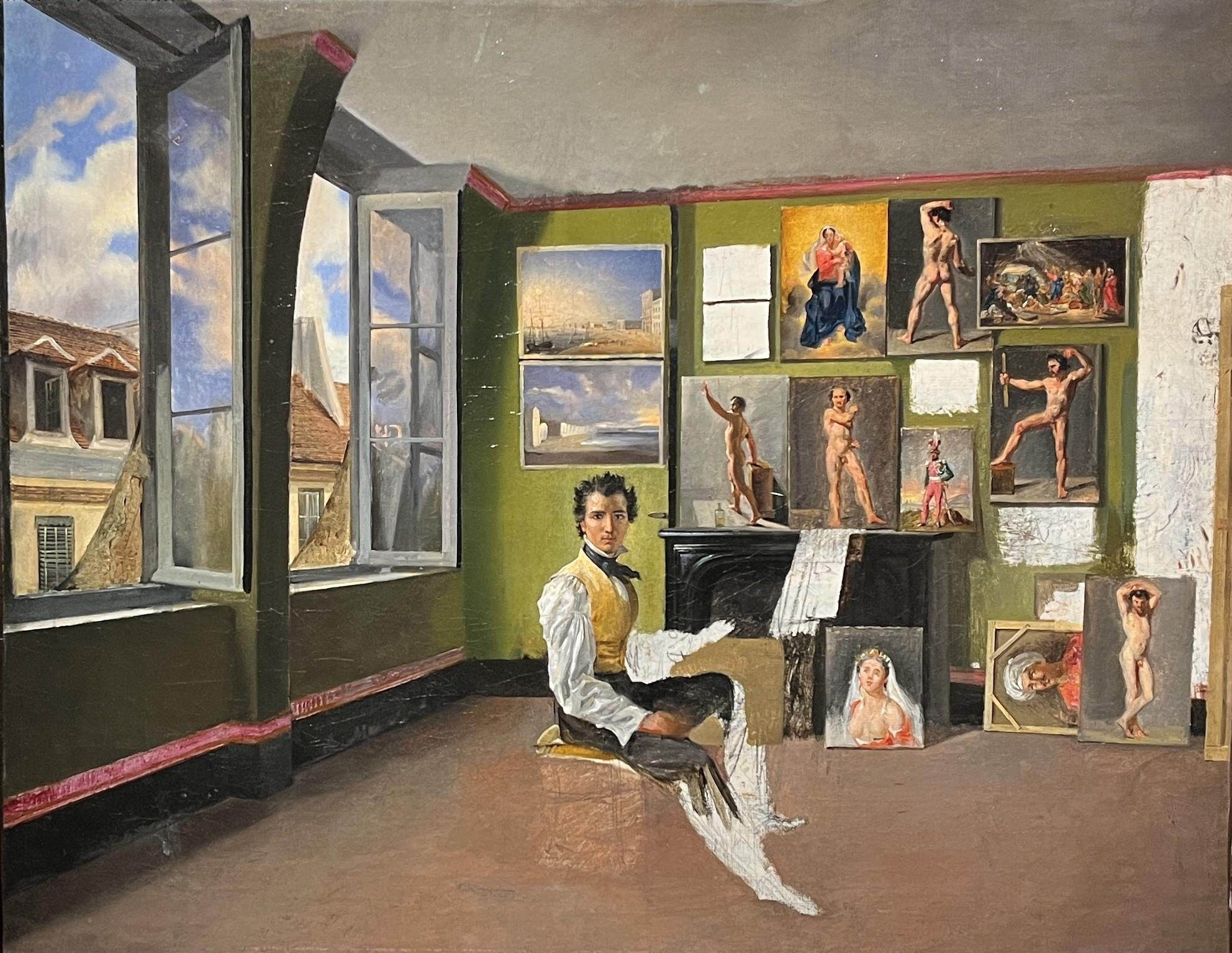
Self-portrait in the studio (unfinished), private collection, circa 1817.

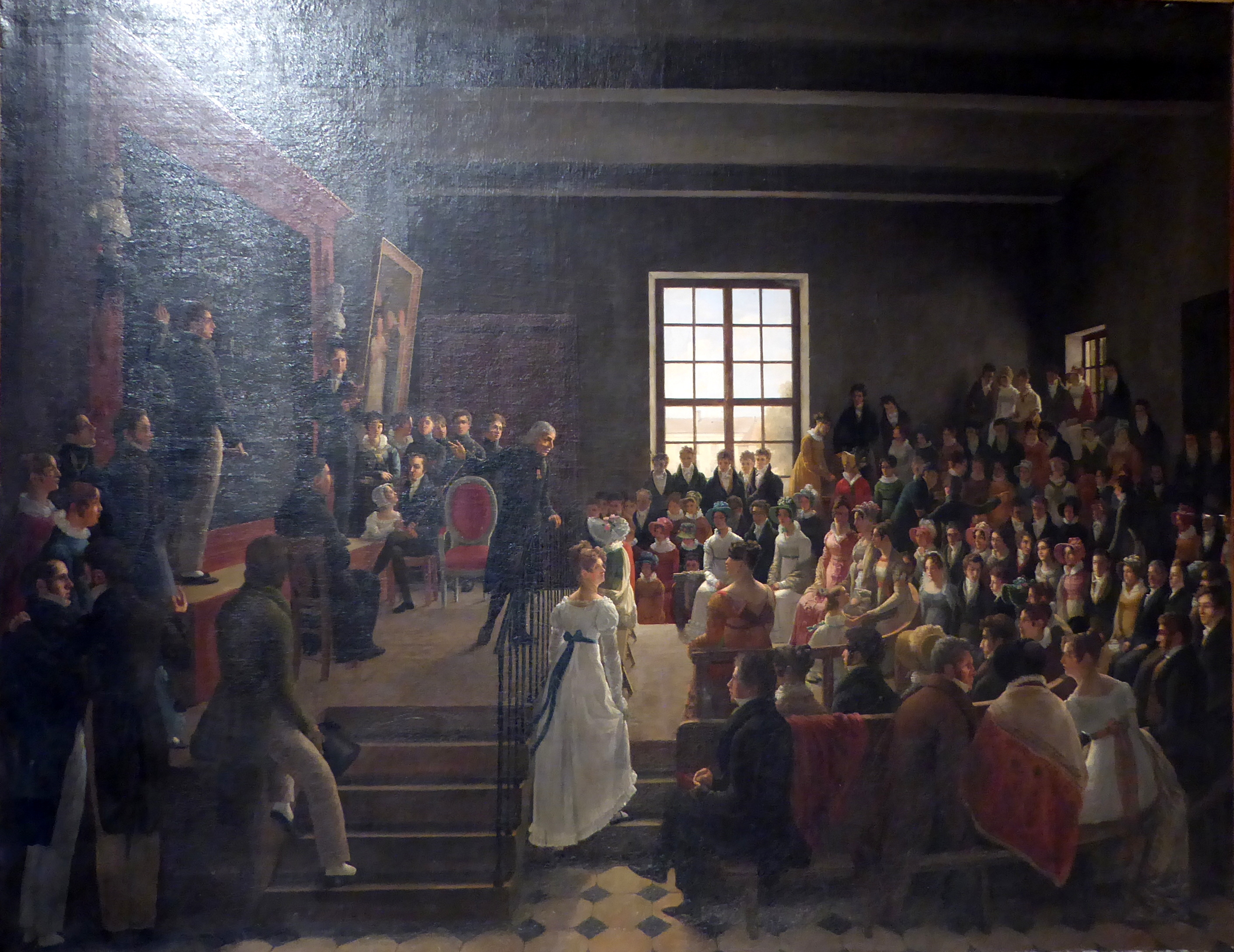
Léon Matthieu Cochereau, Pierre Prévost learning how to paint panoramas, oil on canvas, 105 x 130 cm, Chartres museum, Eure-et-Loir, France
