= Hammock (disambiguation) =

A hammock is a device used to sleep or rest in.

Hammock may also refer to:

- Hammock (surname)
- Hammock (band), an American post-rock group
- Hammock (ecology), a dense stand of trees
- Hammock Music, a record label
- The Hammock, an 1844 painting by Gustave Courbet

== See also ==
- Hummock (disambiguation)
