= Help of Christians Chapel, Bytom =

Help of Christians Chapel
- Polish: Kaplica Wspomożenia Wiernych
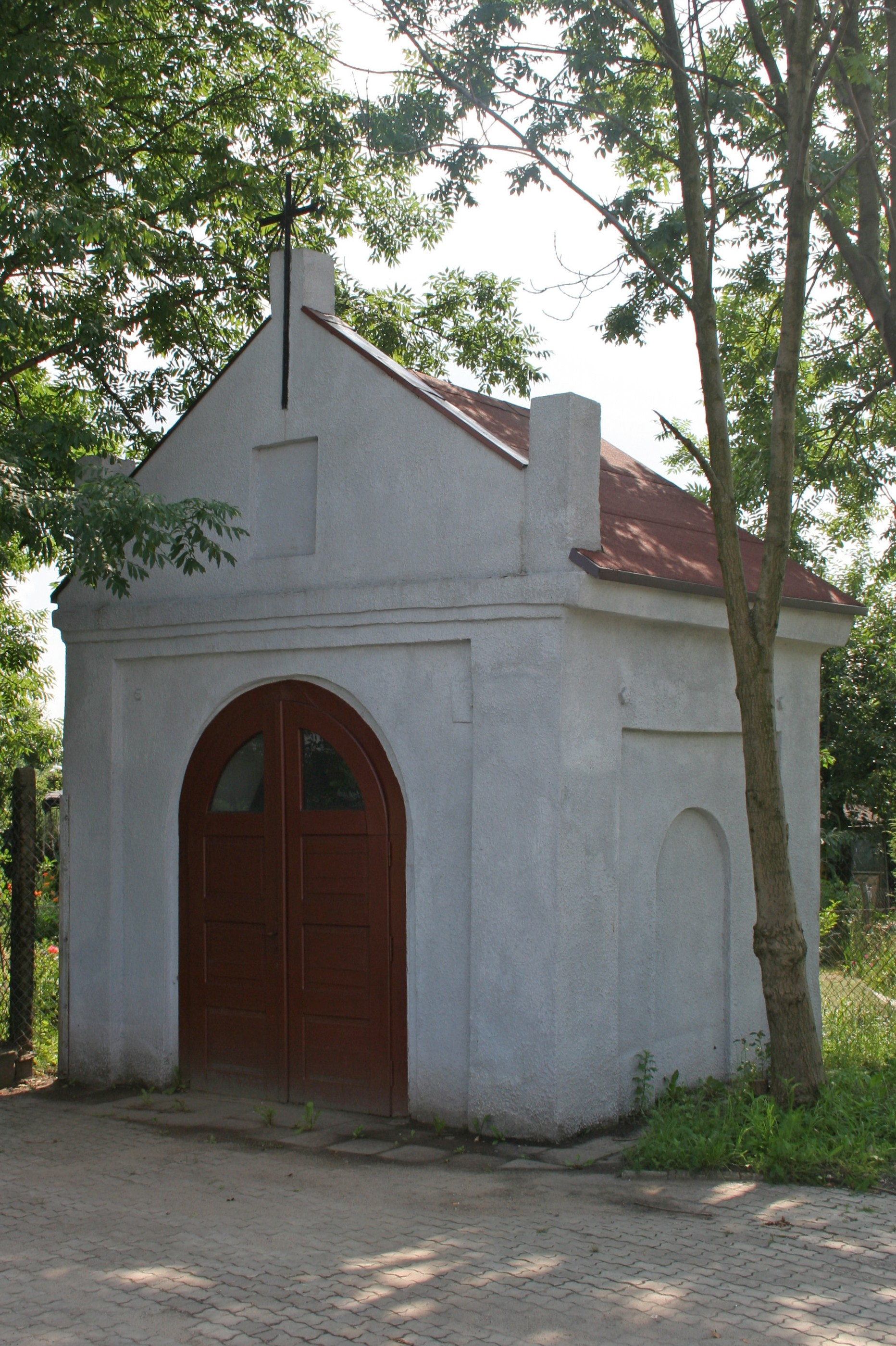
- The chapel in 2009.
- Help of Christians Chapel
- 50°21′52″N 18°54′02″E
- Location: Bytom
- Address: ul. Strzelców Bytomskich
- Country: Poland
- Denomination: Catholic

Architecture
- Style: Historicism
- Completed: Early 20th century

The Help of Christians Chapel in Bytom (Polish: Kaplica Wspomożenia Wiernych w Bytomiu) is a chapel situated in Bytom, Poland, on Strzelców Bytomskich Street.

The chapel is non-oriented and freestanding, built of brick and later plastered. The interior features a barrel vault. The walls bear traces of windows, now bricked up. The façade is topped with a triangular gable, crowned by a metal cross with trefoil-shaped arm endings.

To this day, Corpus Christi processions take place at the chapel.

== History ==
Although there are no precise records pertaining to the chapel's construction, nor to its architect, it appears on maps as early as 1916. The chapel was likely erected in the early 20th century, around the year 1905.

In the 1960s, restoration of the chapel was carried out to combat mining damages.

== Furnishings ==
Most of the furnishings were moved by the priest of the nearby parish of St. Joseph following a burglary which occurred in the late 1990s. Currently, the chapel's furnishings consist of a kneeler and an image of the Virgin Mary.
