= Hummock (disambiguation) =

A hummock is a small knoll or mound above ground.

Hummock may also refer to:

- Bundaberg Hummock, or The Hummock, an extinct volcanic in Queensland, Australia
- Hummock Island, Falkland Islands
- Hummock Lake, Idaho, U.S.
- Hummock Range, South Australia

== See also ==
- Hammock (disambiguation)
- Tussock (disambiguation)
- Kitts Hummock, Delaware, U.S.
- Moswetuset Hummock, a historic place in Quincy, Massachusetts, U.S.
- Three Hummock Island, Tasmania, Australia
- Three Hummocks Islands, Northern Territory, Australia
- Two Hummock Island, Antarctica
- Hummocky cross-stratification, sedimentary structure found in sandstones
- Hummocks Watchman Eagles Football Club, South Australia
