= Schayera baiulus =

Conservation status
- Critically Endangered (IUCN 2.3)

Scientific classification
- Kingdom: Animalia
- Phylum: Arthropoda
- Clade: Pancrustacea
- Class: Insecta
- Order: Orthoptera
- Suborder: Caelifera
- Family: Acrididae
- Genus: Schayera
- Species: S. baiulus

Binomial name
- Schayera baiulus Erichson, 1842

Species of grasshopper

Schayera baiulus (common name "Schayer's Grasshopper") is a species of grasshopper in the family of the Acrididae. The species is endemic to the Northern Region of Tasmania in Australia. The species is extremely rare and critically endangered, with only five confirmed specimens ever found.

== Description ==
An adult female Schayera baiulus is approximately 3.5 cm long, including its head and body, and is a flightless grasshopper. The appearance of the Schayera baiulus is similar to Apotropis spp. The male nymph specimen found suggests that an adult male would also be flightless due to the premature wing rudiments found on the young male grasshopper. However, no solid conclusion can be made on the flight ability of the male grasshopper due to the lack of evidence of a fully developed male Schayera baiulus. A female adult Schayer's grasshopper is known to be a pale brown with blotches of black colouring throughout its head and body. Immature Schayer's grasshoppers, also known as nymphs, differentiate in colour to adults as they can be pale grey to beige instead of pale brown with black mottling. The Schayera baiulus have relatively short antennae compared to other species in the same family. The colouring, size and description of an adult male Schayer's grasshopper is unavailable. However, it is hypothesised like most grasshoppers the adult male Schayera baiulus would be smaller and more fragile than female specimens. The male grasshopper specimen colouring is unavailable due to the length of time the specimen has spent in the 'killing bottle'. The contents of a killing bottle is the specimen and cyanide. Red asymmetrical patterns are visible on an older male specimen but this could be due to the effects of the 'killing bottle'.

== Comparison of specimens ==
The assessment of the female Schayera baiulus specimen's genitalia from Cape Grim was unique due to previous female specimens from Van Diemen's Land as previous specimens' internal organs being destroyed making proper analysis unachievable. The main difference between male and female Schayera baiulus is that a female specimen has a tapered abdomen that ends with an ovipositor. An ovipositor is a tube that aids female grasshoppers to lay eggs. Male grasshoppers have a more rounded abdomen that turns upwards and does not end in an ovipositor. Comparing a male and female Schayera baiulus shows that on a male nymph the wing rudiments extend over only half of the abdominal segment. The female Schayera baiulus has comparably larger wings than the male. The antenna on the male grasshopper is slightly more flattened that the female specimens. The fastigium on the male grasshopper is also much narrower and sharper.

The female Schayera baiulus specimen has shallow floor pouches. Post-vaginal sclerites were determined by visible minute areas of sclerotization at lateral extremities of the floor pouches, laterally on each side of base of egg guide, and narrowing caudad from mesal extremities of floor pouches over proximal half of egg guide. The columae was absent. From a dorsal view the Schayera baiulus's egg guide is sharply triangular and the arcuses are small. Schayer's grasshopper has a bursa copulatrix with an inwardly curved, narrow, longitudinal fold on each side. The female Schayera baiulus lacks a clearly differentiated dorsal lobe. Ventrocephalic median extension is triangular, medium-sized and shorter than other species of grasshopper. The female Schayera baiulus has a permatheca with duct of medium length, scarcely coiled that broadens slightly towards its entry dorsocephalad into a bursa copulatrix. The preapical diverticulum is reflexed with a U-shaped bend of the duct from its point of origin, the revered potion is an oval sac. The apical arms are about half the length of the diverticulum.

== Distribution ==
Schayer's grasshopper has a restricted distribution with only two known locations in the northwest and northeast of Tasmania. These are two very different habitats in terms of terrain. Schayera baiulus has an assumed low population density due to the rarity of specimens found at locations and lack of evidence of its habituation in those areas. Locations that the Schayera baiulus has been found in is Cape Grim, Tasmania and northwest of Gladstone near Rushy Lagoon, Tasmania. Both known specimen locations are uncultivated coastal lands that are not maintained due to the dense and natural forest locale. A live nymph specimen of Schayher's grasshopper was found near the Rushy Lagoon location near Tuckers Road, east of Red Hills in the open forest of the Allocasuarina verticillata trees.

The patterning and physical characteristics of the Schayera baiulus indicates that it would predominantly be a grasshopper that stays on the ground in short grasses. The previous finding of specimens within certain locations, also indicates that it might periodically travel from Woolnorth station to Circular Head. However, the rarity in collecting specimens over a 150-year period indicates that the species might be incredibly localised in its location in Tasmania. Previously collected specimens also indicate that the Schayera baiulus would most likely be discovered in spring or early summer.

== Threats ==
The Schayera baiulus grasshopper meets the criteria for listing as endangered on the Tasmanian Threatened Species Protection Act 1995. This means that any sort of construction or development within the area has to consider the impact it may have on the possible localities of this grasshopper. Without the recent collection of specimens this grasshopper may have been considered to be extinct. It is unknown whether the species is more widespread than the two locations it has been found on in Tasmania. It has been speculated that the grasshopper is common in more areas but has yet to be found.

Threats to the Schayera baiulus include overgrazing from wild and introduced animals, and the transformation of unkempt forest lands into more maintained and manicured areas. Further threats include a lack of survey effort and information on the species distribution abundance, lack of information on feeding habits and ecology habitat degradation or conversion at the known sites and Schayer's grasshopper populations being vulnerable to local extension through correlated and causal risks.

To prevent the decline of the endangered Schayera baiulus population efforts such as preventing the landscaping of known locations of habitat and also preventing any large scale operations should occur. There should be a management strategy in place to protect known sites and there should be an effort to gain more information about the species which could inform the management strategy. Before undertaking any forestry operations, environmental impact surveys should be undertaken and considered before operations begin. There should be no clearing or logging of any kind anywhere near these locations due to the speculation that the grasshopper may rely on these habitats too construct liveable areas.

Areas such as where previous specimens were previously found should be searched more frequently to try and study the subjects more. Surrounding coastal areas should also be routinely searched to identify more specimens and improve conditions.

Suggested areas for looking for further specimens of the Schayera baiulus include the coastal area between Cape Grim and Studland Bay, the north - western offshore islands of Robins, Hunter and Three Hummock, the rocky Cape National Park between Wynyard and Smithton, the Ringaroooma Tier area and the islands of the Furneaux group.

There have been no known precautions taken or management strategies in place to make a progressive effort in protecting the possible habitats of the Schayera baiulus grasshopper other than cautions for developers that are considering construction in or around those lands.

Any suspected sightings or collection of the elusive Schayera baiulus should be recorded well documented and confirmed by a relevant specialist.

== Rearing and development ==
Key discovered a live female nymph Woolnorth station near Rushy Lagoon on 15 November 1988 and brought it from Tasmania, Australia to the CSIRO institute in Canberra, Australia to rear it and observe its development. Despite being offered a variety of native grasses and plants for consumption such as Lomandra sp., an Acacia, several species of Melaleuca and Leptospermum, a Sonchus, a Cassina, Plantago lancelota L., the female nymph only consumed the Prunus plant which is an introduced plant. Aside from grasses and plants, the female nymph was also offered other artificial foods such as muesli and flaked fish food. Despite the wide variety of food offered the female nymph only consumed the introduced Prunus.

In December 1988 the female nymph moulted to instar, until finally reaching its final form as an adult on 17 February 1989. The stages between moulting were longer than the average grasshoppers. However, while the longevity between moults could be normal, it could also be due to a number of reasons such as inadequate diet, stress and improper habitat. Due to the infrequency of finding specimens and the lack of known facts about the Schayera baiulus this cannot be confirmed. During winter Schayer's grasshopper is in its nymphal stage which allows adults to be ready in the spring which disappear and then disappear again by about January. This is hypothesised due to the analysis of the captive female Schayera baiulus specimen.

The female Schayera baiulus specimen at the Division of Entomology at the CSIRO was kept in a standard individual rearing caged that was common in the Orthoptera unit. A standard individual rearing cage is a cylindrical glass jar that measures 165 by 95 millimetres, with a screw on lid of fine mesh brass screening through which a plastic tube with a 6 millimetres internal diameter was passed into an 80 by 25 millimetre glass food tube standing within the jar. The standing glass food tube could be topped up as needed through the plastic tube. Various plants and twigs were placed within the jar to prevent the grasshopper from climbing up the jar and a roll of dental cotton wool supplied the drinking water to the grasshopper. To prevent the grasshopper from climbing up the jar during moulting and the shedding of its exoskeleton a coil of copper gauze stood in the jar. The jar was held at a constant room temperature of 25 degrees Celsius with a 14-hour light and a 10-hour dark diurnal regime. Humidity was not controlled.

== Taxonomy ==
Schayer's grasshopper was initially found in 1842 by Aldolphus Schayer. Aldolphus Schayer was a superintendent of the far northwest, pastoral Van Diemen's Land Company property. The specimens Aldolphus Schayer found were on the pastoral Van Diemen's Land Company property in Woolnorth, Tasmania. Aldolphus Schayer found 3 confirmed specimens of the Schayera baiulus, all of which were female with no males found.

The Schayera baiulus was not found again until 9 October 1988 when E. J. Zurcher and C. A. Gilbert collected a deceased male nymph Schayera baiulus on behalf of KHL Key. Key recognised the deceased specimen as a rare and endangered Scahyera baiulus and concluded that the species must be endemic to Tasmania and was not yet extinct or restricted in locale to northwest Tasmania near Rushy Lagoon. A deceased young male nymph grasshopper was found near Rushy Lagoon and a live female Schayer's grasshopper was found near Cape Grim.

Key personally found and identified the live female Schayera baiulus nymph at Woolnorth station near Rushy Lagoon on 15 November 1988. After finding the female nymph, Key and his group returned to the area where the male nymph was found by E. J. Zurcher and C. A. Gilbert. Key and his companions searched for several days between 10 and 14 January 1989 with no result of finding another specimen of the Schayera baiulus.
