= Am Römerholz =

Swiss art collection formed by Oskar Reinhart

Coordinates: 47°30′40″N 8°43′54″E

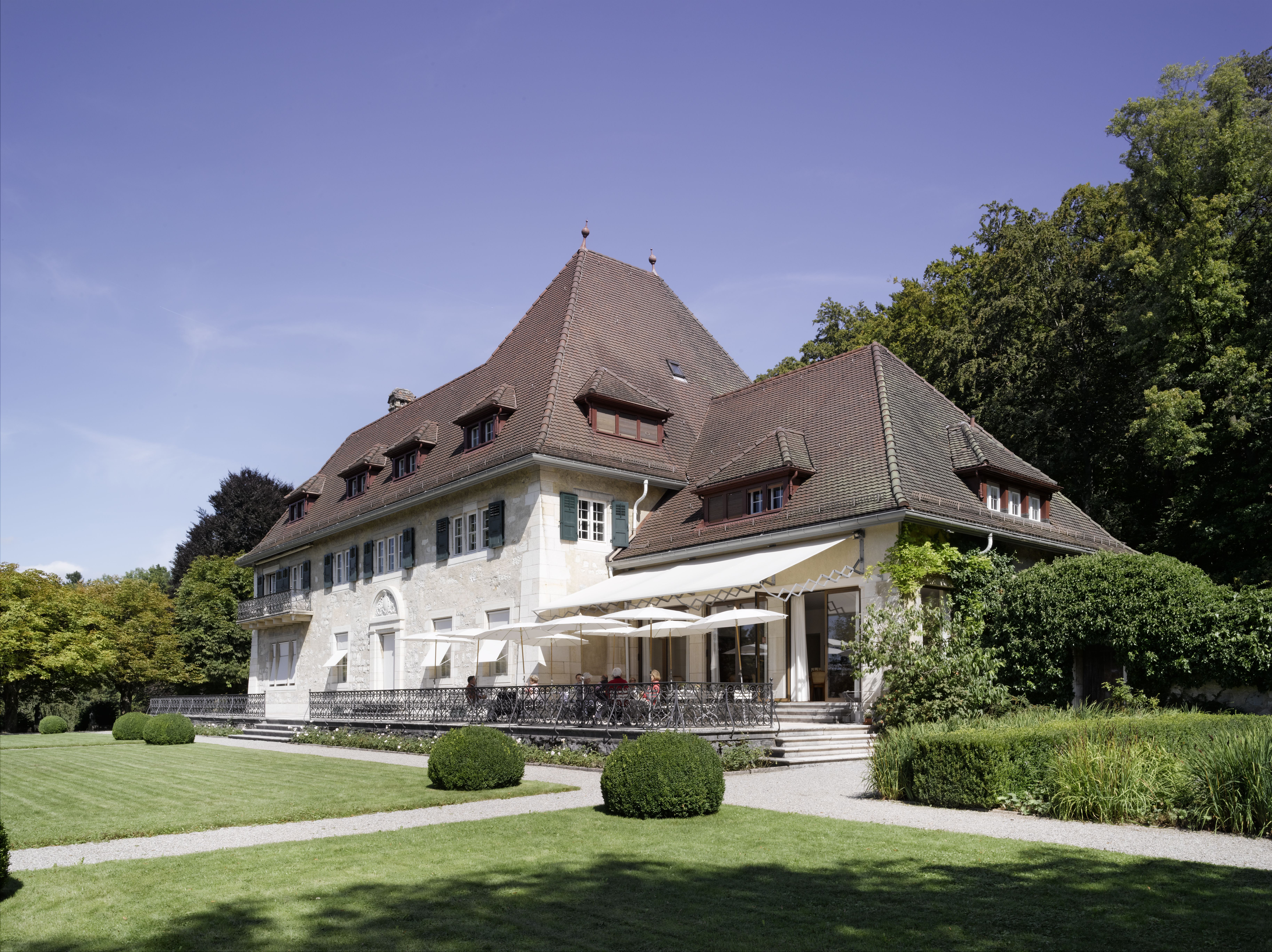
Villa Am Römerholz

The Reinhart Collection formed by Oskar Reinhart is now displayed in a museum in his old house, "Am Römerholz" in Winterthur, Zurich Canton, Switzerland, as well as the Museum Oskar Reinhart in the centre of Winterthur. It belongs to the Swiss Confederation, Federal Office of Culture (Bundesamt für Kultur, Bern).

The collection owns paintings by artists including Matthias Grünewald, Lukas Cranach, Vincent van Gogh (two paintings of the Hospital in Arles - ward and garden), Pieter Breughel the Elder (Adoration of the Magi in the Snow), Pierre-Auguste Renoir, Édouard Manet, Paul Cézanne, Eugène Delacroix, Théodore Géricault, Camille Corot, Honoré Daumier, Jean-François Millet, Gustave Courbet, Edgar Degas, Camille Pissarro, and Alfred Sisley.

The villa is building of 1915, designed by Maurice Turrettini.

== Gallery ==
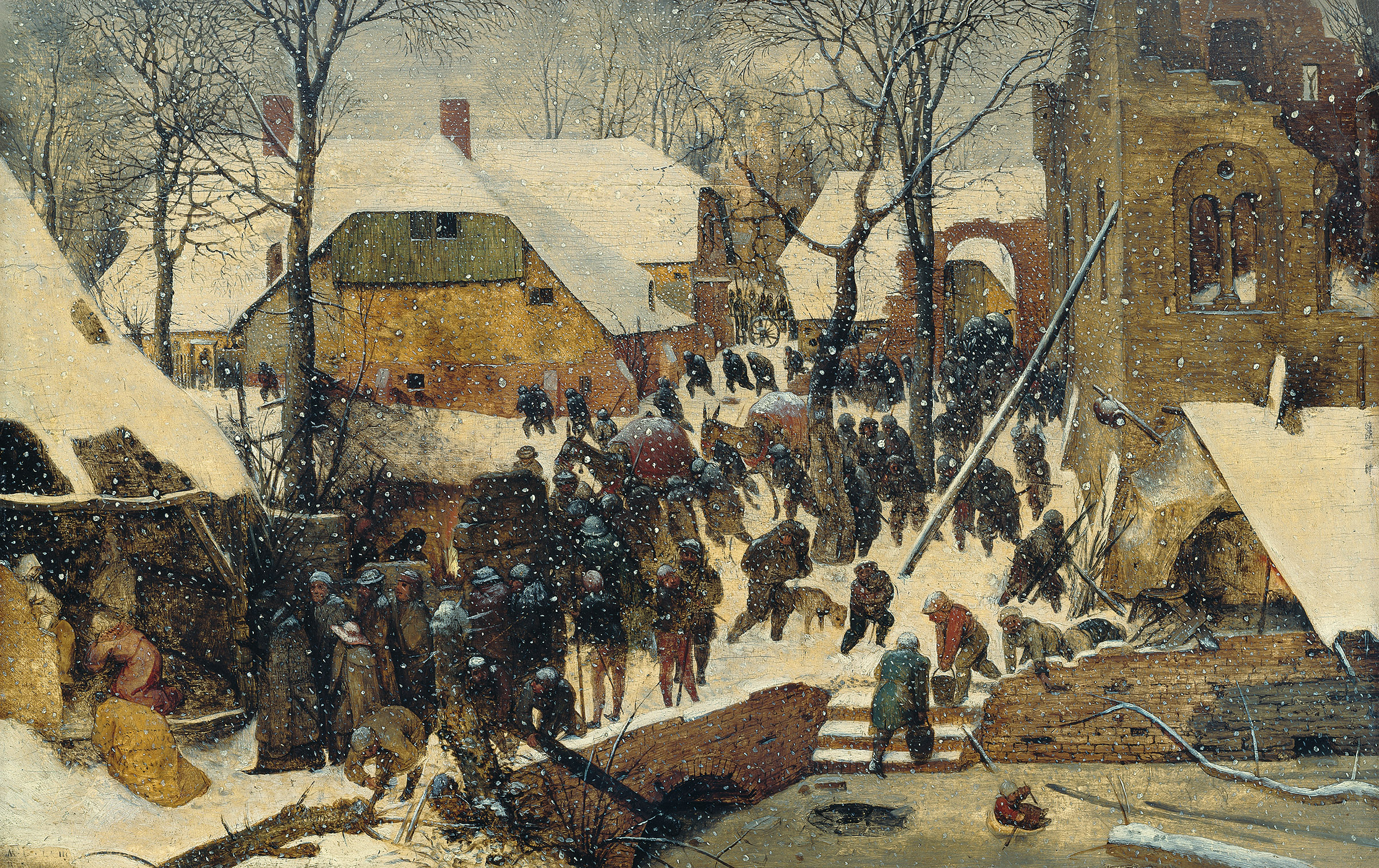
Pieter Breughel the Elder, Adoration of the Magi in the Snow, 1563

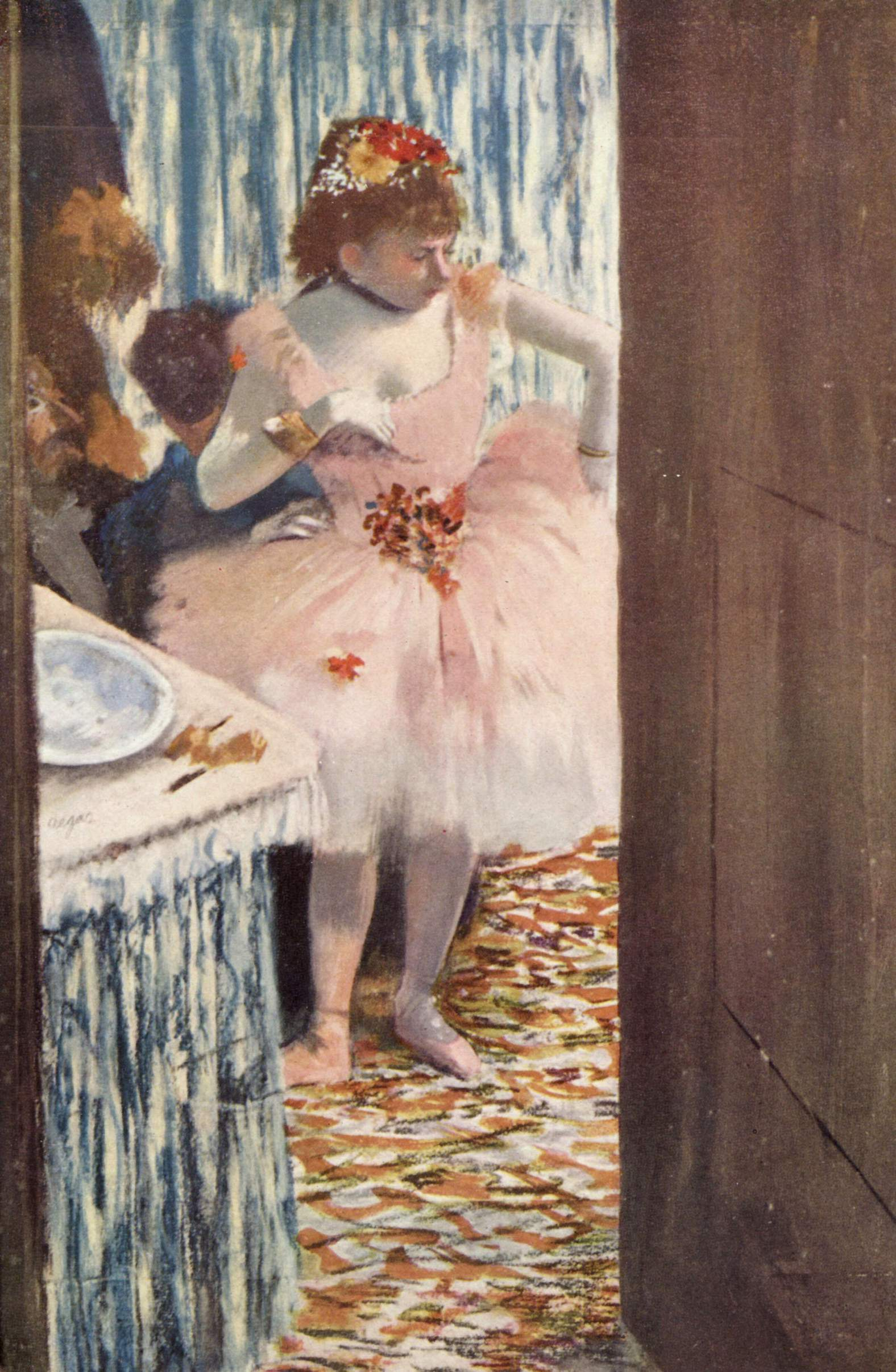
Edgar Degas: Tänzerin in ihrer Loge

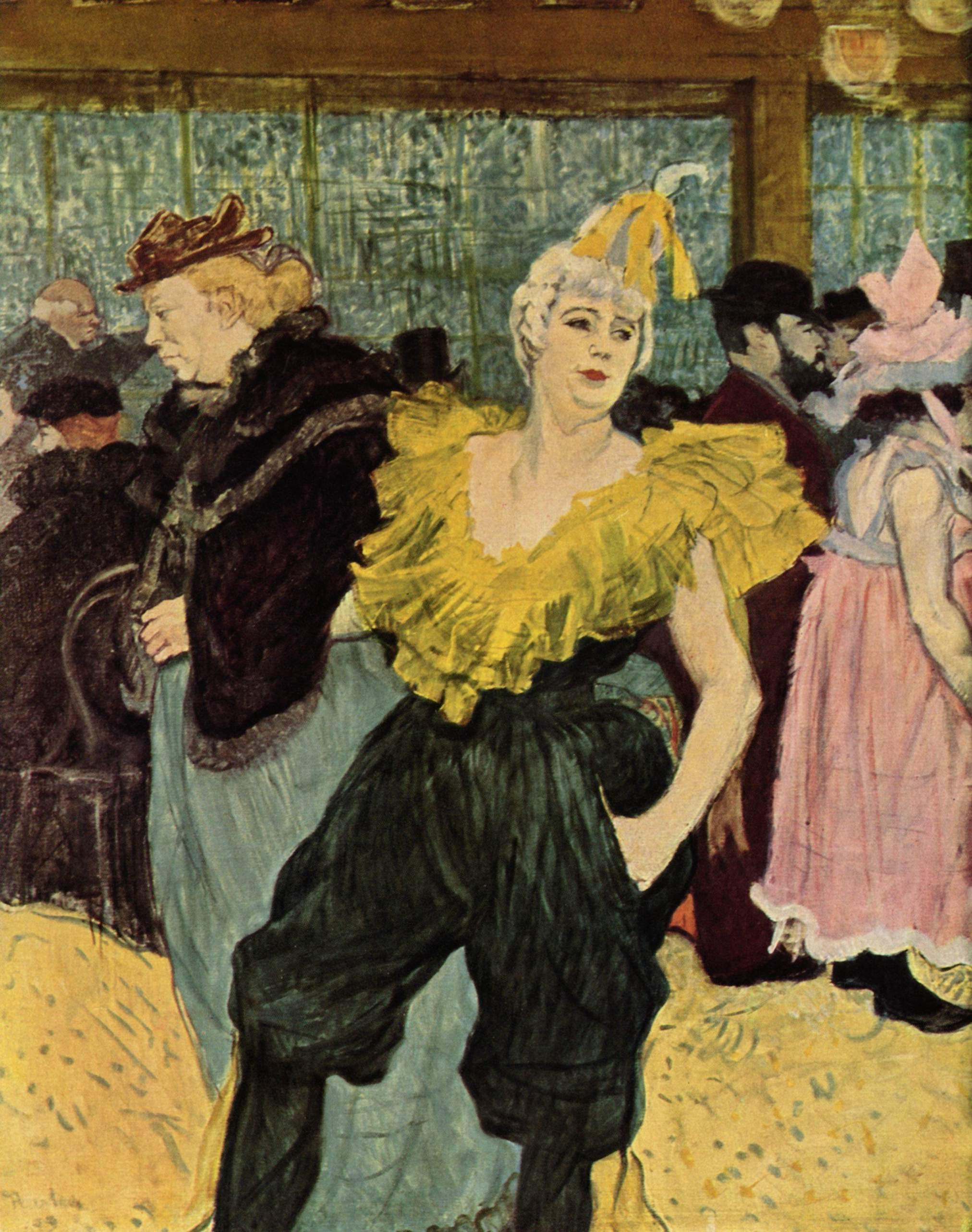
Henri de Toulouse-Lautrec: La Clownesse Cha-U-Ka-O in Moulin Rouge

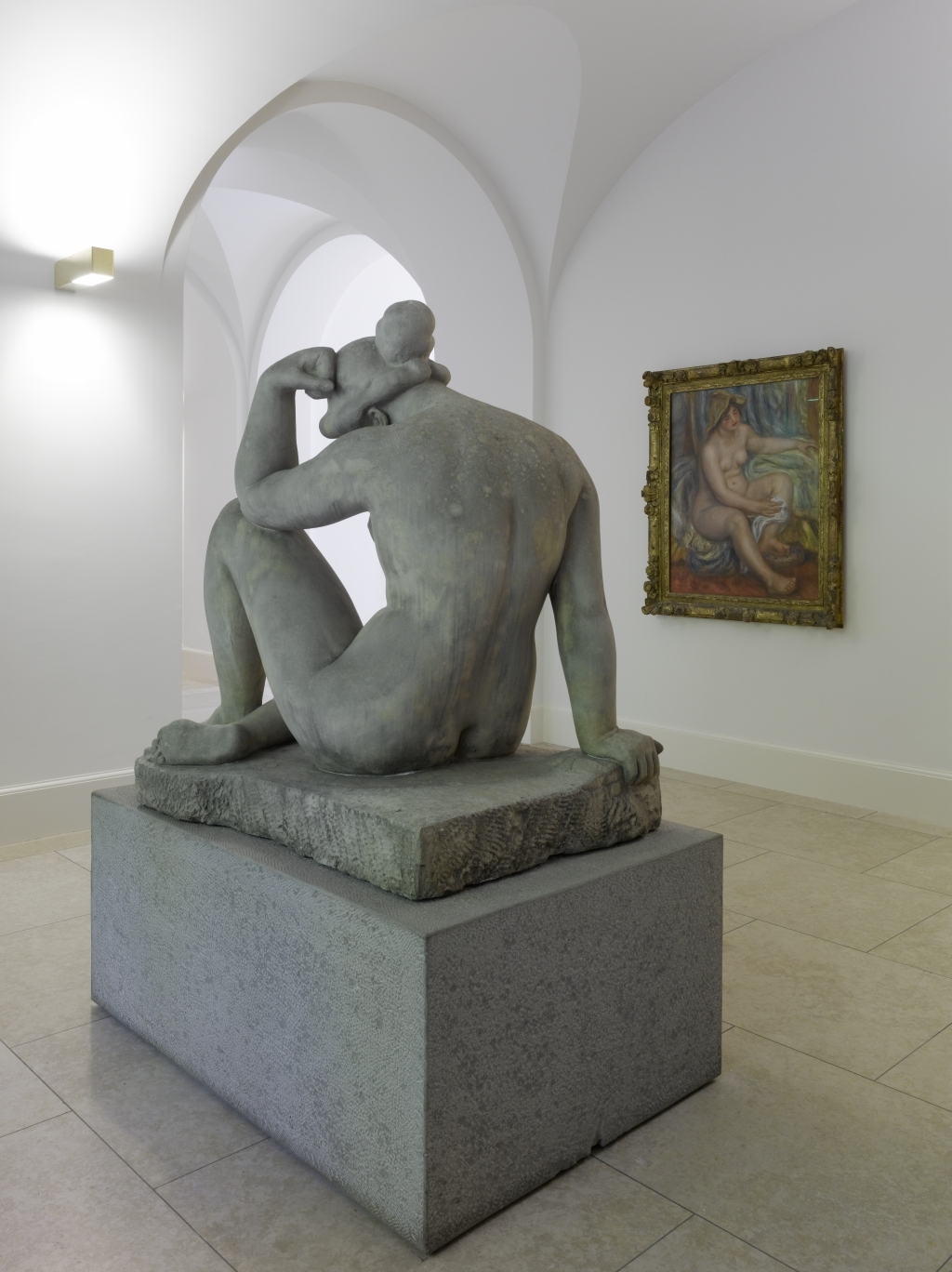
Aristide Maillol: La Méditerranée

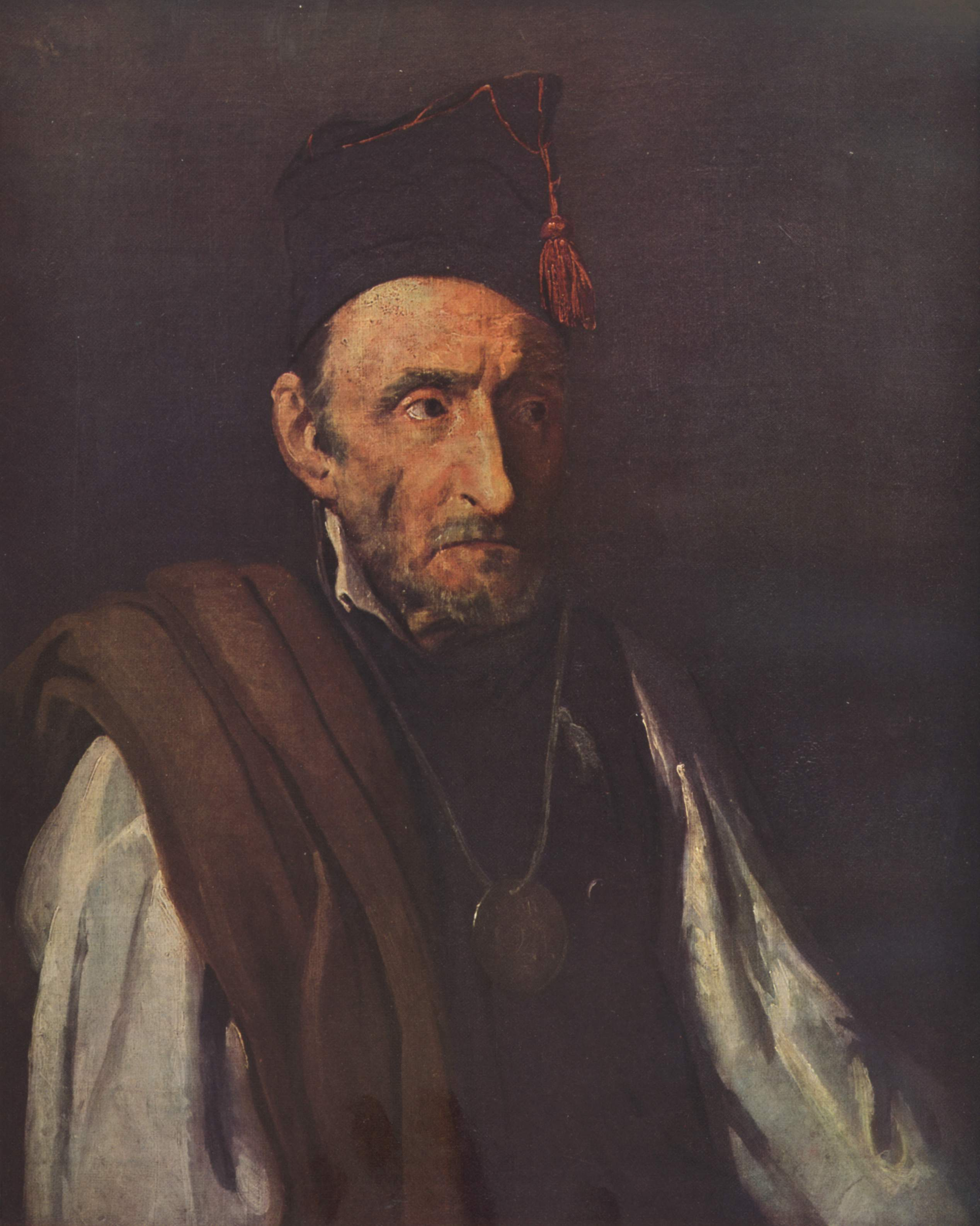
Théodore Géricault: Man with Delusions of Military Command

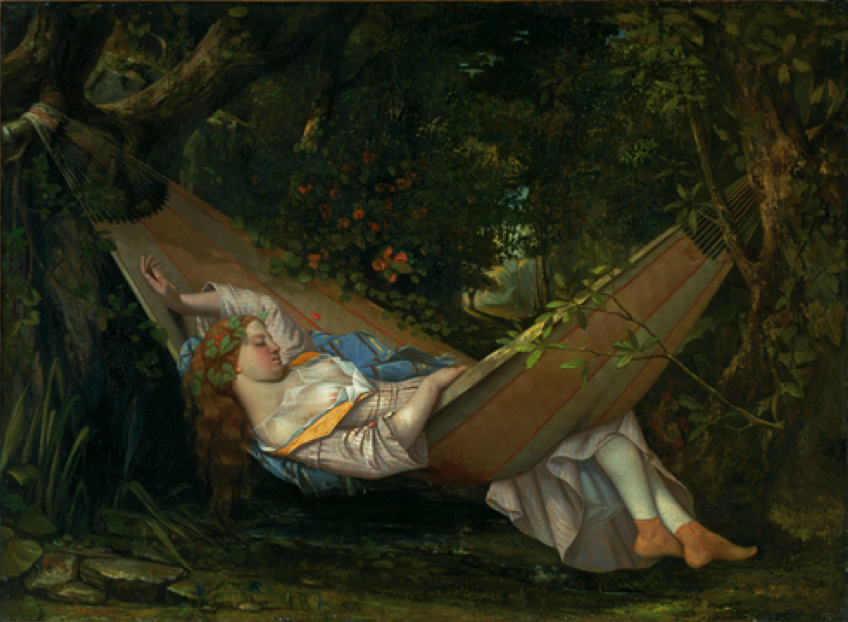
The Hammock by Gustave Courbet, 1844
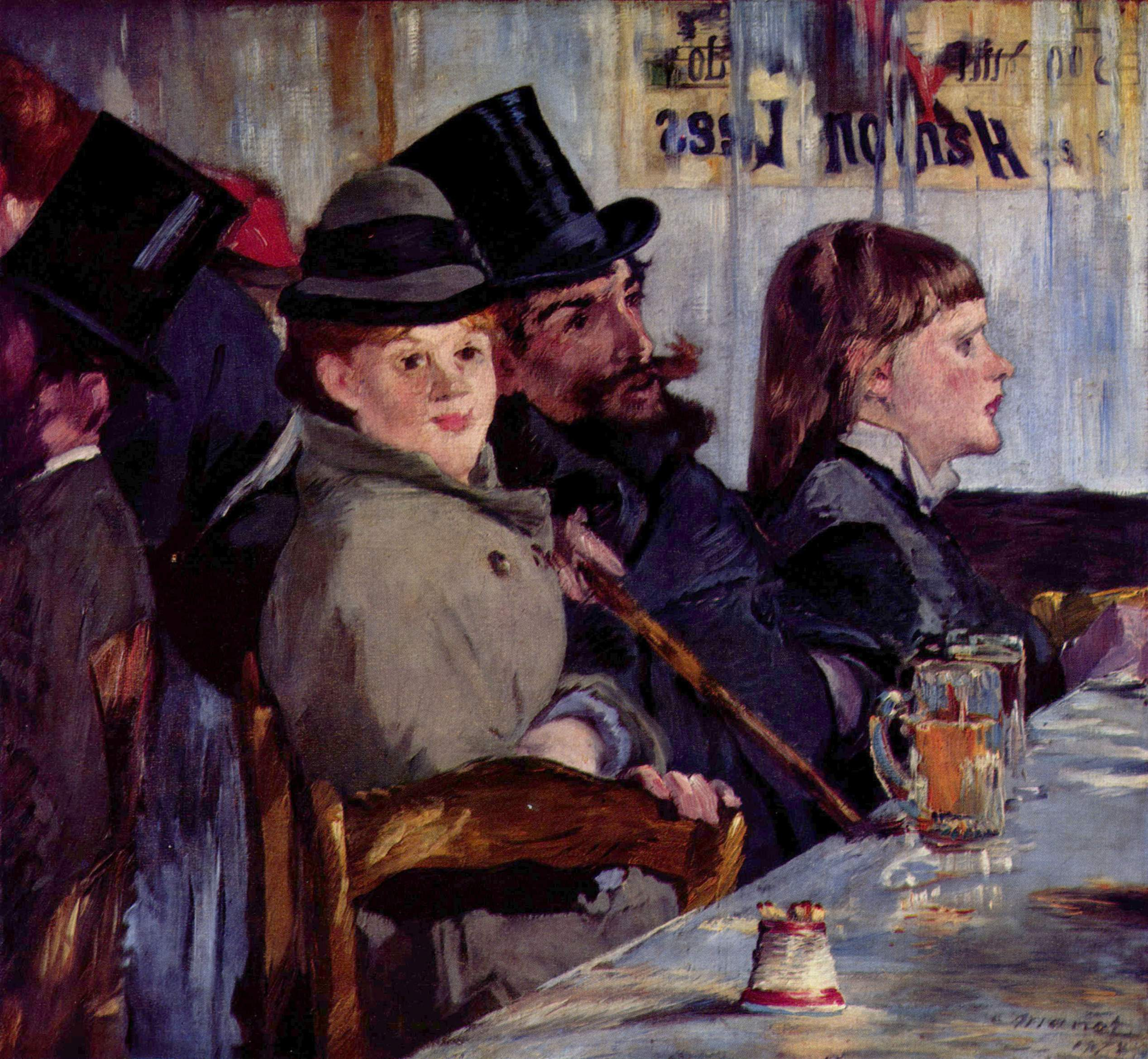
Édouard Manet: Au Café

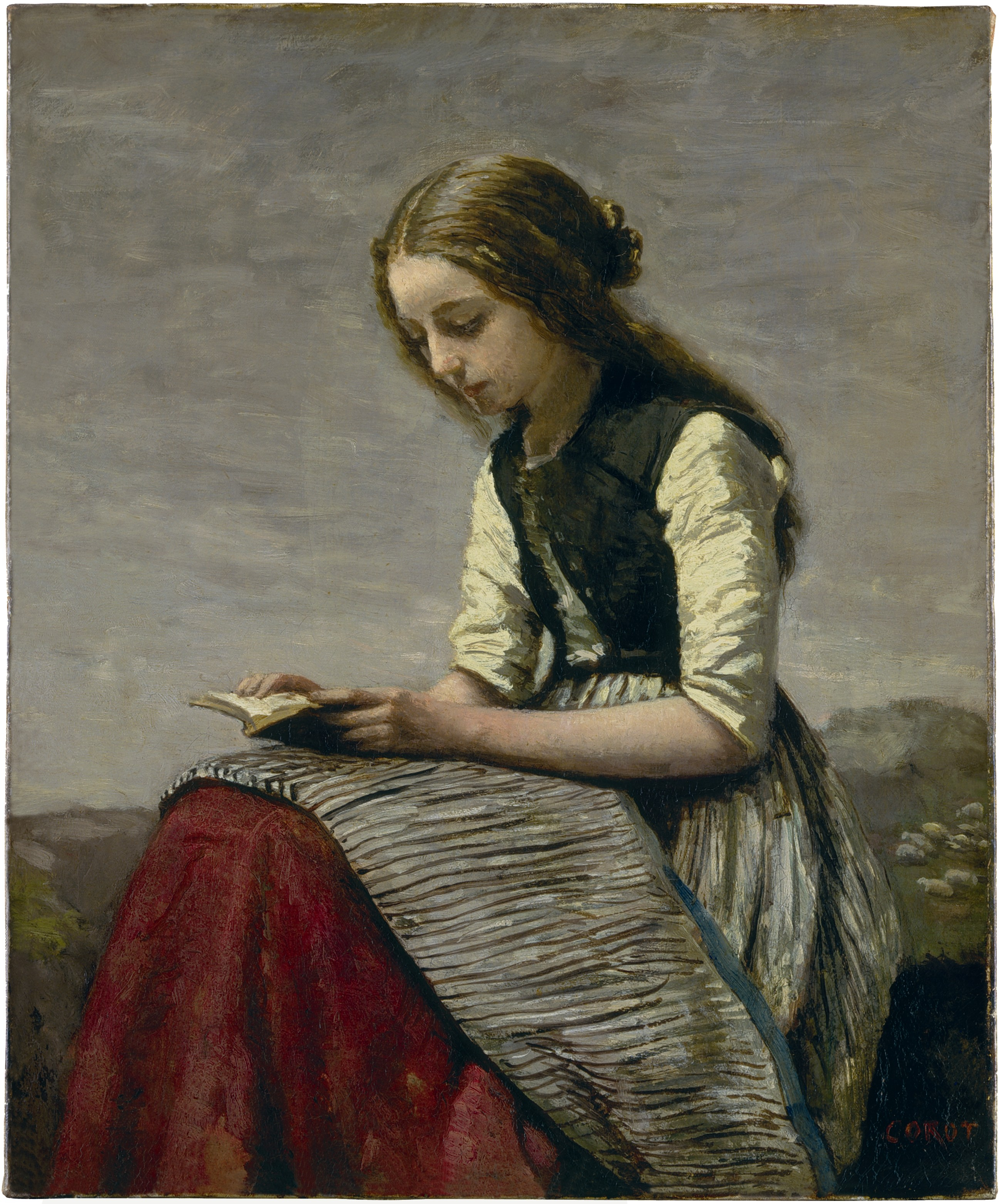
Camille Corot: Reading Girl, around 1850

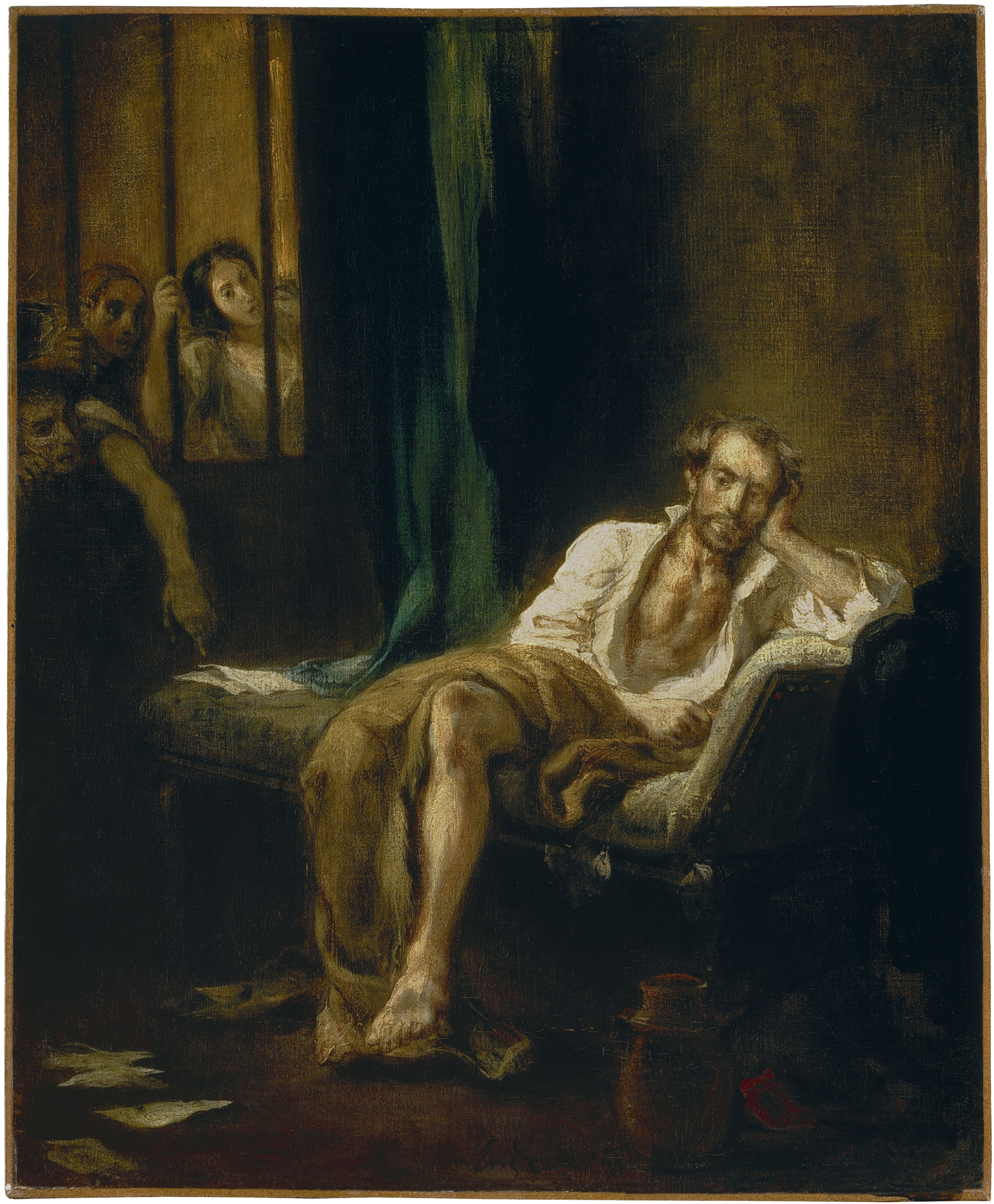
Eugène Delacroix: Tasso in the Madhouse, 1839

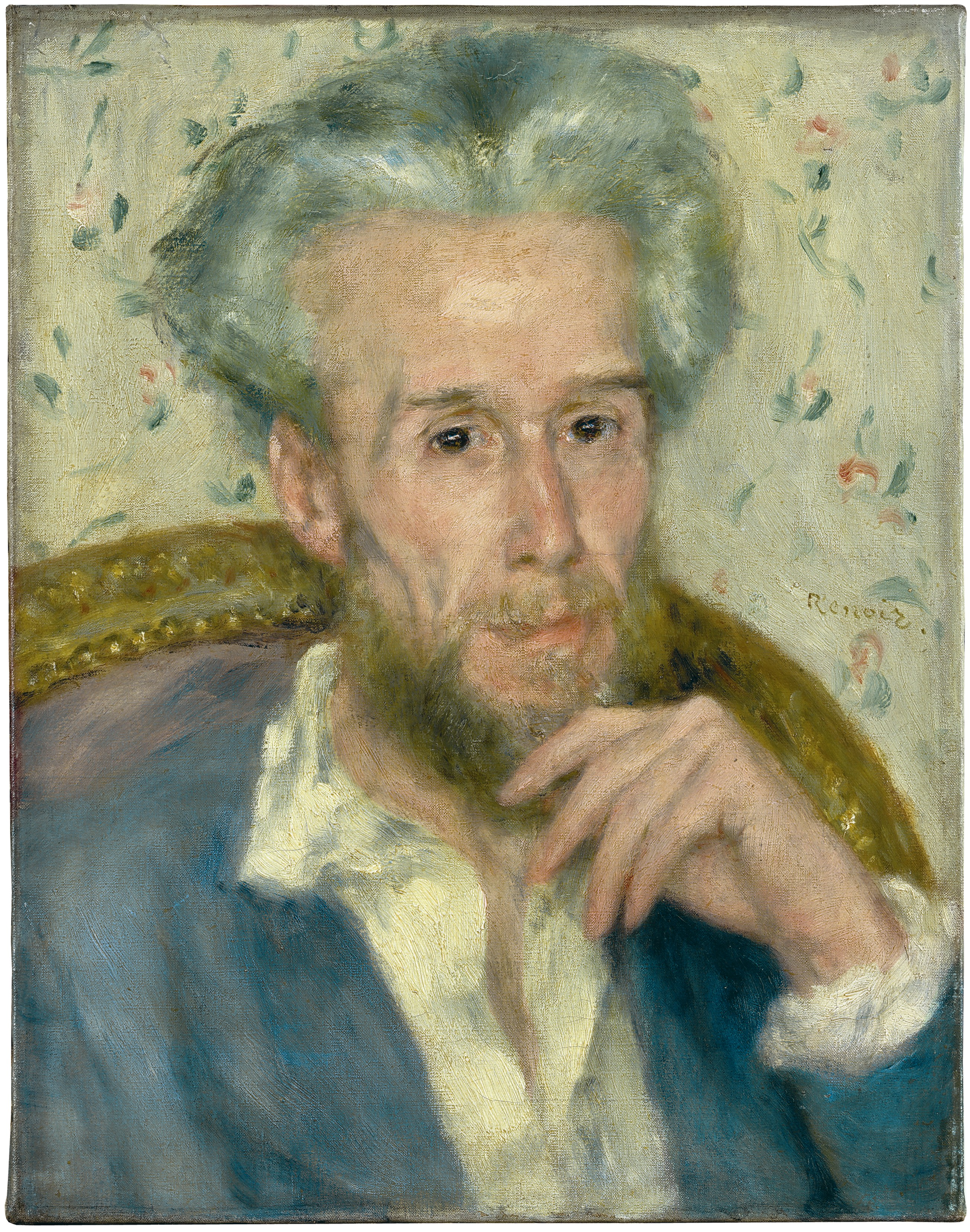
Pierre-Auguste Renoir: Victor Chocquet, around 1876

== See also ==
- List of museums in Switzerland

== Sources ==
Media related to Oskar Reinhart Collection 'Am Römerholz' at Wikimedia Commons

- https://web.archive.org/web/20110726220452/http://www.insecula.com/musee/M0223.html
- http://www.roemerholz.ch
