= The Hammock =

Painting by Gustave Courbet

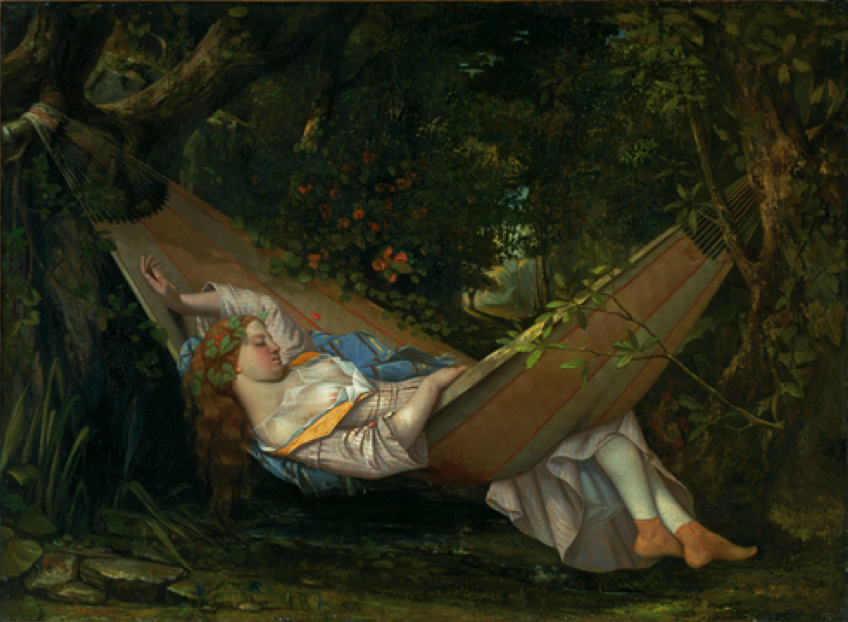
- Artist: Gustave Courbet
- Year: 1844
- Type: Oil on canvas
- Dimensions: 79.5 cm × 97 cm (31.3 in × 38 in)
- Location: Am Römerholz; Winterthur

The Hammock (French: Le Rêve, German: Die Hängematte) is an 1844 oil painting by the French artist Gustave Courbet. It depicts a young woman sleeping on a hammock in a shady, wooded glade with a brook passing nearby. It makes reference to Victor Hugo's 1829 poem Sara the Bather. It was submitted to the Salon of 1845 at the Louvre in Paris, but rejected by the authorities.

The painting is in the Reinhart Collection at Am Römerholz in Winterthur in Switzerland.

== Bibliography ==
- Bade, Patrick. Gustave Courbet and artworks. Parkstone International, 2014.
- Lindsay, Jack. Gustave Courbet: His Life and Art. Adams and Dart, 1973.
- Søland, Birgitte, Benninghaus, Christina & Maynes, Mary Jo (ed.) Secret Gardens, Satanic Mills: Placing Girls in European History, 1750-1960. Indiana University Press, 2005.
