= Schayera =

Scientific classification
- Kingdom: Animalia
- Phylum: Arthropoda
- Clade: Pancrustacea
- Class: Insecta
- Order: Orthoptera
- Suborder: Caelifera
- Family: Acrididae
- Subfamily: Catantopinae
- Tribe: Catantopini
- Genus: Schayera; Key, 1990

Genus of grasshoppers

Schayera is a monotypic genus of grasshopper in the tribe Catantopini from Tasmania.

Species is Schayera baiulus
