= Tussock =

Tussock may refer to:

- a firm clump of grass or vegetation in a marsh or boggy ground
- Tussock grass, a group of species in the family Poaceae
- Floating island
- Lymantriinae, called tussock moths or tussocks

== See also ==
- Hassock (disambiguation)
- Hummock (disambiguation)
- Hillock
