= Hassock =

Hassock may refer to:

- a firm clump of grass or sedge in boggy ground, especially Carex cespitosa
- Kneeler, a cushion or a piece of furniture for resting during Christian prayer
- Ottoman (furniture), a footstool
- Tuffet, a low seat

== See also ==
- Hassocks, a village in West Sussex, England
- Tussock (disambiguation)
