= Maurice Turrettini =

Swiss architect

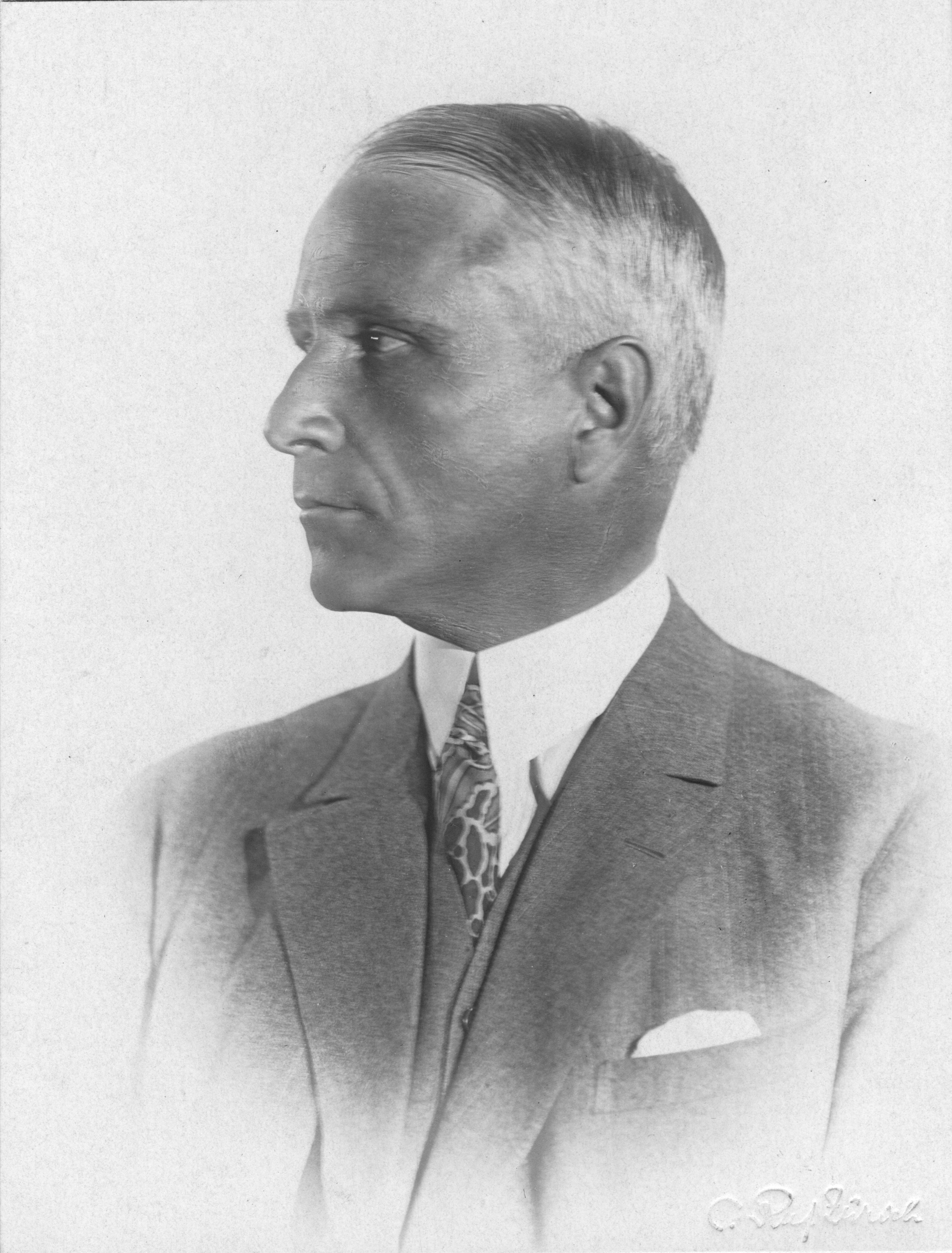
Maurice Turrettini

Maurice Turrettini (24 July 1878, in Geneva – 25 October 1932, in Boisy) was a Swiss architect, most notable for his design of Am Römerholz.

== Bibliography ==
- (in French) Summary in Bulletin technique de la Suisse romande, 58(1932)
- (in German) Isabelle Rucki [et al.]: Architektenlexikon der Schweiz : 19./20. Jahrhundert. Verlag Birkhäuser, Basel 1998 ISBN 3-7643-5261-2, pages 462/463
