= Hammock (surname) =

Hammock is a surname. Notable people with the surname include:

- Bruce Hammock (1947–2026), American entomologist, chemist and toxicologist
- Charles Hammock (1941–2014), American politician from Pennsylvania
- Christina Koch (née Hammock; born 1979), American astronaut
- Cicero C. Hammock (1823–1890), American politician from Georgia
- Dayle Hammock (1947–2024), American politician from South Dakota
- Lee Thommock (né Hammock; 1976–2022), American writer and game designer
- Robby Hammock (born 1977), American Major League Baseball player and coach
- Thomas Hammock (born 1981), American coach
- Pete Johnson (né Willie James Hammock; born 1954), American former professional football player
