= Bruce Hammock =

American entomologist and toxicologist (1947–2026)

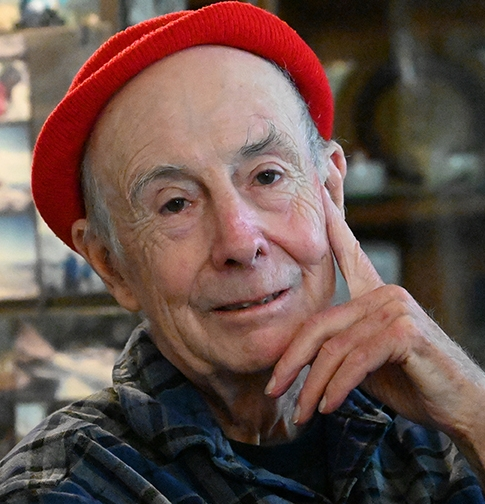
- Hammock in 2023
- Born: August 13, 1947; Little Rock, Arkansas, U.S.
- Died: January 5, 2026 (aged 78); Davis, California, U.S.
- Education: Louisiana State University; University of California, Berkeley
- Scientific career
- Fields: Entomology; Toxicology; Zoology; Chemistry
- Workplaces: Northwestern University; University of California, Davis; University of California, Riverside
- Website: www.biopestlab.ucdavis.edu/home

Bruce Dupree Hammock (August 13, 1947 – January 5, 2026) was an American entomologist, chemist and toxicologist. He was known for his research regarding improving pest control agents, monitoring and determining the human and environmental health effects of pesticides and in medicine work on the inflammation resolving branch of the arachidonate cascade leading to a drug candidate to treat pain and inflammatory disease. Additionally, he made many advances in U.S. agriculture which led to him receiving the Frasch and Spencer Awards of the ACS and the Alexander von Humboldt Award in Agriculture. His early work tested the basic hypothesis in both insects and mammals that regulation of chemical mediators could be as much by specific degradation as by biosynthesis. He exploited this fundamental knowledge both in agriculture and in human pharmacology.

In 1980, Hammock joined the University of California, Davis as an associate professor of Entomology and Environmental Toxicology. Since then, he has become a crucial part of campus by taking on roles such as being an active member of the UC Davis Comprehensive Cancer Center, principal investigator of the Biotechnology Training grant for 15 years and the program director of the NIEHS UC Davis Superfund Basic Research Program for the past 35 years.

== Early life and education ==
Bruce D. Hammock was born on August 13, 1947, in Little Rock, Arkansas where he attended high school. His father was a postal worker and his mother sold encyclopedias. As a young boy, he developed a love of natural history in part through Boy Scouts and enjoyed studying and befriending creatures in the nearby forest, including a pet raccoon named "Willy".

Hammock attended Louisiana State University in Baton Rouge starting in forestry but moving to entomology, obtaining a B.S. magna cum laude in Entomology (with minors in Zoology and Chemistry) in 1969. He also obtained a PhD in Entomology-Toxicology at UC Berkeley in 1973 studying with John Casida. He then went on active duty as a medical officer at the U.S. Army Academy of Health Sciences where he developed a lifelong interest in controlling pain and inflammation. He became a Rockefeller Postdoctoral Fellow in Biochemistry at Northwestern University in 1974. Starting in 1975, he held his first academic position at UC Riverside for five years, then later became a professor at UC Davis in 1980, where he taught biochemistry, endocrinology, toxicology, and pharmaceutical discovery and development. For decades he also taught mountaineering and whitewater kayaking through the UCD Outdoor Adventures program, and started the institutionalization of annual water balloon fights, better known as "Bruce's Big Balloon Battle at Briggs".

== Research ==
Throughout his career, Hammock explored diverse research areas including insect physiology, toxicology, pharmacology, and experimental therapeutics. In his Ph.D. he studied both basic insect developmental biology and the development of ‘green pesticides’ based on insect hormones. It was here he developed the hypothesis that degradation of chemical mediators was important in physiology. In insects this led to the development of recombinant viral insecticides and in mammals to a new target for control of pain and inflammation in man and companion animals. At UC Riverside he continued the above work and also pioneered the use of immunoassays for monitoring human and environmental exposure to pesticides and remains a leader in the field.

Hammock continually moved between fundamental research and its application. Amongst his many research endeavors, he found a key hydrolytic enzyme that controlled insect metamorphosis and exploited this by developing transition state inhibitors that altered insect development. Then he used this hydrolytic enzyme in a transgenic viral insecticide. He found another hydrolytic enzyme important in insect development that also controlled key biological functions in mammals. His laboratory developed transition state inhibitors of this enzyme as well, which are used in human clinical trials where they reduce pain and inflammation. In addition, his lab pioneered immunoassay techniques for analyzing both humans and environmental exposure to pesticides and other contaminants. He continued as an internationally recognized figure in these fields for over five decades and has published over 1500 papers.

== Major services to the scientific community ==
From 1986 to 1987, Hammock served as the Pharmacology and Toxicology Graduate Group Chair in UC Davis. In 1987, Hammock became the director of the Nation's first Superfund Research Program at UC Davis and ran the program for over 35 years. This is a fund that supports interdisciplinary scientists in finding solutions to complex health and environmental issues caused by hazardous waste contamination. For 14 years he ran a NIH Training Grant in Biotechnology at UC Davis for cross training in physical and biological sciences. He was also one of the founding members of the UC Davis Medical School Comprehensive Cancer Center, which started in 1991. From 2002 to 2016, Hammock served as the director of the UC Davis's National Institute of Health Biotechnology Training Program and the National Institute of Environmental Health Sciences Combined Analytical Laboratory at UC Davis. He was one of the founding board members of UCDMC's Center for Pain Relief — members of Hammock founded three companies: Synthia (2015) to assist students and postgraduates with technology transfer, Arete Therapeutics (2003), and EicOsis (2011) in pharmaceutical development to move soluble epoxide hydrolase inhibitors into the clinic.

== Personal life and death ==
Hammock married Lassie May Graham of Fresno. They had three children, Thomas, Bruce and Frances, and also two grandchildren, Max and Lelia Ioana. He died on January 5, 2026, at the age of 78.

== Awards and honors ==
- Royal Society of Chemistry's Horizon Team Award (2021)
- Lifetime Achievement Award in Innovation (2020)
- National Institutes of Environmental Health (NIEHS) RIVER "Outstanding Investigator" Award (2019)
- "Outstanding Achievement" Award from Eicosanoid Research Foundation (2017)
- John McGiff Memorial Lecturer Award from WEC (2016)
- Elected to National Academy of Inventors (2015)
- Bernard Brodie Award in Drug Metabolism from ASPET (2014)
- William E.H. Lands Lecturer in Biochemistry and Nutrition (2013)
- UCD Distinguished Teaching Award (2008)
- UCD Academic Senate's Faculty Research Lecturer Award (2001)
- Elected to National Academy of Sciences (1999)
- ESA's Recognition Award for Insect Physiology, Biochemistry and Toxicology (1998)
- Alexander von Humboldt Foundation Award in Agriculture (1995)
- Kenneth A. Spencer Award of the American Chemical Society (1993)
- International Award in Pesticide Chemistry of the American Chemical Society (1993)
- Burroughs Wellcome Toxicology Scholar Award from the Society of Toxicology (1987)
- Frasch Foundation Award in Agricultural Chemistry (1982–1987)
- National Institutes of Health Research Career Development Award (1978–1984)
- Rockefeller Foundation Postdoctoral Fellowship (1973–1974)
