= Kneeler =

Furniture in a place of worship for kneeling

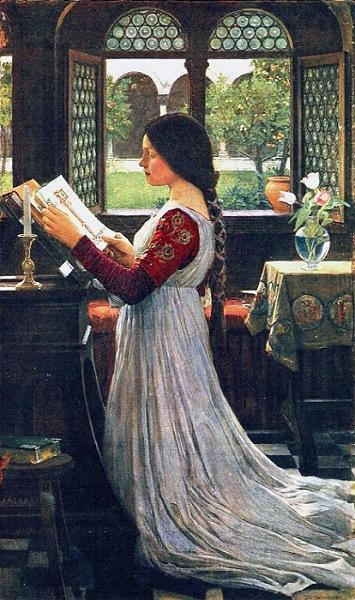
The Missal, by John William Waterhouse (1902), depicts a woman kneeling on a prie-dieu, a piece of furniture with a built-in kneeler

A kneeler is a cushion (also called a tuffet, hassock, genuflexorium, or genuflectorium) or a piece of furniture used for resting in a kneeling position during Christian prayer.

In many churches, pews are equipped with kneelers in front of the seating bench so members of the congregation can kneel on them instead of the floor. In a few other situations, such as confessionals and areas in front of an altar, kneelers for kneeling during prayer or sacraments may also be used. Traditionally, altar rails often have built-in knee cushions to facilitate reception of Holy Communion while kneeling.

A kneeler is also a part of the prie-dieu prayer desk, which is found in churches (often in front of votive candles), as well in homes at which persons read the Bible and pray the breviary.

Kneelers in churches are a modern development. Kneeling was not part of the Mass in early Christianity, and has been part of the Catholic Mass and Evangelical-Lutheran Mass since the 16th century.

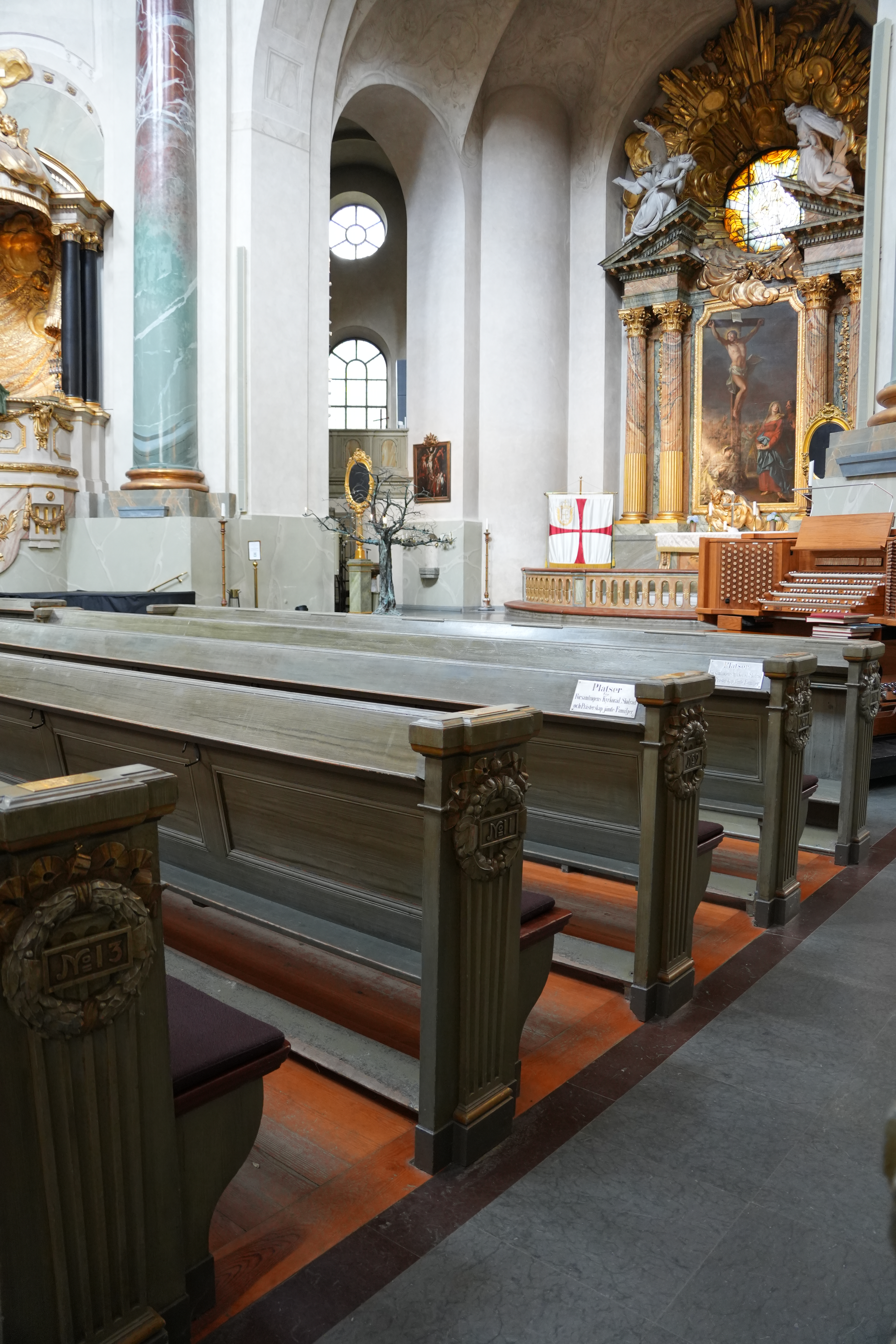
Pews with kneelers at Hedvig Eleonora Church (Evangelical-Lutheran) in Östermalm, Sweden

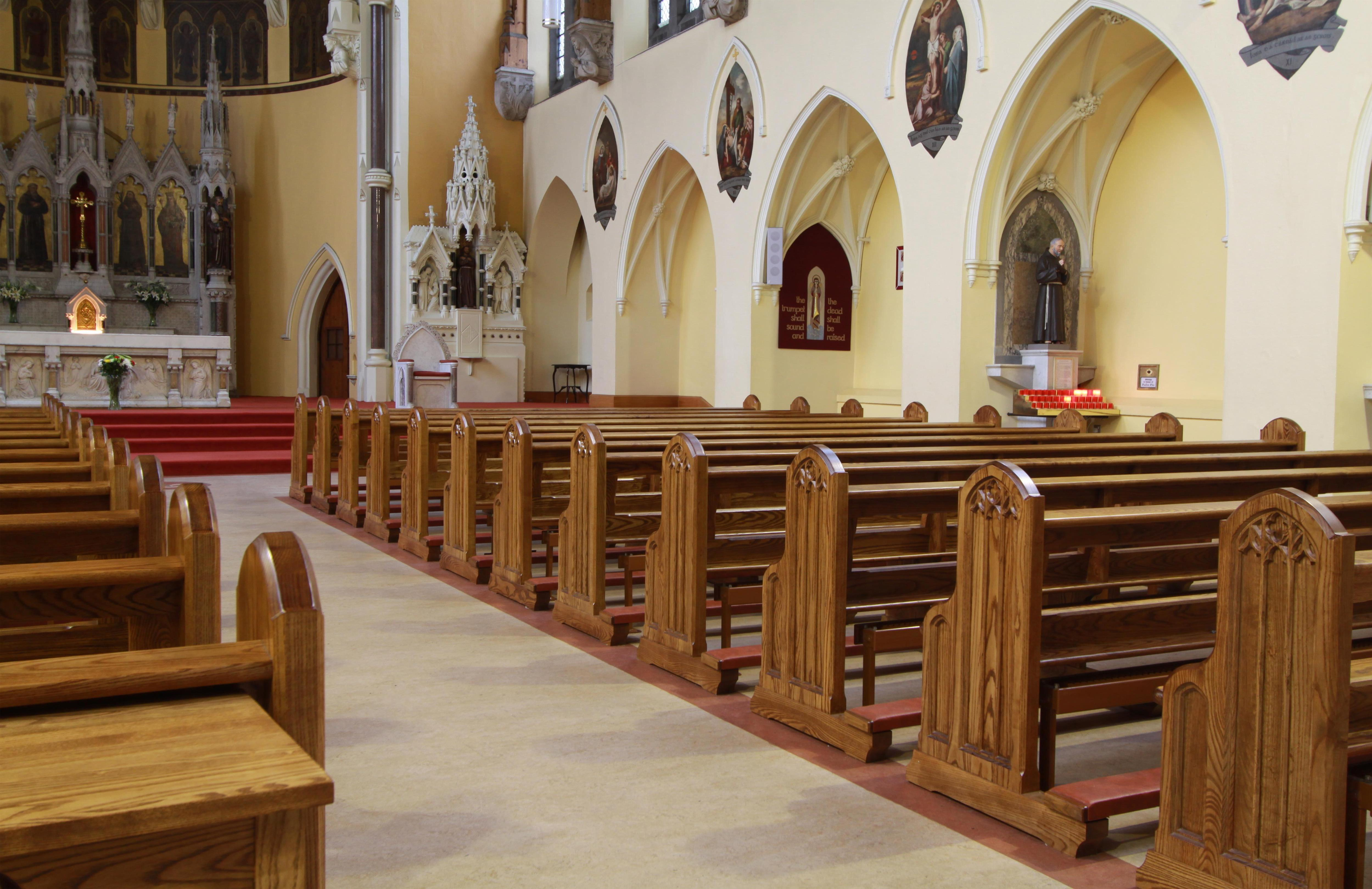
Traditional solid oak church pews with kneelers in a Roman Catholic parish church

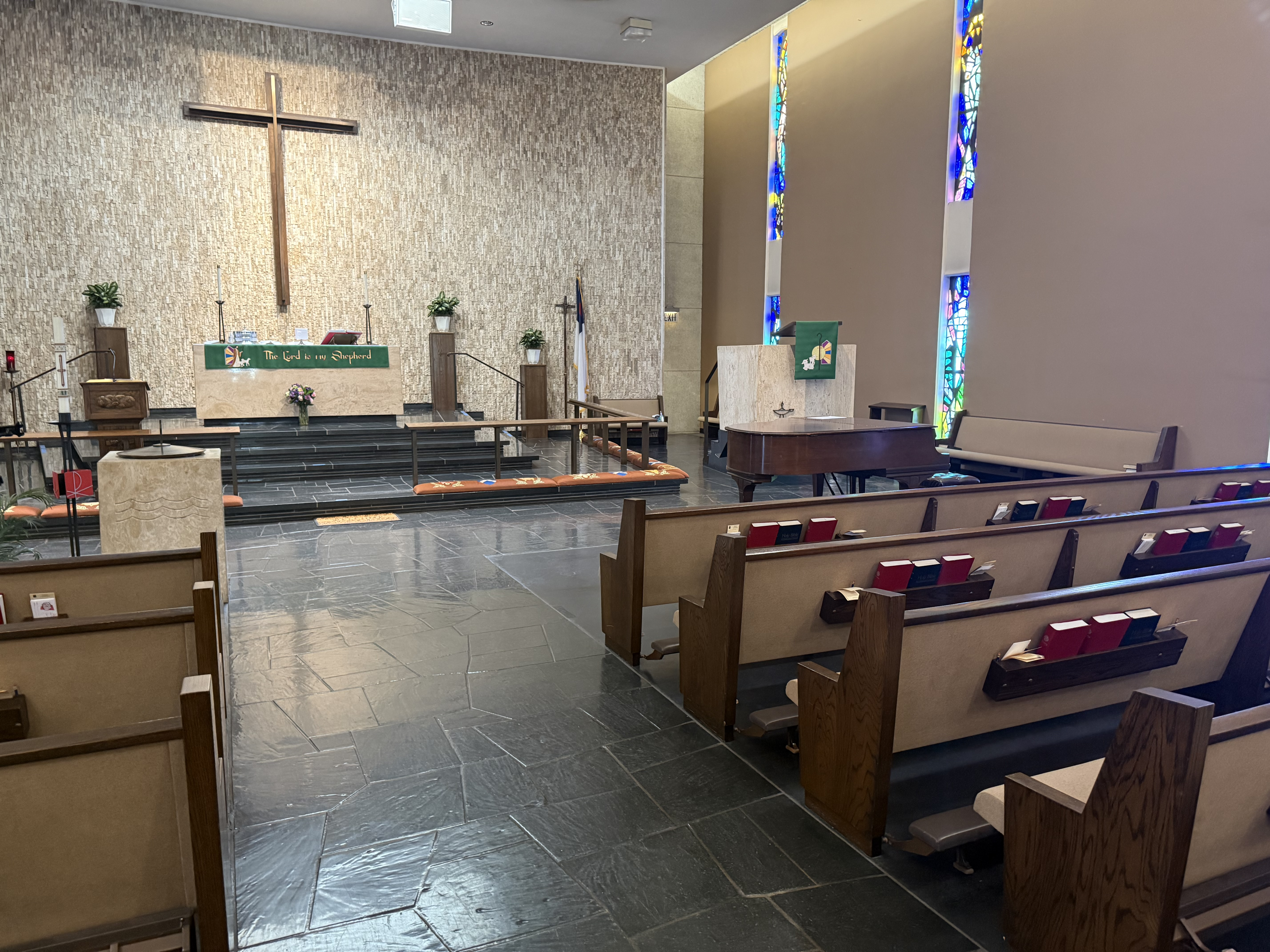
Pews with kneelers at Saint Andrew Lutheran Church in Whittier, California

Pews with padded kneelers in St. Mark's Church (Evangelical-Lutheran) in Björkhagen, Sweden

== See also ==
- Hassock
- Knee pad
