= Oskar Reinhart =

Swiss arts patron and art collector (1885–1965)

- Born: 11 June 1885; Winterthur, Switzerland
- Died: 16 September 1965 (aged 80); Winterthur, Switzerland
- Occupations: Art collector and patron
- Known for: Oskar Reinhart Collection, Museum Oskar Reinhart am Stadtgarten

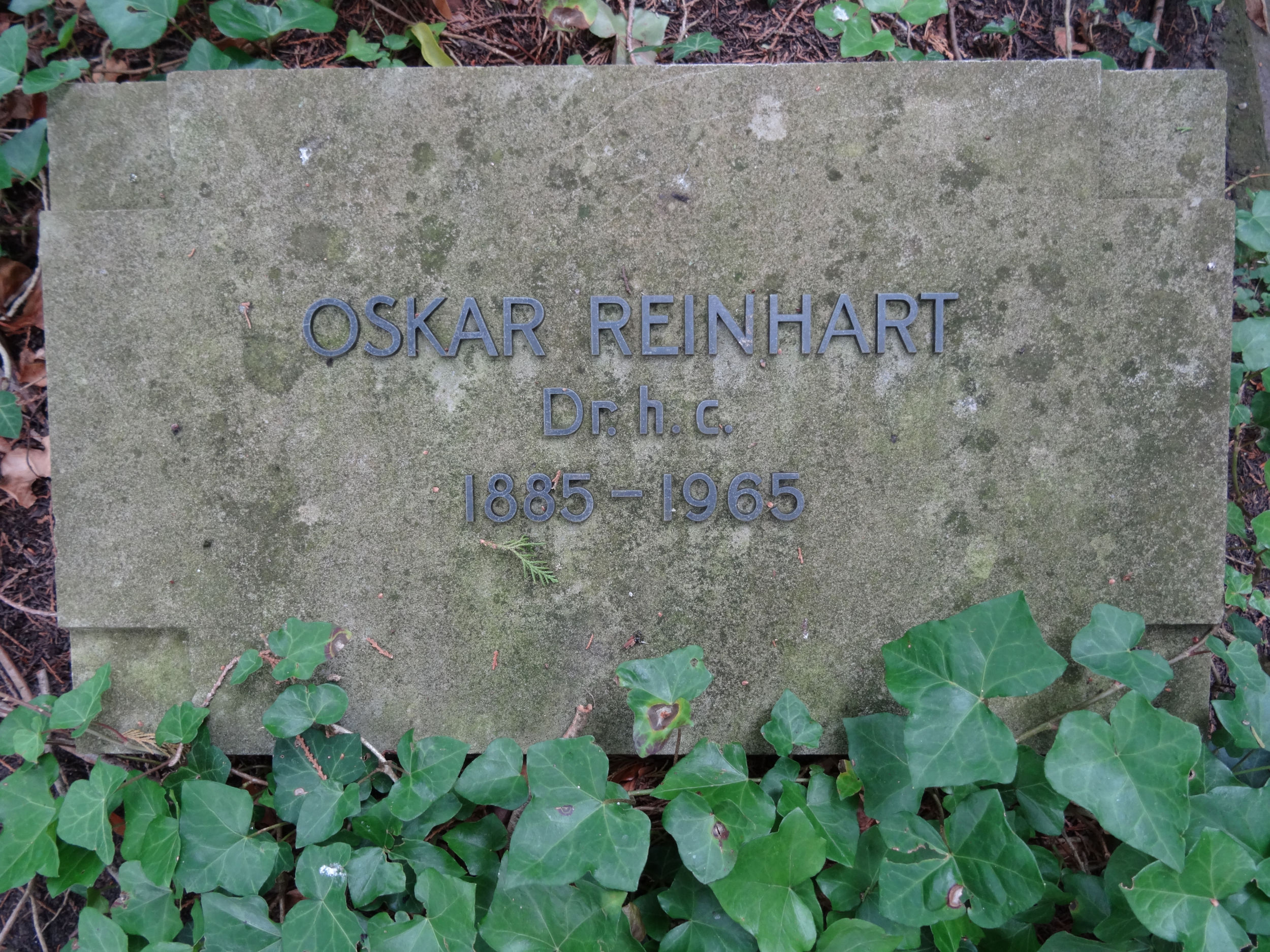
Grave of Oskar Reinhart at Rosenberg Cemetery, Winterthur

Oskar Reinhart (11 June 1885 – 16 September 1965) was a Swiss art collector and patron from Winterthur. After leaving the family business, he collected European art that included Old Masters, French Impressionism and Swiss, German and Austrian painting. His collections are housed at the Museum Oskar Reinhart am Stadtgarten and Villa Am Römerholz.

== Biography ==
Oskar Reinhart was born in Winterthur on 11 June 1885, the son of Theodor Reinhart, a cotton merchant and patron of the arts. He belonged to a prominent Winterthur family that included councillors and judges, and became involved in overseas trade, particularly in cotton. Reinhart grew up at Villa Rychenberg, where art, music and literature were part of family life. His father knew several well-known artists.

His family expected him to pursue a commercial career in the family firm, but in letters to his father Reinhart expressed his wish to devote his life to collecting art instead. After studying in Lausanne, Reinhart entered the family trading firm, training in London in 1907 and working in India from 1909 to 1911. From 1912 to 1924 he was a co-owner of the business. Following the deaths of his mother in 1917 and his father in 1919, his inheritance gave him greater financial independence.

In 1920 he founded the Clubhouse Zur Geduld in Winterthur, which was decorated by Karl Walser and Henry Bischoff. After leaving business in 1924, he devoted himself entirely to collecting art.

Reinhart served on the Swiss Federal Art Commission from 1933 to 1938. He was also appointed to the Gottfried Keller Foundation. He received honorary doctorates from the University of Basel (1932) and the University of Zurich (1951). Reinhart died in Winterthur on 16 September 1965.

== Art collection ==
With financial support from his father, Reinhart began acquiring English prints while working in London in 1907. In 1909 he spent time in Berlin, a formative period for his interest in art, during which he came into contact with Julius Meier-Graefe. Following these influences, Reinhart gave French Impressionists a central place in his acquisitions, while also collecting earlier European masters he viewed as precursors to Impressionism, as well as German and Swiss art. During a journey to Germany and Paris in 1911, he purchased his first painting, Ferdinand Hodler’s Landscape with Poplars.

Reinhart moved to Villa Am Römerholz in 1924. A gallery designed by the villa’s original architect was added to the property and completed in 1925. The collection at Am Römerholz included European paintings from the 14th to early 20th centuries, as well as sculptures. It ranged from Old Masters such as Peter Paul Rubens and Francisco Goya to 19th-century artists including Eugène Delacroix, John Constable, Honoré Daumier, Édouard Manet and Pierre-Auguste Renoir.

== Legacy ==
In October 1940, Reinhart transferred to the city of Winterthur the part of his collection devoted to Swiss, Austrian and German art from the 18th to the early 20th centuries. It was made accessible to the public in 1951 at the Museum Oskar Reinhart am Stadtgarten.

In 1944 Reinhart arranged for Villa Am Römerholz and its collection to pass to the Swiss Confederation after his death. He stipulated that the collection must remain together and could not be altered. In 1970, five years after Reinhart's death, Villa Am Römerholz opened to the public as a museum following alterations to the building.

In 2026, the Swiss Confederation accepted the donation of the former park and bathing complex at Am Römerholz, reuniting it with Reinhart’s former residence. Following conservation work, the complex is intended to be opened gradually to the public and incorporated into the museum’s activities.

== Gallery ==
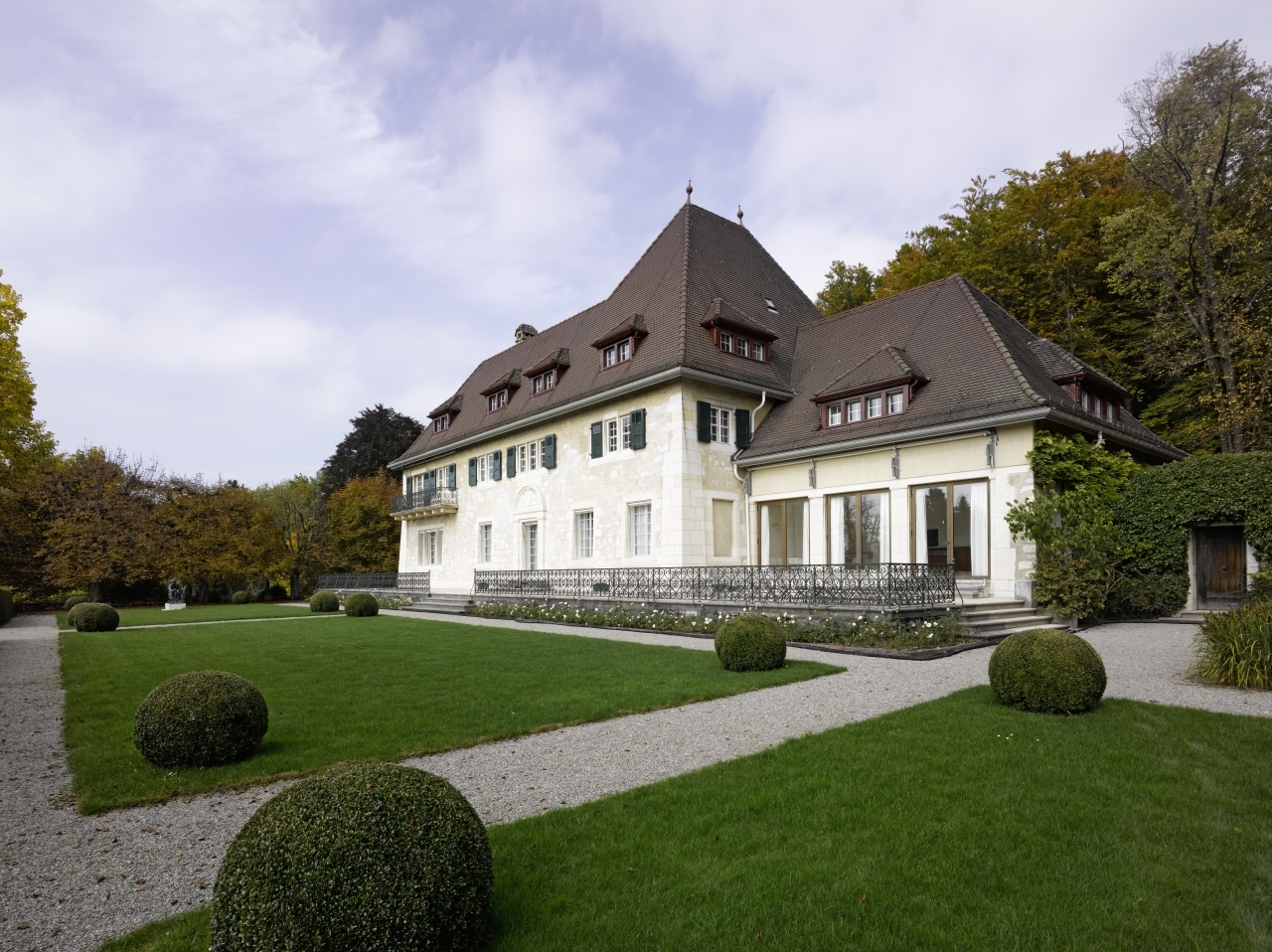
Villa Am Römerholz, home of the Oskar Reinhart Collection

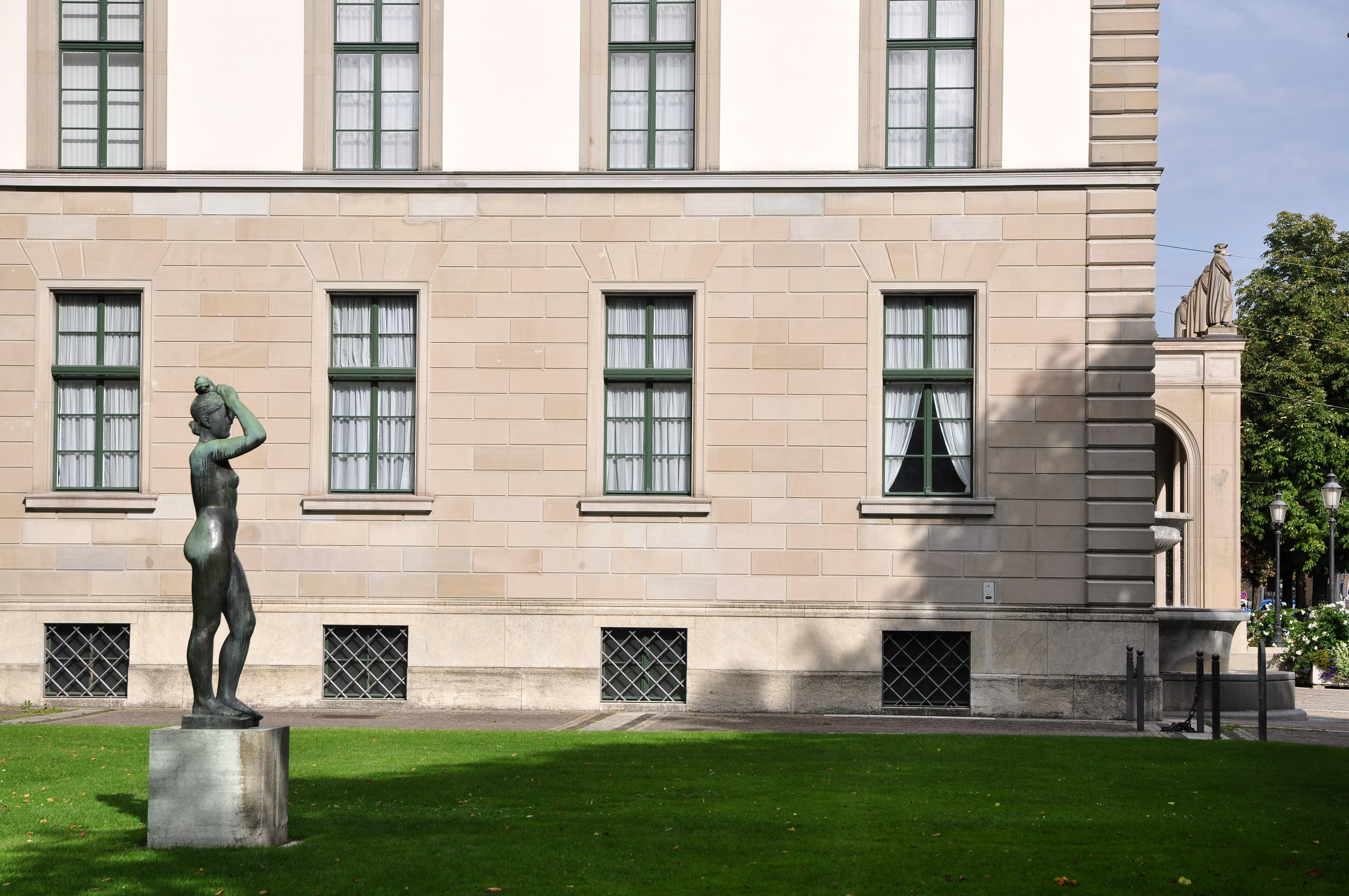
Museum Oskar Reinhart am Stadtgarten

== See also ==
- Emil Georg Bührle
- Swiss art
