= Three Hummocks Islands =

Islands in the Northern Territory, Australia

Coordinates: 12°50′36″S 136°42′07″E

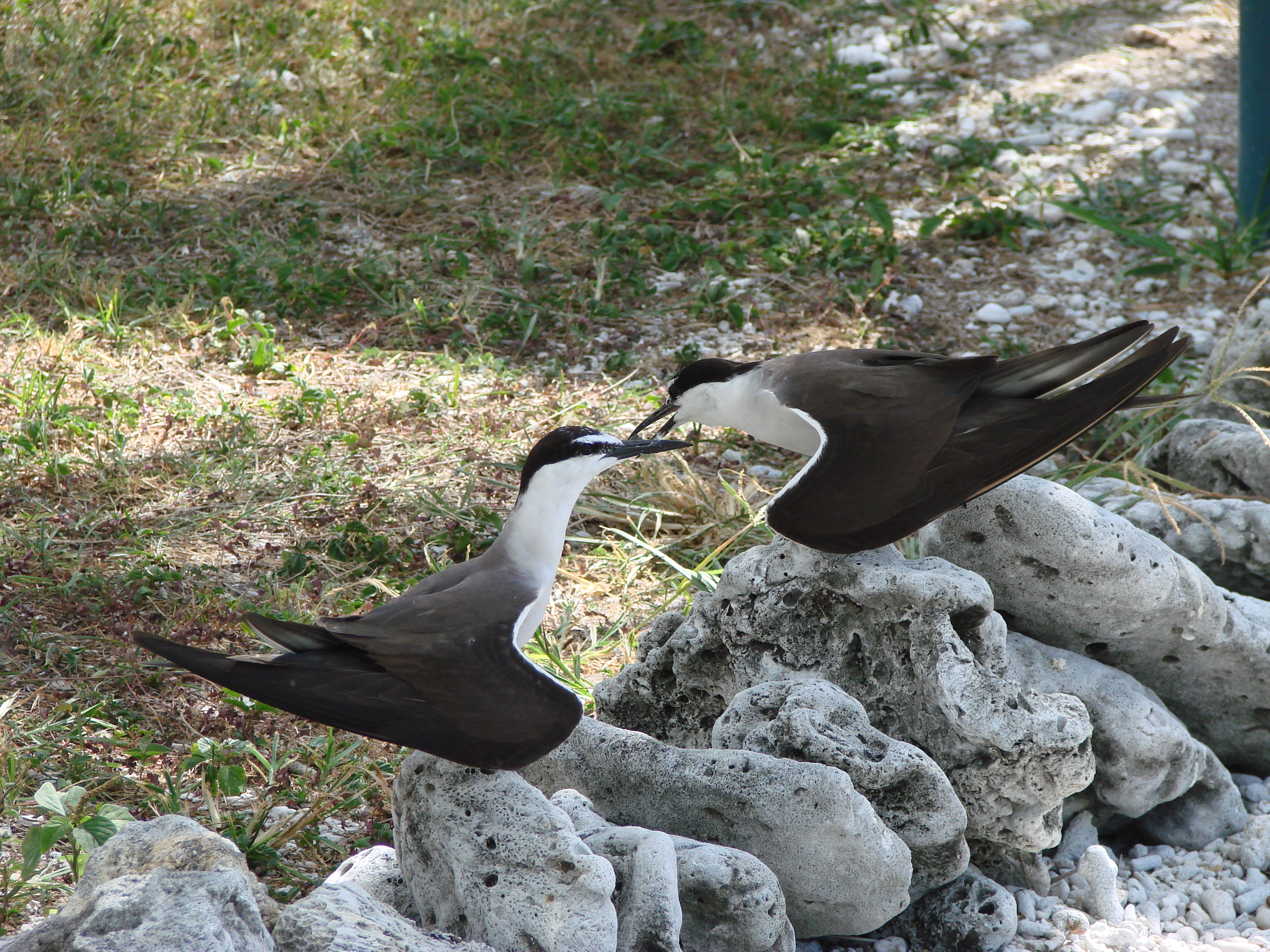
The island group is an important site for breeding bridled terns

The Three Hummocks Islands are a group of small granite islands, with a collective area of 190 ha, lying off the east coast of Arnhem Land’s Gove Peninsula in the north-western Gulf of Carpentaria, in the Northern Territory of Australia. They are important as a nesting site for terns.

== Description ==
The partly vegetated islands lie south of Wanyanmera Point. They fall into two groups, with some unnamed rocky islets to the north, and some relatively larger islands, including Dudley Island, to the south. The islands are traditionally owned Aboriginal land and are part of the Laynhapuy Indigenous Protected Area.

== Birds ==
The island group has been identified as an Important Bird Area (IBA) by BirdLife International because it supports large numbers of breeding bridled terns as well as smaller numbers of other tern species. Estimated numbers of bridled terns nesting in the four years between 1993-1999 when surveys were made varied from 5000 to 50,000. Roseate and black-naped terns nest irregularly on the northern islets while black-naped, bridled and roseate terns have been recorded nesting on Dudley Island.
