= A Lion Attacking a Horse =

Painting by George Stubbs

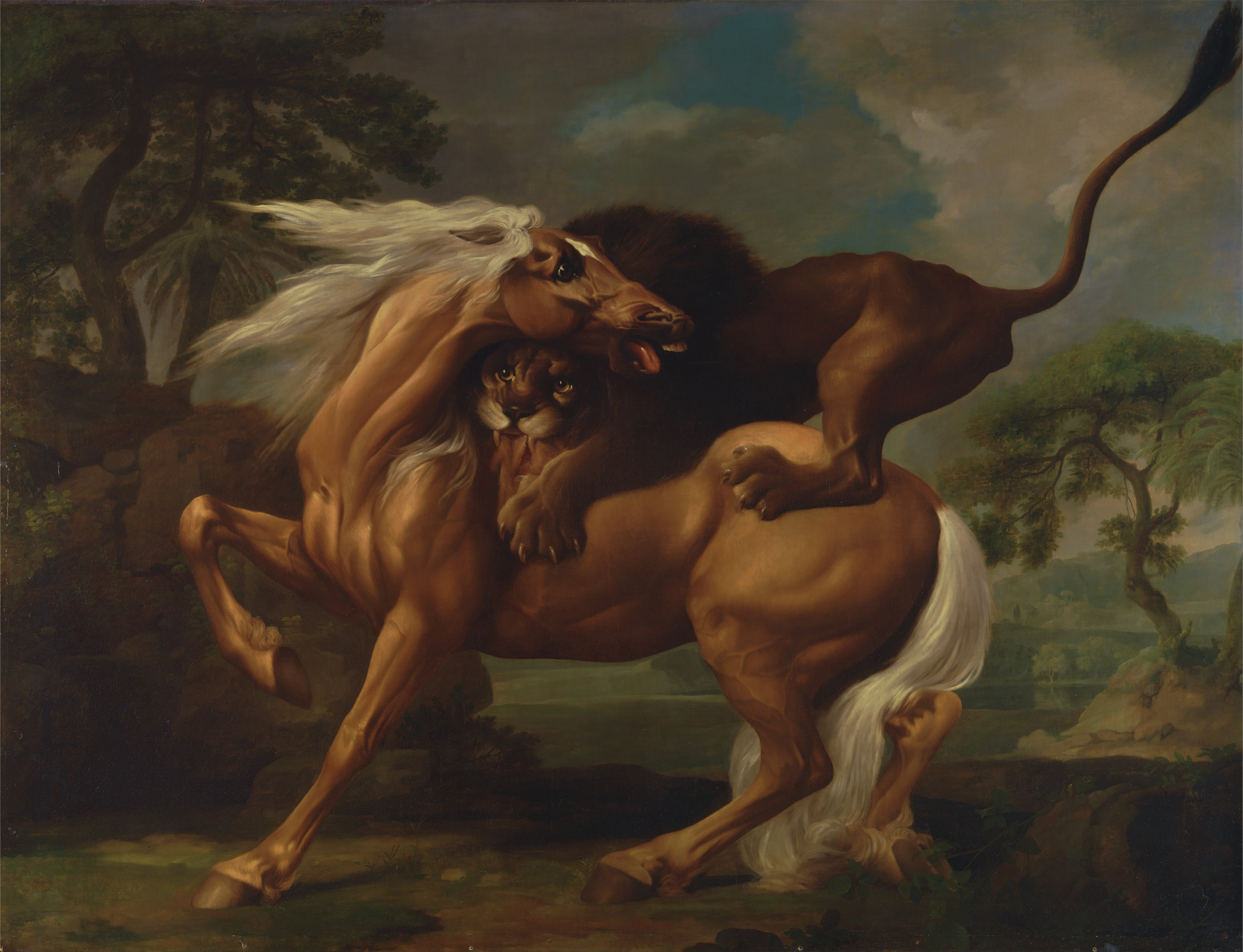
- Artist: George Stubbs
- Year: 1762
- Type: Oil on canvas
- Dimensions: 243.8 cm × 332.7 cm (96.0 in × 131.0 in)
- Location: Yale Center for British Art, New Haven

A Lion Attacking a Horse is the name of an original oil on canvas painting by the English painter George Stubbs, from 1762. Stubbs created a total of 17 paintings on this theme for about thirty years. These paintings all depict a horse being attacked by a lion, which jumps onto its back to sinks its claws into it, while emphasizing the horse's sense of terror and his pain. Apparently inspired by an Italian marble statue, these paintings were widely copied, among others by Théodore Géricault. The original painting is held at the Yale Center for British Art, in New Haven.

== History ==
A tradition states that Stubbs had met a cultivated Moroccan, who invited him to visit his father's castle in Ceuta. During a night walk along the walls of the castle, Stubbs is said to have witnessed the scene of a lion killing a wild horse. This episode is said to have inspired what would be his most dramatic series of paintings and engravings. However, there is no reliable source that corroborates this story, which seems to have been created to explain the origin of these paintings.

The most likely inspiration seems to have been a life-size ancient Roman marble sculpture, considered a must-see by the visitors of Rome, at the time, and well known in the artistic circles of London. Stubbs's fascination, perhaps even obsession, with the scene of a lion attacking a horse is likely a memory of his trip to Italy, when he must have seen this marble group in Rome.

Since the 1760s, Stubbs produced 17 paintings over 30 years, exploring the theme of the horse attacked by a lion. He followed a similar tradition initiated by Peter Paul Rubens, depicting attacks by tigers and lions, who had also been inspired by the Greco-Roman artistic heritage.

== Description ==
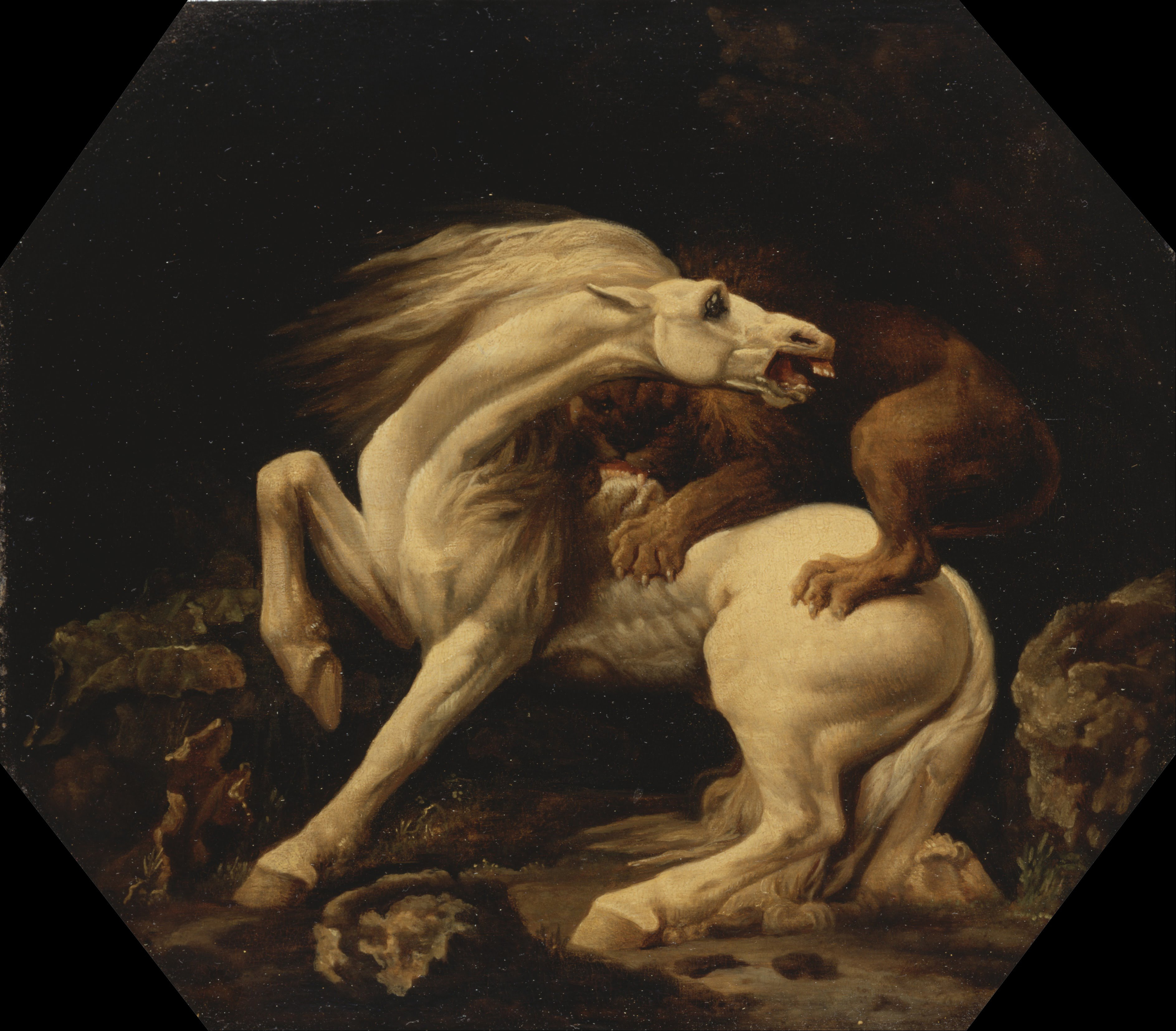
A Lion Attacking a Horse (1768-1769 version)

Starting by the original version, in 1762, all the 17 versions share some common features, despite slight differences between them. They depict the attack of an aggressive lion who is perched on a horse, digging its claws into the skin of its back. The lion has an ambiguous expression, due to its eyes being turned towards the viewer. The surrounding vegetation is typical of a European landscape.

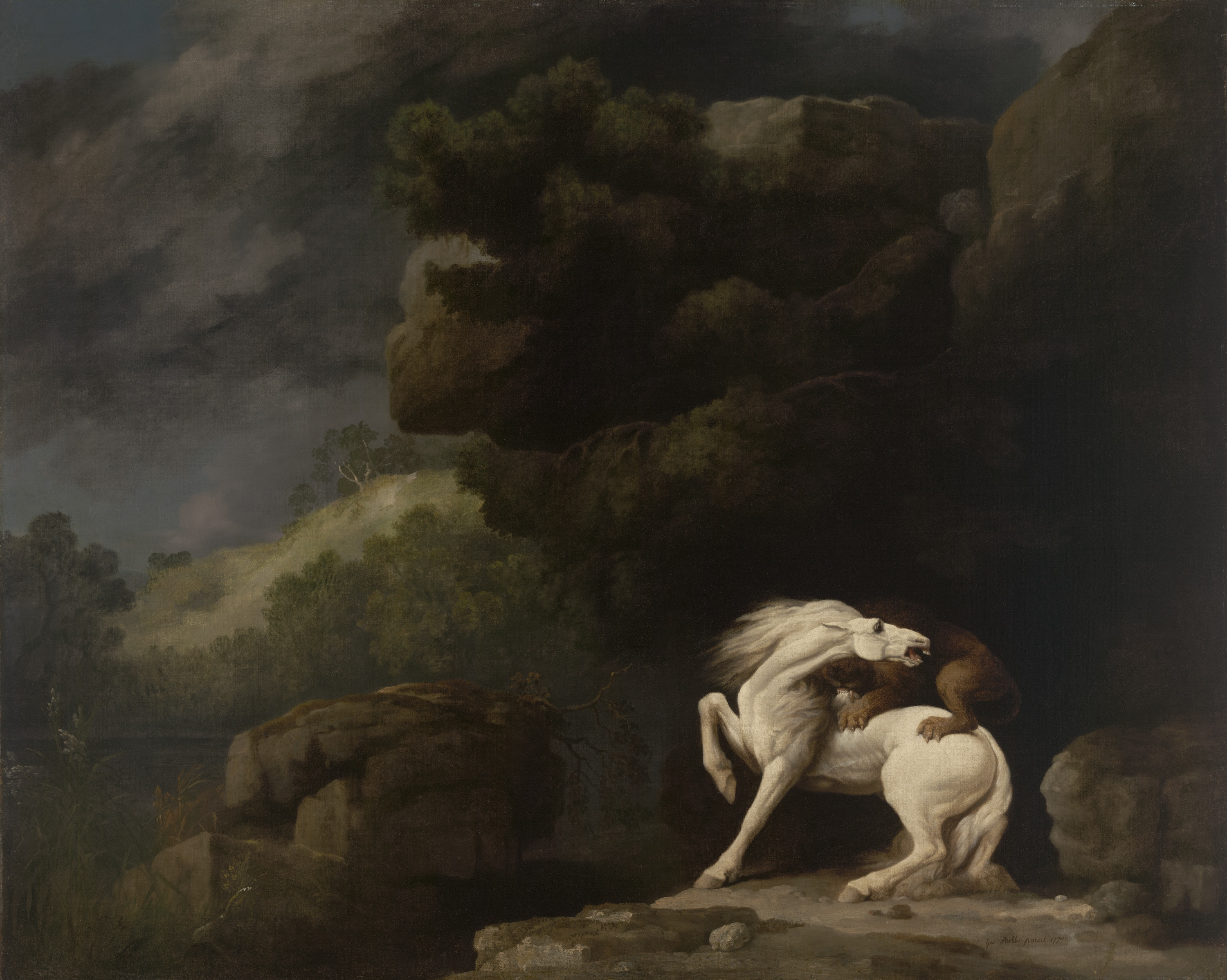
A Lion Attacking a Horse (1770)

The 1765 and 1768-1769 versions attributes more human emotions to the animals, depicting a dying white horse with its mouth open, teeth bared, its head turned towards its attacker, and a body position denoting terror and surprise. The muscular effort made by the lion to hold its position is emphasized.

The 1770 version, now also at the Yale Center for British Art, presents a larger, melodramatic landscape as the background of the scene.

== Analysis ==
According to Diana Donald, Stubbs's paintings show four stages of the lion's attack, and were made with the aim of depicting the ferocity of nature. They are also a way of embodying human qualities through heroic representations of wild, irrational animals. Stubbs's paintings combine a classical style with an explosion of violence, in a monumental register that was then completely new, seeming to anticipate Romanticism.

The subject of these paintings was copied extensively by other artists. Théodore Géricault was inspired and made several copies of this work.
