= The Melancholic Man =

Portrait by Théodore Géricault

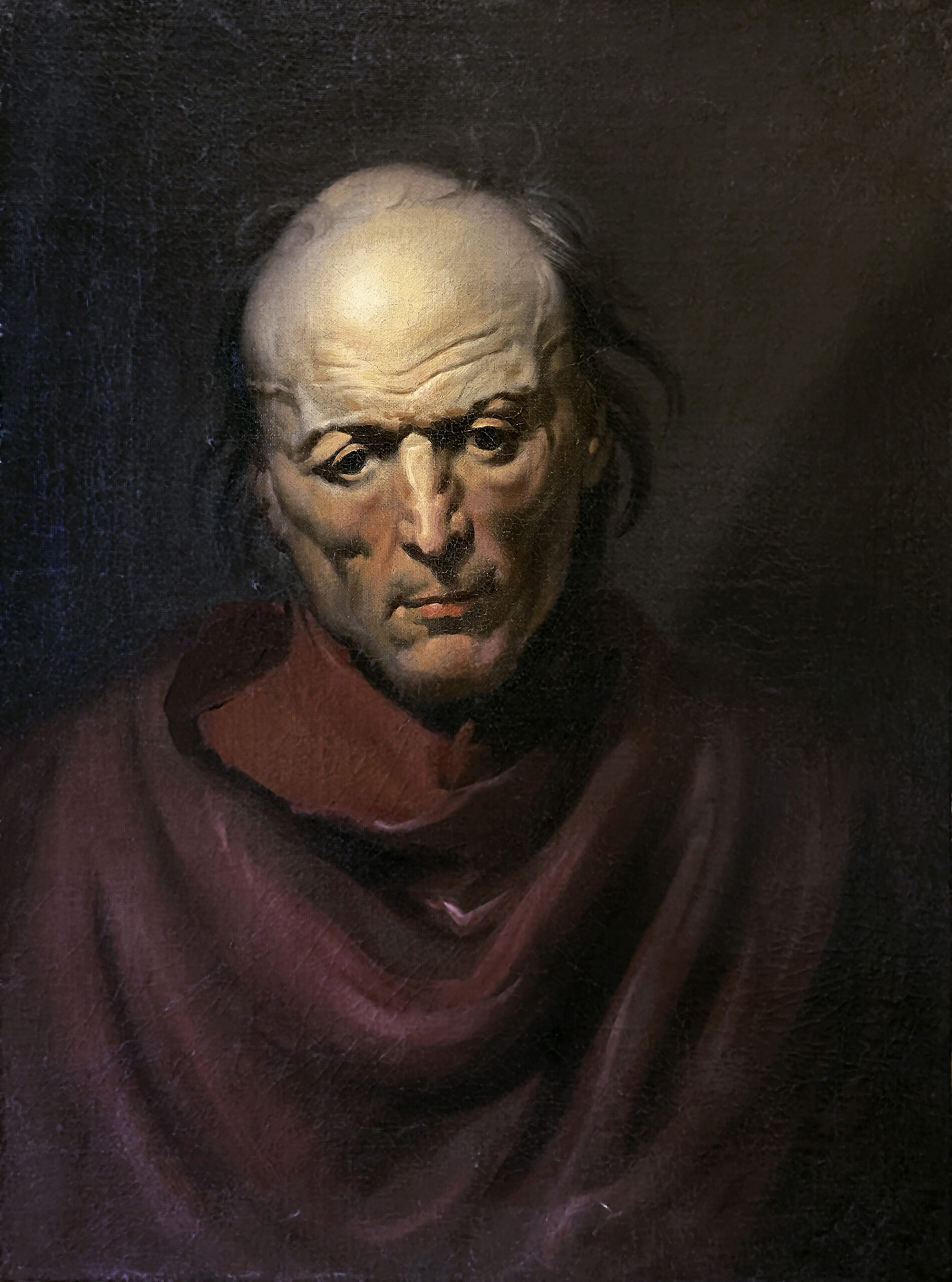
- Artist: attributed to Théodore Géricault
- Year: c. 1820-1823
- Location: Private collection; Ravenna

The Melancholic Man (French: L'homme mélancolique) is an oil-on-canvas painting discovered by Javier S. Burgos, a Spanish scientist, in Ravenna, Emilia-Romagna, Italy in 2019. It depicts a man with a furrowed brow, dressed in a red robe.

Burgos believes it to be by Théodore Géricault, painted as part of the series Les Monomanes (Portraits of the Insane), created between 1821 and 1824. If this identification is correct, it would be the sixth painting of the series to be discovered, representing a melancholic man. This attribution has been contested by several specialists of Géricault.
