= The 1821 Derby at Epsom =

Painting by Théodore Géricault

Le Derby d'Epsom
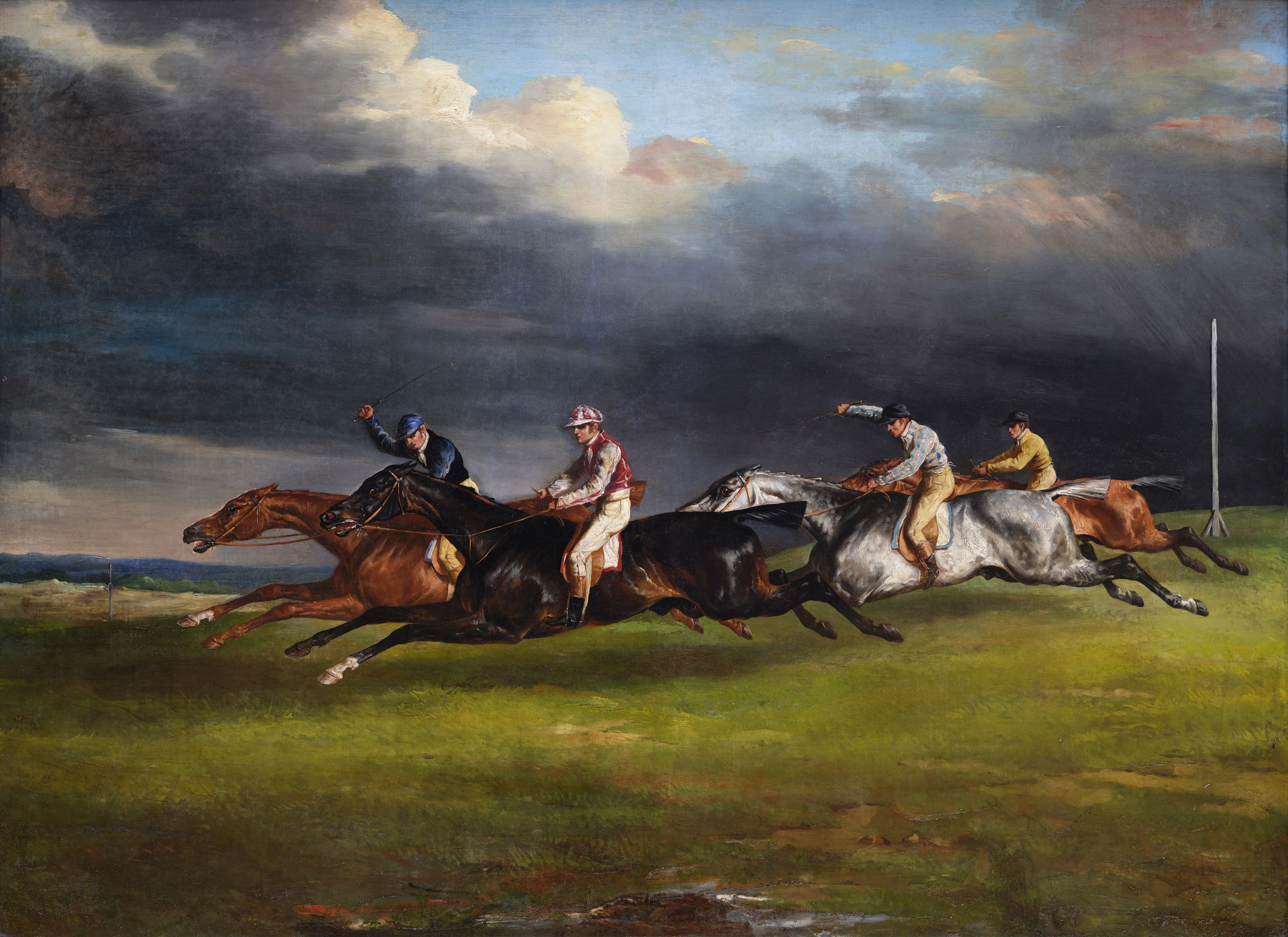
- Artist: Théodore Géricault
- Year: 1821
- Type: Oil painting
- Dimensions: 92 cm × 123 cm (36 in × 48 in)
- Location: Louvre; Paris

The 1821 Derby at Epsom, or Horse Race (Course de chevaux, traditionally called Le Derby de 1821 à Epsom) is an 1821 painting by the French artist Théodore Géricault in the Louvre Museum, showing The Derby of that year.

== History and description ==
Fascinated by horses, Géricault made many paintings portraying them. Working for a while at the imperial stables at Versailles, he had the opportunity to study them in detail and made numerous portraits of horses. Other paintings of horses by Géricault include Officer Hunter Horse of the Imperial Guard Charging (1812) and Race of Free Horses in Rome (1819).

This work is a rare and valuable example of painting dated from his travel in England, when Géricault preferred to work in lithography. It was painted for the English horse dealer Adam Elmore. The race itself was won by Gustavus, becoming the first grey to win the race. The painting was acquired by the Musée du Louvre in 1866.

The position of the horses' legs in the painting – with both front and hind legs extended outwards while airborne – is never actually exhibited by a galloping horse. This was conclusively demonstrated by Eadweard Muybridge in 1878, with high-speed photography showing that galloping horses are airborne when their legs are beneath the body, just before the hind legs touch ground.
