= Evening: Landscape with an Aqueduct =

Painting by Théodore Géricault

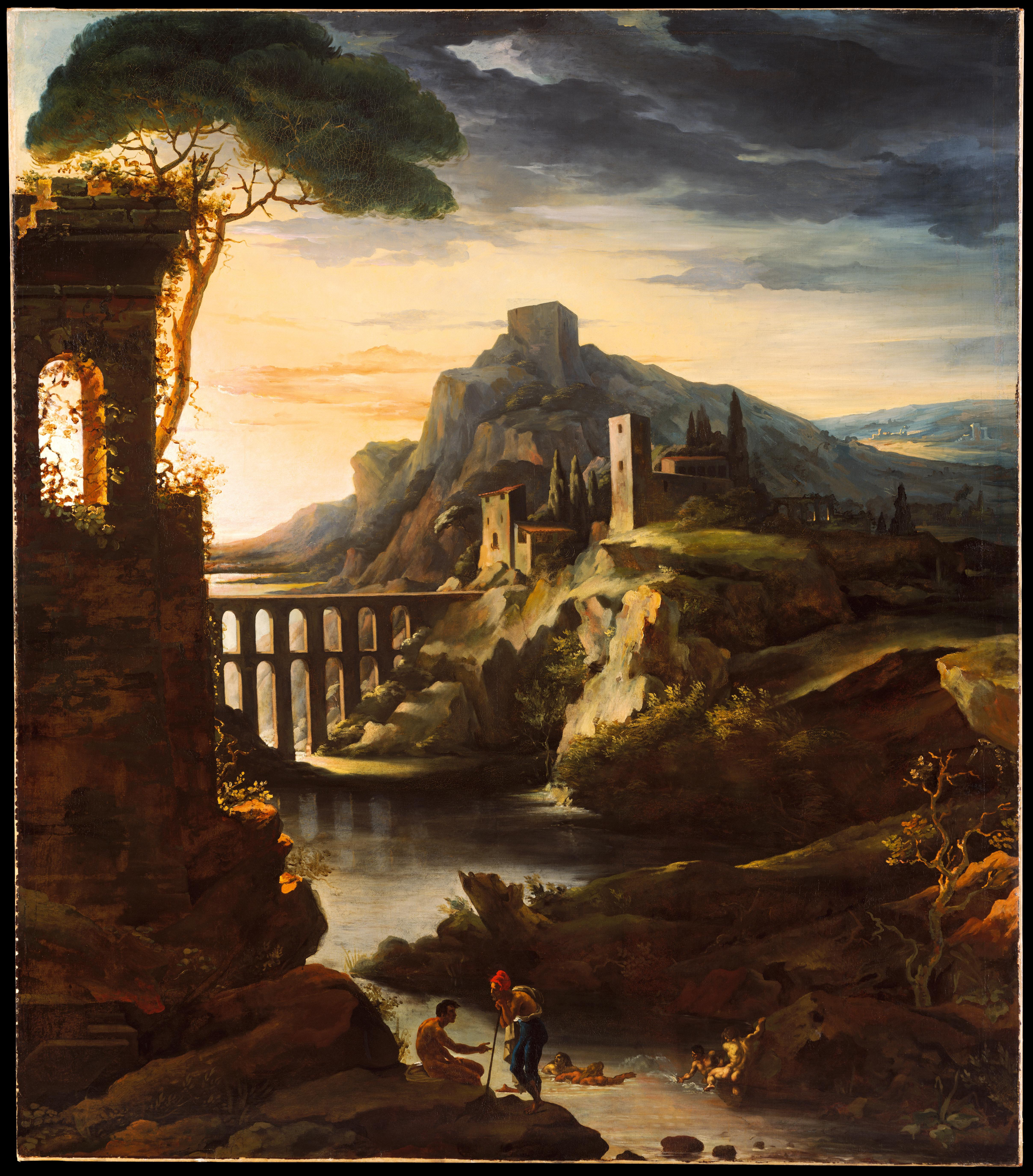
- Artist: Théodore Géricault
- Year: 1818
- Type: Oil on canvas, landscape
- Dimensions: 250.2 cm × 219.7 cm (98.5 in × 86.5 in)
- Location: Metropolitan Museum of Art; New York City

Evening: Landscape with an Aqueduct is an 1818 landscape painting by the French artist Théodore Géricault.

It was one of three monumental landscapes showing various times of the day (a planned fourth was not produced). Géricault combines a view of the aqueduct of Spoleto which he had visited in 1817, with the stormy skies and turbulent moods of the developing romantic movement. It is in the collection of the Metropolitan Museum of Art in New York City.

== Bibliography ==
- Crow, Thomas. Restoration: The Fall of Napoleon in the Course of European Art, 1812-1820. Princeton University Press, 2023.
- Noon, Patrick & Bann, Stephen. Constable to Delacroix: British Art and the French Romantics. Tate, 2003.
- Tinterow, Gary. Gericault's Heroic Landscapes: The Times of Day. Metropolitan Museum of Art, 1990.
