= Portrait of Théodore Géricault =

Painting by Horace Vernet

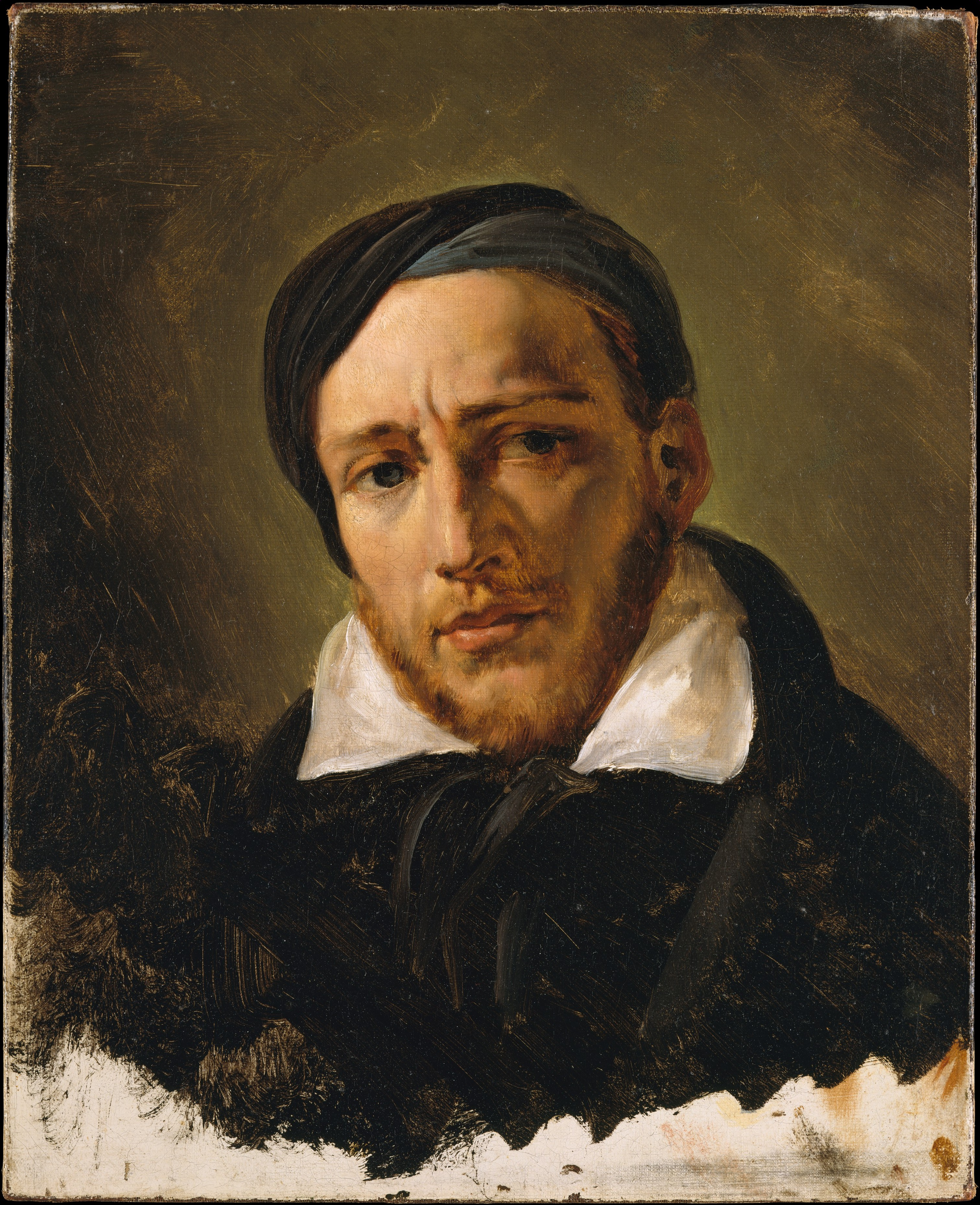
- Artist: Horace Vernet
- Year: c.1823
- Type: Oil on canvas, portrait painting
- Dimensions: 47.3 cm × 38.4 cm (18.6 in × 15.1 in)
- Location: Metropolitan Museum of Art; New York City

Portrait of Théodore Géricault is an 1823 portrait painting by the French artist Horace Vernet depicting his friend and fellow painter Théodore Géricault.

Best known for his 1819 painting The Raft of the Medusa, Géricault was a prominent figure in the rising movement of Romanticism before his death from consumption in 1824. While most depictions of Géricault were posthumous such as Ary Scheffer's The Death of Géricault, it is likely Vernet painted this in February 1823. Today the painting is in the Metropolitan Museum of Art in New York City, having been acquired in 1988. Around the same time Vernet also produced a full-length lithograph of Géricault.

== Bibliography ==
- Baum, Kelly, Bayer, Andrea & Wagstaff, Sheena. Unfinished: Thoughts Left Visible. Metropolitan Museum of Art, 2016.
- Harkett, Daniel & Hornstein, Katie (ed.) Horace Vernet and the Thresholds of Nineteenth-Century Visual Culture. Dartmouth College Press, 2017.
- Noon, Patrick & Bann, Stephen. Constable to Delacroix: British Art and the French Romantics. Tate, 2003.
