= A Charge of Cuirassiers =

Painting by Théodore Géricault

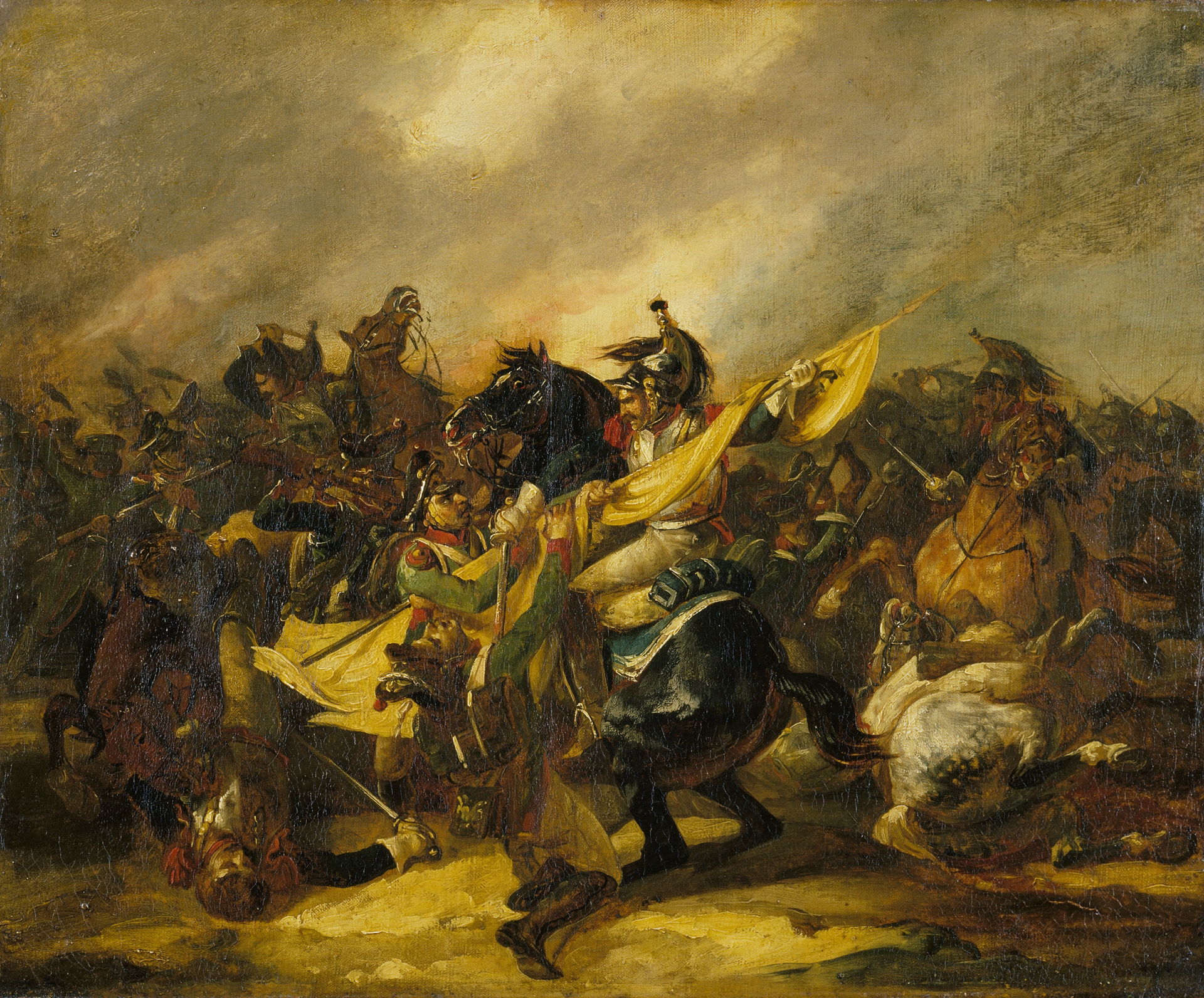
- Artist: Théodore Géricault
- Year: c.1823
- Type: Oil on canvas, history painting
- Dimensions: 38.1 cm × 45.8 cm (15.0 in × 18.0 in)
- Location: Wallace Collection; London

A Charge of Cuirassiers is an 1823 history painting by the French artist Théodore Géricault. It portrays a battle scene from the Napoleonic Wars as charging French cuirassiers seize a regimental colour from Russian infantry. Battle scenes remained popular in the decades after the fighting ceased in 1815, with Géricault's friend Horace Vernet producing a large number. Today the painting is in Wallace Collection in London, having been purchased by the Marquess of Hertford in 1857 in Paris.

== Bibliography ==
- Bazin, Germain. Théodore Géricault: La Gloire de L'empire et la première restauration. Bibliothèque des Arts, 1987.
- Hannoosh, Michèle. Jules Michelet: Writing Art and History in Nineteenth-Century France. Penn State Press, 2019.
- Ingamells, John. The Wallace Collection: French Nineteenth Century. Trustees of the Wallace Collection, 1985.
