= Théodore Géricault =

French painter (1791–1824)

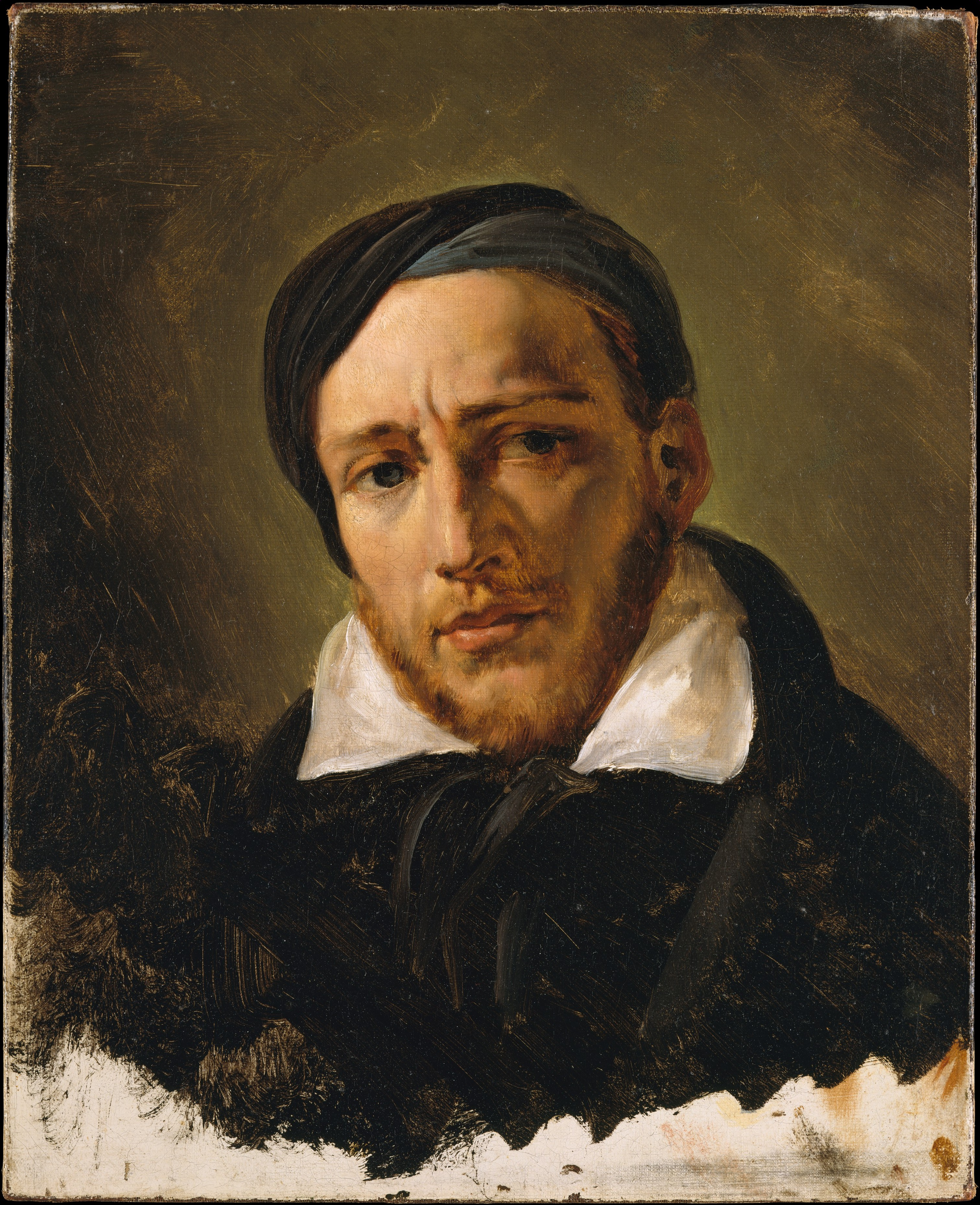
- Portrait of Théodore Géricault by Horace Vernet, c. 1822–1823
- Born: Jean-Louis André Théodore Géricault; 26 September 1791; Rouen, Normandy, France
- Died: 26 January 1824 (aged 32); Paris, France
- Known for: Painting, lithography
- Notable work: The Raft of the Medusa
- Movement: Romanticism

Jean-Louis André Théodore Géricault (French: [ʒɑ̃lwi ɑ̃dʁe teɔdɔʁ ʒeʁiko]; 26 September 1791 – 26 January 1824) was a French painter and lithographer. His best-known painting is The Raft of the Medusa. Despite his short life, he was one of the pioneers of the Romantic movement.

== Early life ==
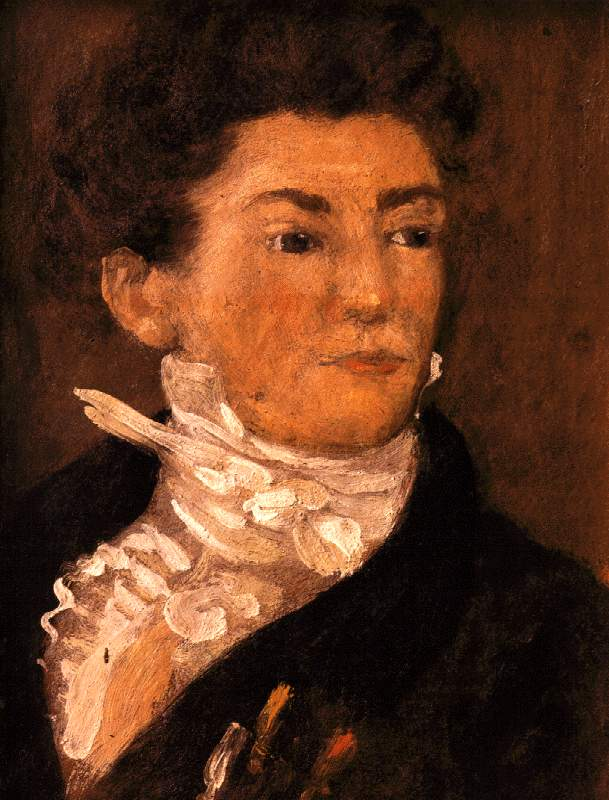
Self-portrait, c. 1808–1812

Born in Rouen, France, Géricault moved to Paris with his family, probably in 1797, where Théodore's father, a lawyer, worked in the family tobacco business based at the Hôtel de Longueville on the Place du Carrousel. Géricault's artistic abilities were likely first recognized by the painter and art dealer Jean-Louis Laneuville. Laneuville lived at the Hotel de Longueville alongside Jean-Baptiste Caruel, Théodore Géricault's maternal uncle, and other members of the extended Géricault family.

== Saint Domingue & the Musée français ==
In 1797, Théodore Géricault's Saint Domingue relation Louis Robillard de Peronville arrived in Paris with his family, having fled war and revolution in France's Caribbean colony. In 1802, with France once more at peace, Robillard de Peronville and Pierre Laurent, an engraver, founded the Entreprise De La Gravure De La Galerie du Musée Central des Arts à Paris - a private business partnership producing high-quality engravings of paintings, sculptures, and bas-reliefs in the national museum at the Louvre for a domestic and international clientele. Géricault's family circle embraced the Musée Français, as the enterprise was known, thus providing Géricault with a rare education in the production and history of art during this critical period in his young life.

In 1808, Géricault began training at the studio of Carle Vernet, where he was educated in the tradition of English sporting art. In 1810, Géricault began studying classical figure composition under Pierre-Narcisse Guérin, a rigorous classicist who disapproved of his student's impulsive temperament while recognizing his talent. Géricault soon left the classroom, choosing to study at the Louvre, where from 1810 to 1815 he copied paintings by Rubens, Titian, Velázquez and Rembrandt.

During this period at the Louvre he discovered a vitality he found lacking in the prevailing school of Neoclassicism. Much of his time was spent in Versailles, where he found the stables of the palace open to him, and where he gained his knowledge of the anatomy and action of horses.

== Success ==
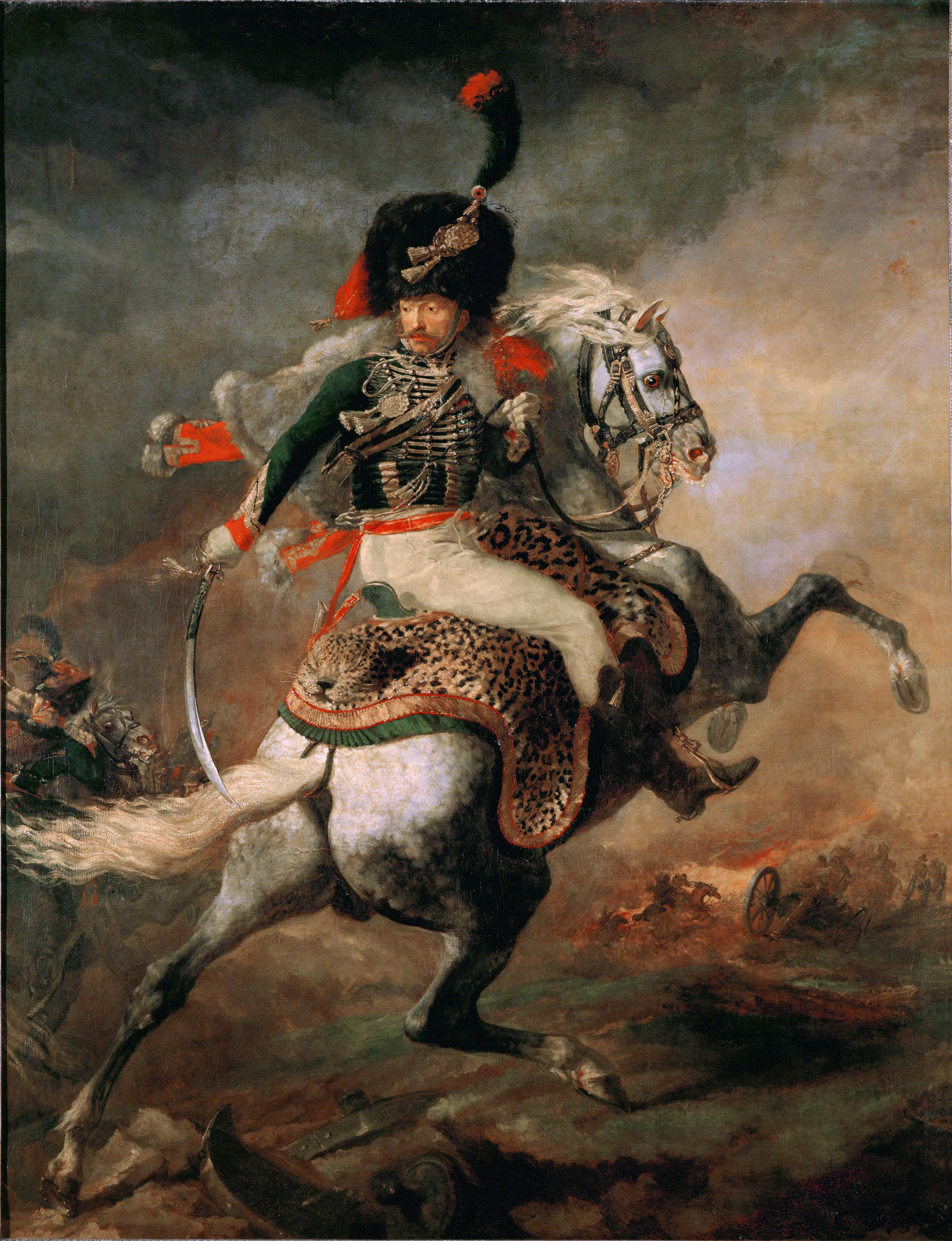
The Charging Chasseur, 1812

Géricault's first major work, The Charging Chasseur, exhibited at the Paris Salon of 1812, revealed the influence of the style of Rubens and an interest in the depiction of contemporary subject matter. This youthful success, ambitious and monumental, was followed by a change in direction: for the next several years Géricault produced a series of small studies of horses and cavalrymen.

He exhibited Wounded Cuirassier at the Salon of 1814, a work more labored and less well received. Géricault in a fit of disappointment entered the army and served for a time in the garrison of Versailles. In the nearly two years that followed the 1814 Salon, he also underwent a self-imposed study of figure construction and composition, all the while evidencing a personal predilection for drama and expressive force. The studies and finished drawings from this time attest to Géricault's immersion in military and Napoleonic subjects in his early career, fascination with the anatomy and movement of horses, and attraction to Oriental subjects, particularly scenes of mounted warriors.

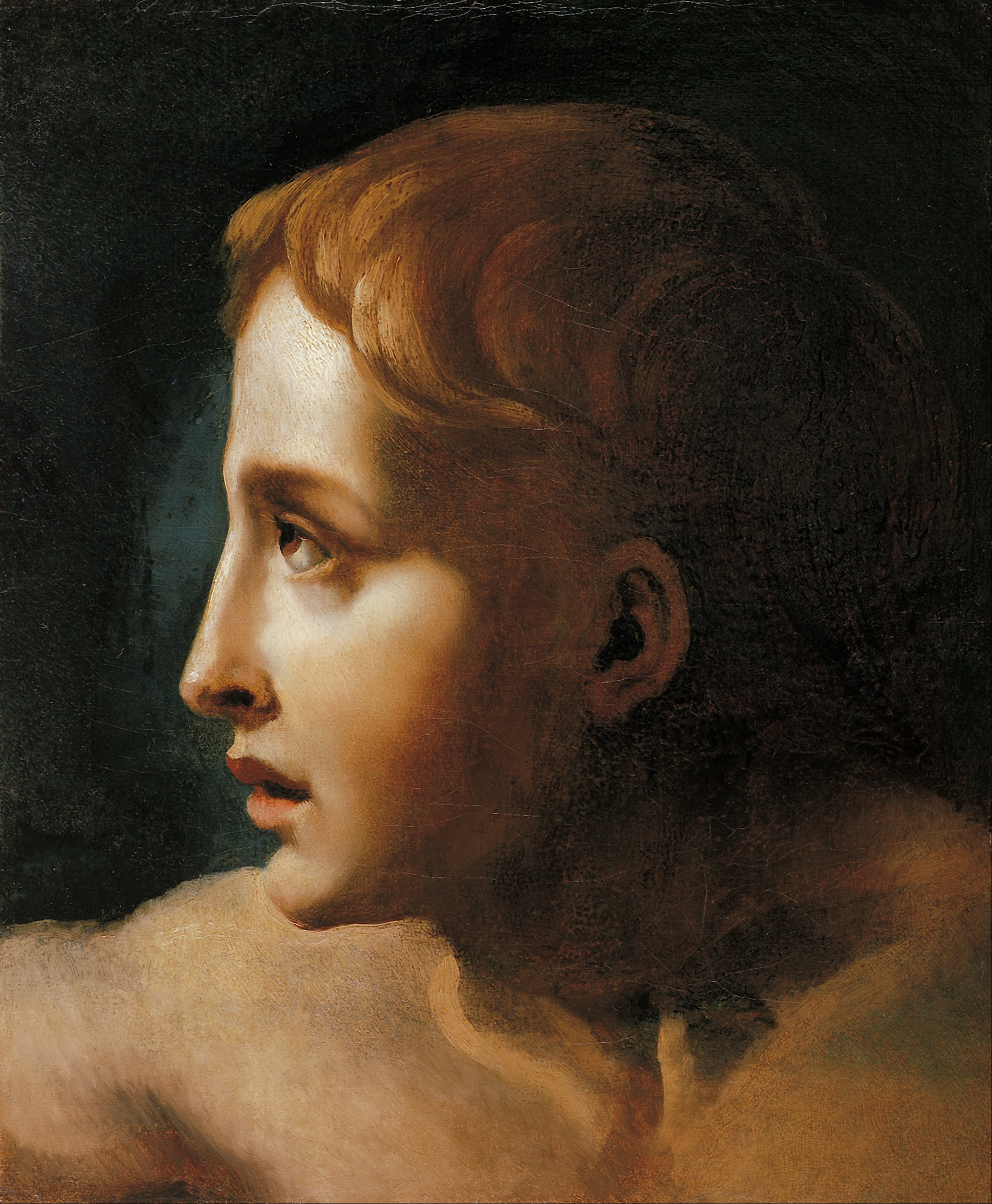
Study of the Head of a Youth, c. 1821–1824

A trip to Florence, Rome, and Naples (1816–17), prompted in part by the desire to flee from a romantic entanglement with his aunt, ignited a fascination with Michelangelo. Rome itself inspired the preparation of a monumental canvas, the Race of the Barberi Horses, a work of epic composition and abstracted theme that promised to be "entirely without parallel in its time". However, Géricault never completed the painting and returned to France.

== The Raft of the Medusa ==
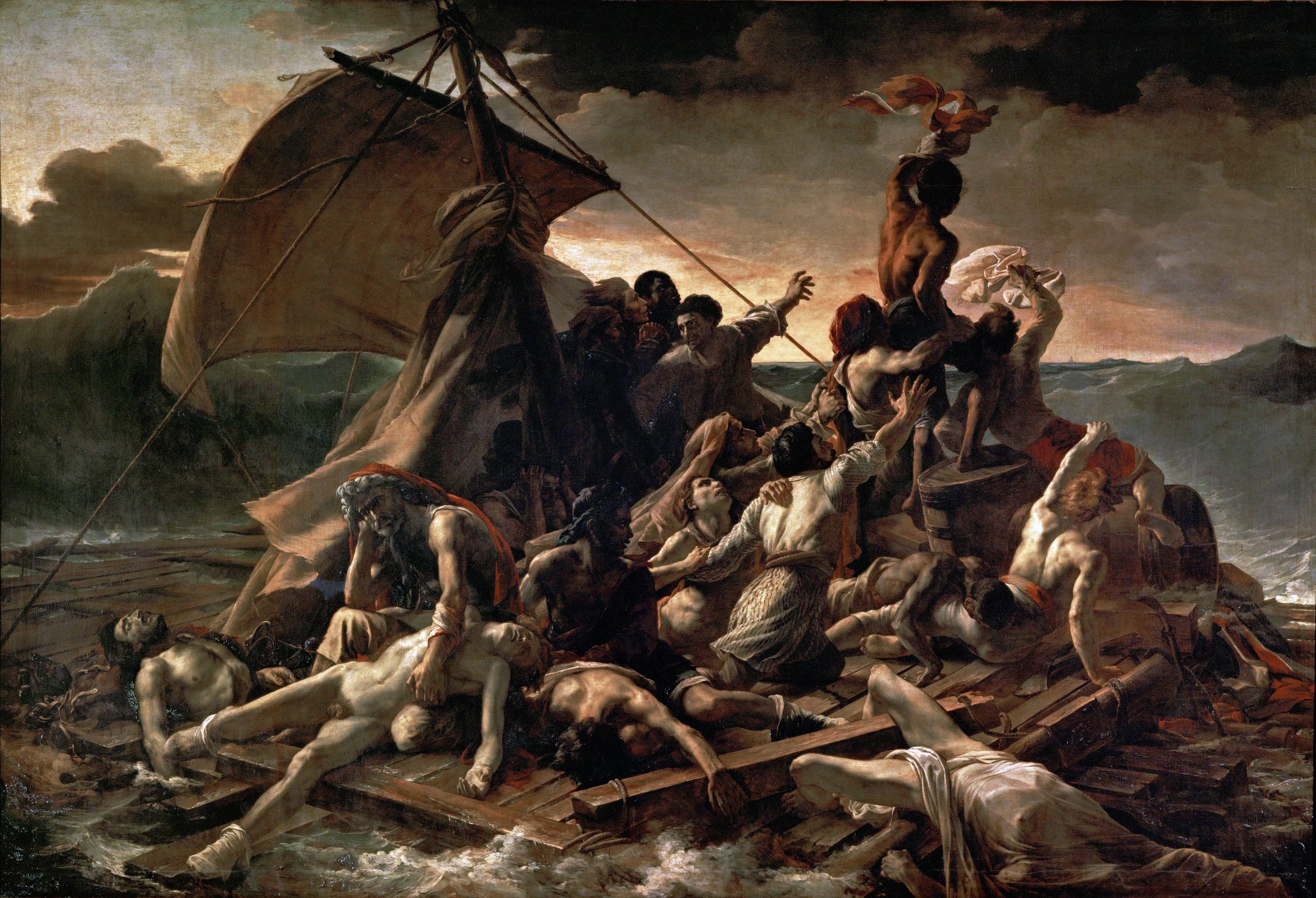
The Raft of the Medusa, 1819

Géricault continually returned to the military themes of his early paintings, and the series of lithographs he undertook on military subjects after his return from Italy are considered some of the earliest masterworks in that medium. Perhaps his most significant, and certainly most ambitious work, is The Raft of the Medusa (1818–19), which depicted the aftermath of a contemporary French shipwreck, Méduse, in which the captain had left the crew and passengers to die.

The incident became a national scandal, and Géricault's dramatic interpretation presented a contemporary tragedy on a monumental scale. The painting's notoriety stemmed from its indictment of a corrupt establishment, but it also dramatized a more eternal theme, that of man's struggle with nature. Eugène Delacroix, a contemporary painter, posed for one of the dying figures.

The classical depiction of the figures and structure of the composition stand in contrast to the turbulence of the subject, so that the painting constitutes an important bridge between neo-classicism and romanticism. It fuses many influences: the Last Judgment of Michelangelo, the monumental approach to contemporary events by Antoine-Jean Gros, figure groupings by Henry Fuseli, and possibly the painting Watson and the Shark by John Singleton Copley.

The painting ignited political controversy when first exhibited at the Paris Salon of 1819; it then traveled to England in 1820, accompanied by Géricault himself, where it received much praise.

While in London, Géricault witnessed urban poverty, made drawings of his impressions, and published lithographs based on these observations which were free of sentimentality. He associated much there with Charlet, the lithographer and caricaturist. In 1821, while still in England, he painted The Derby of Epsom.

== Later life ==
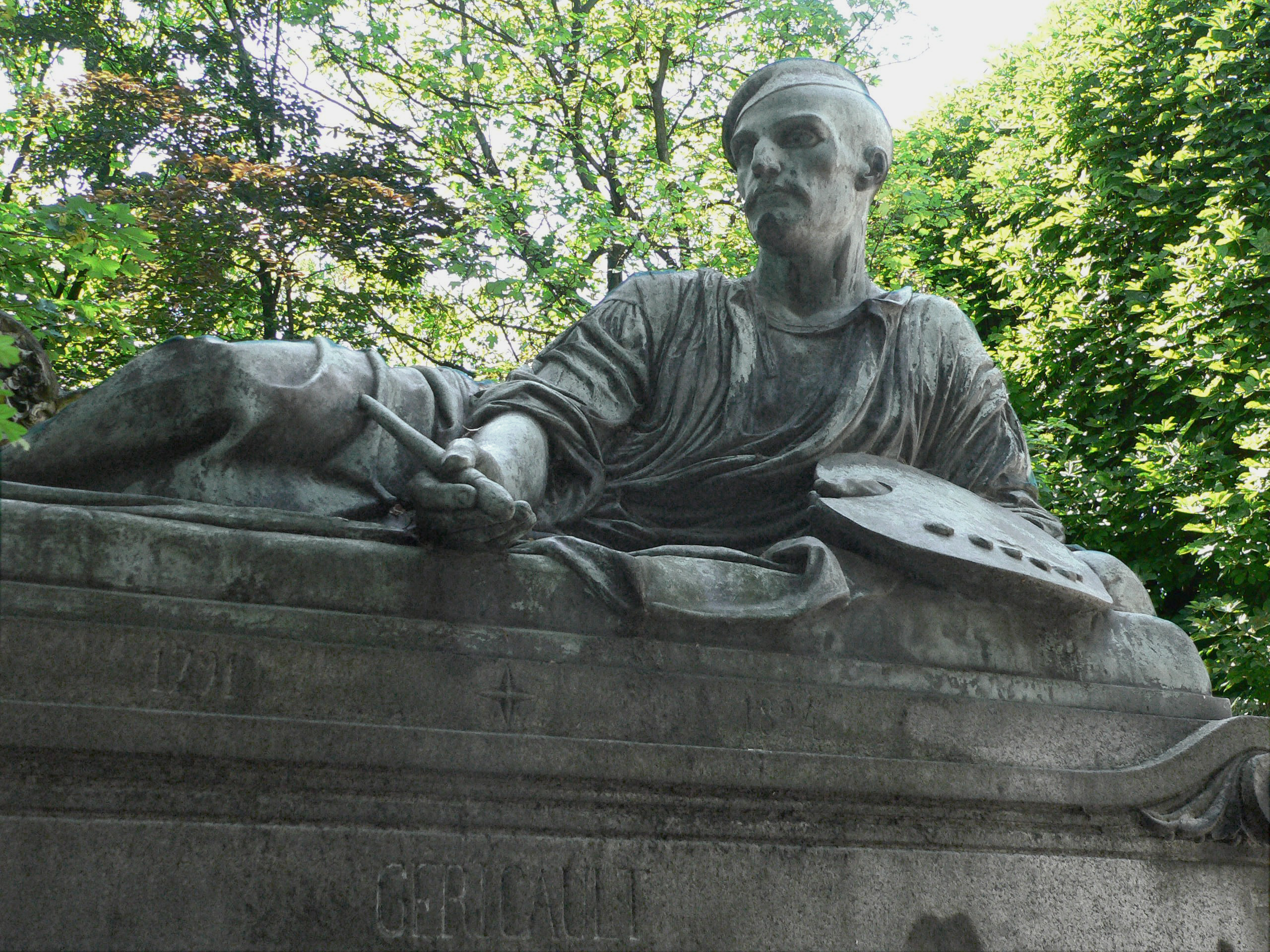
Monument at Géricault's tomb, by sculptor Antoine Étex

After his return to France in 1821, Géricault was inspired to paint a series of ten portraits of the insane. These were the patients of a friend, Dr. Étienne-Jean Georget (a pioneer in psychiatric medicine), with each subject exhibiting a different affliction. There are five remaining portraits from the series, including Insane Woman.

The paintings are noteworthy for their bravura style, expressive realism, and for their documenting of the psychological discomfort of individuals, made all the more poignant by the history of insanity in Géricault's family, as well as the artist's own fragile mental health. His observations of the human subject were not confined to the living, for some remarkable still-lifes—painted studies of severed heads and limbs—have also been ascribed to the artist.

Géricault's last efforts were directed toward preliminary studies for several epic compositions, including the Opening of the Doors of the Spanish Inquisition and the African Slave Trade. The preparatory drawings suggest works of great ambition, but Géricault's waning health intervened. Weakened by riding accidents and chronic tubercular infection, Géricault died in Paris in 1824 after a long period of suffering. His bronze figure reclines, brush in hand, on his tomb at Père Lachaise Cemetery in Paris, above a low-relief panel of The Raft of the Medusa.

== Works ==
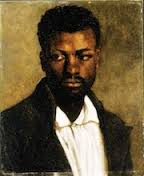
Bust of a Black Man, 1808 (Ajuda National Palace)

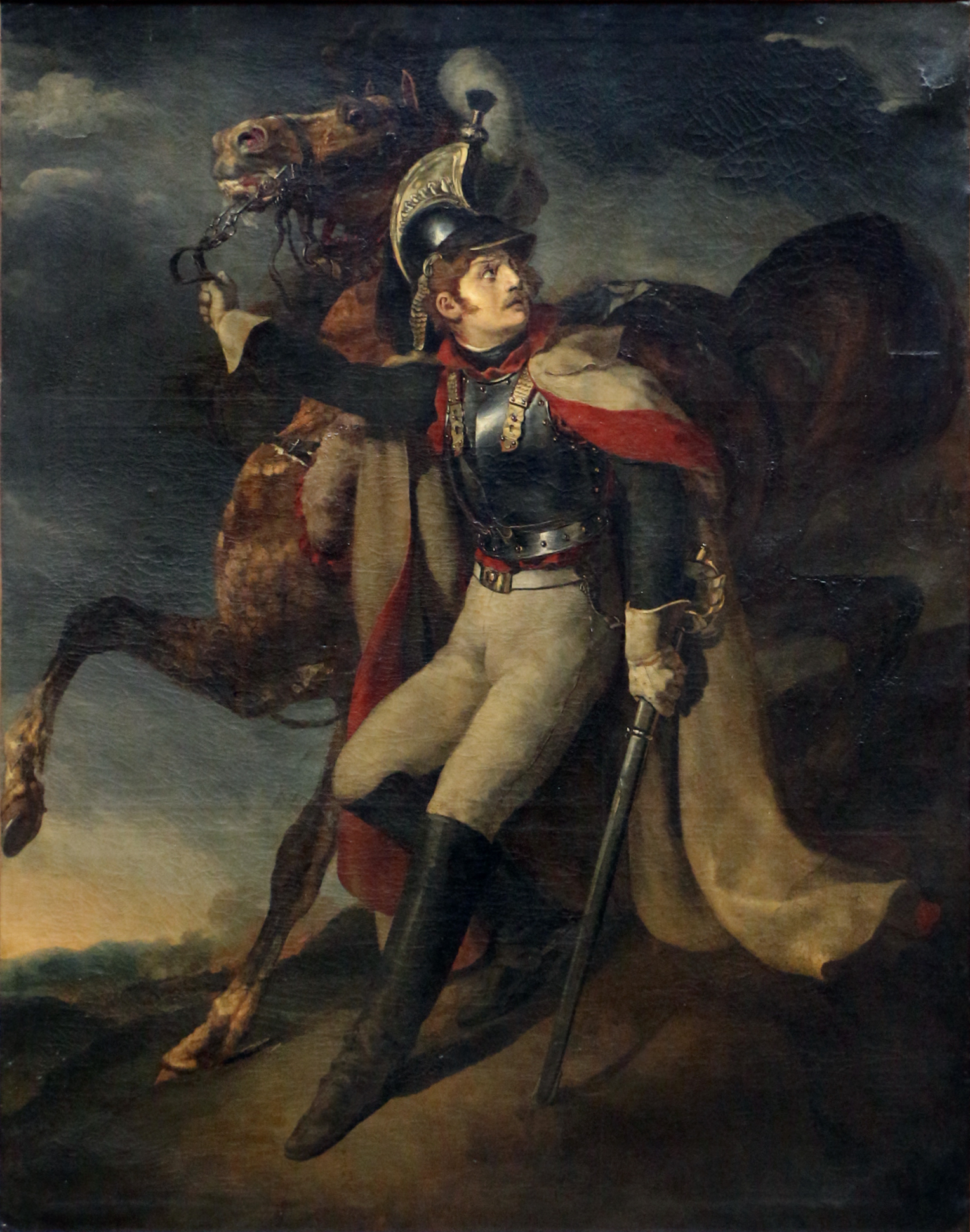
The Wounded Cuirassier, 1814

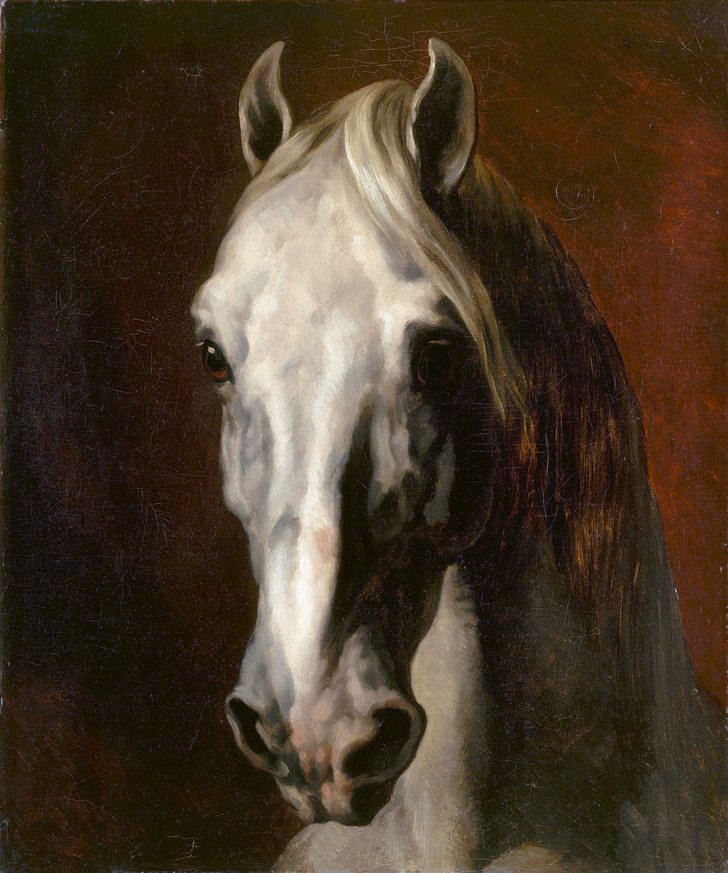
Horse Head, 1815

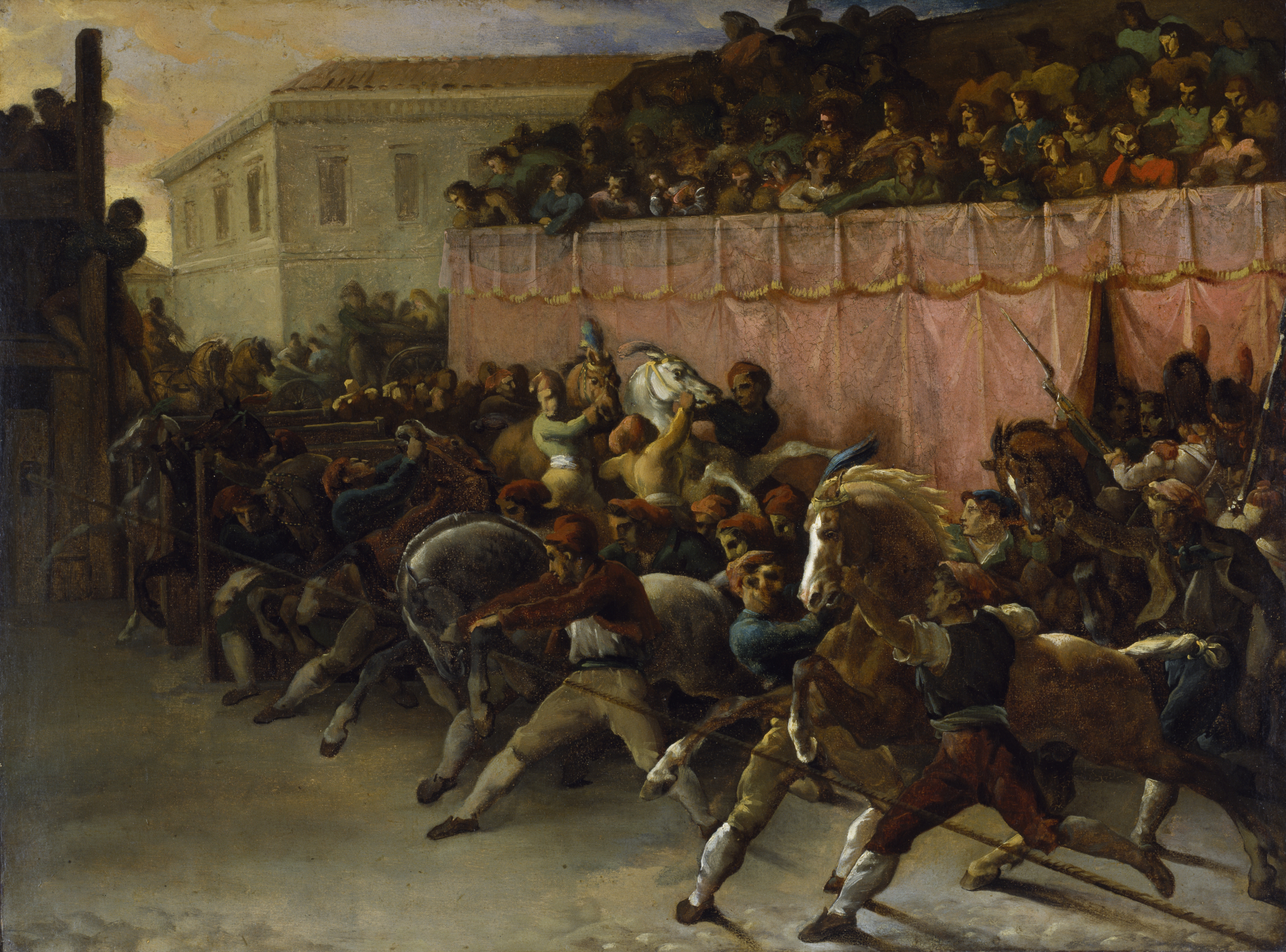
Riderless Racers in Rome, 1817 (The Walters Art Museum)

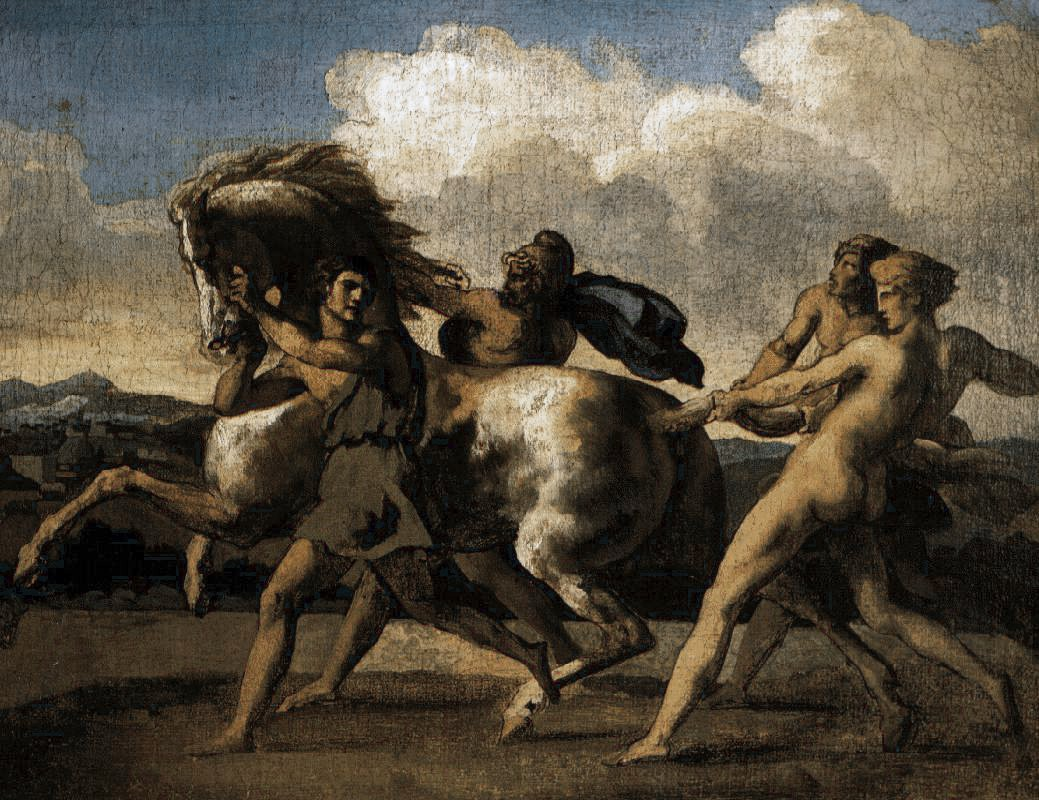
The Capture of a Wild Horse, 1817

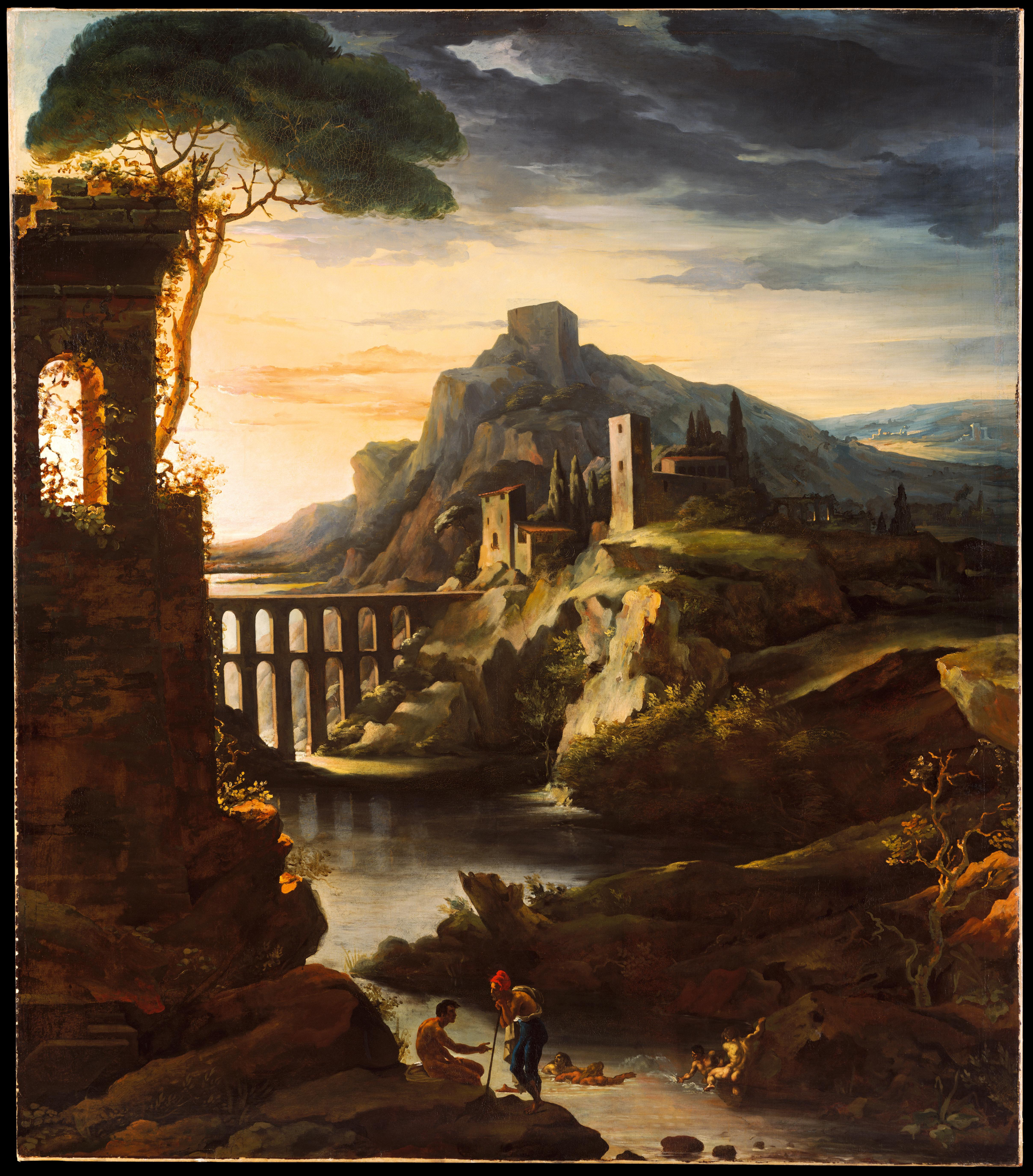
Evening: Landscape with an Aqueduct, 1818

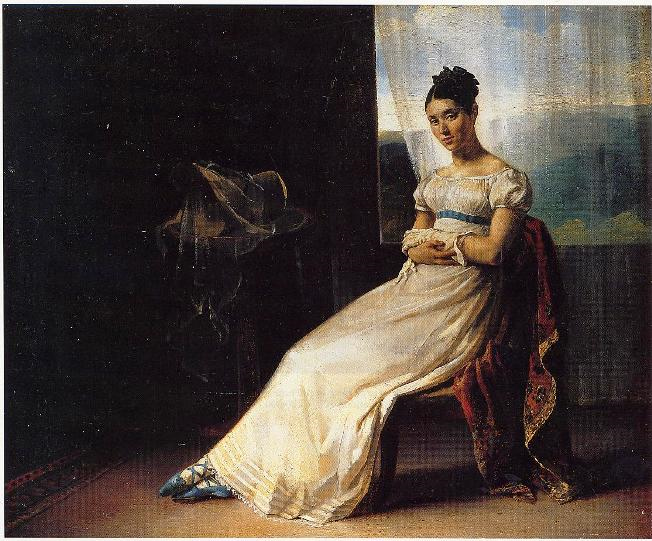
Portrait of Laure Bro, 1818

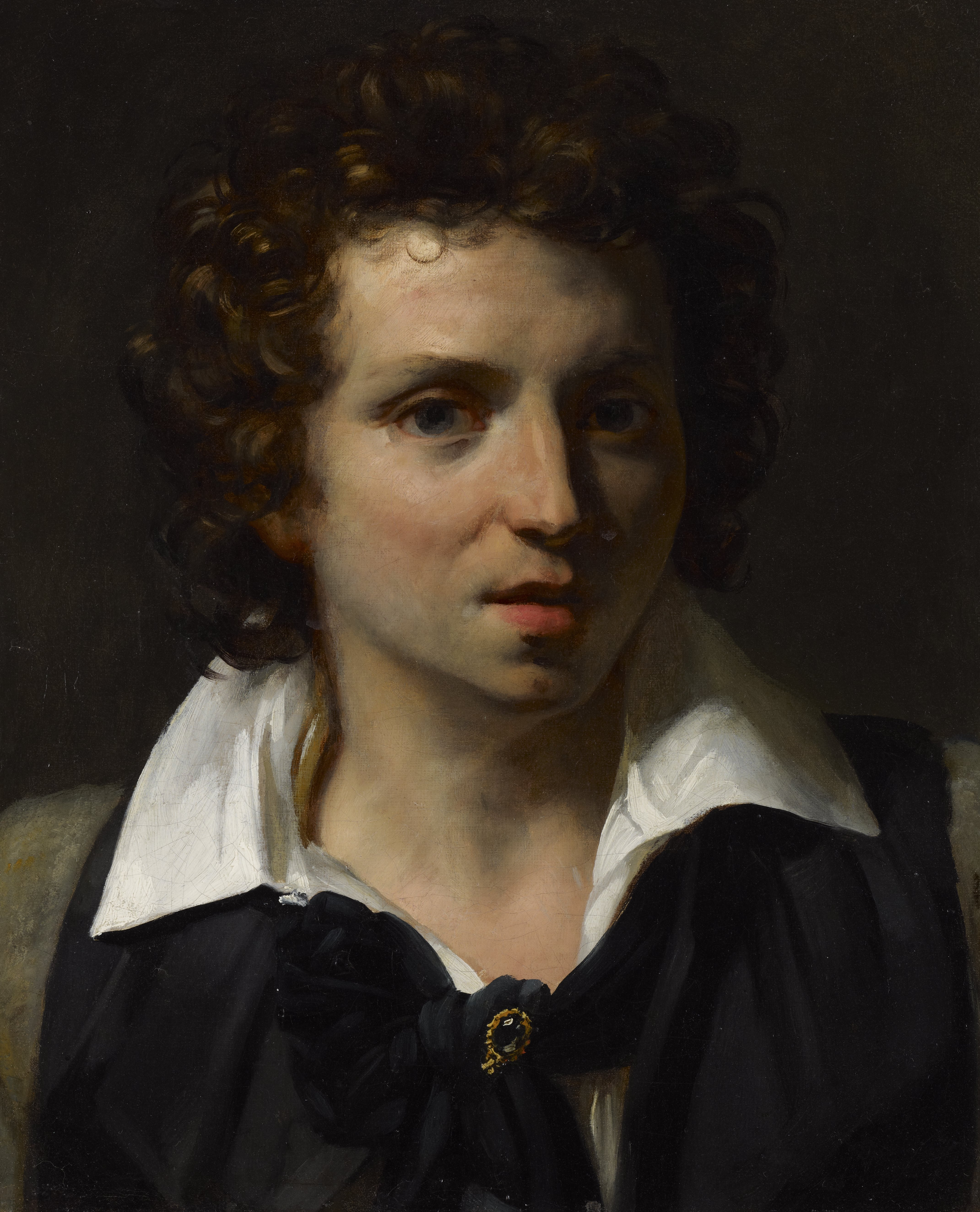
Portrait of a young man 1818

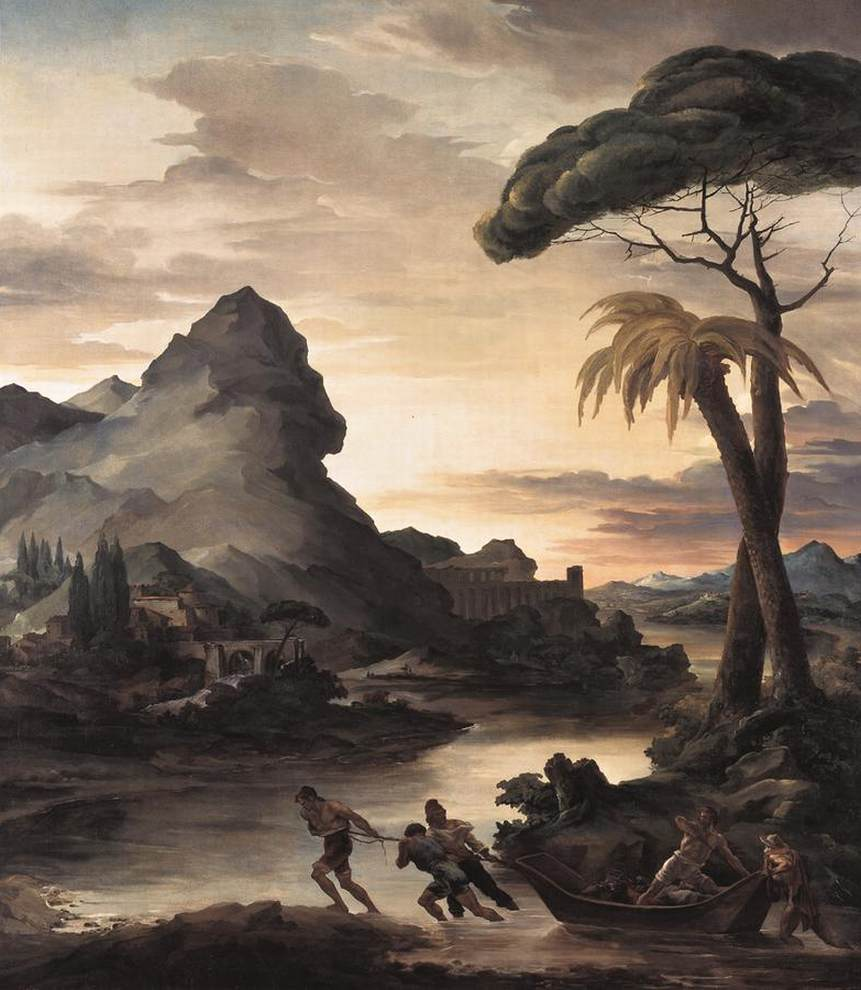
Heroic Landscape with Fishermen, 1818

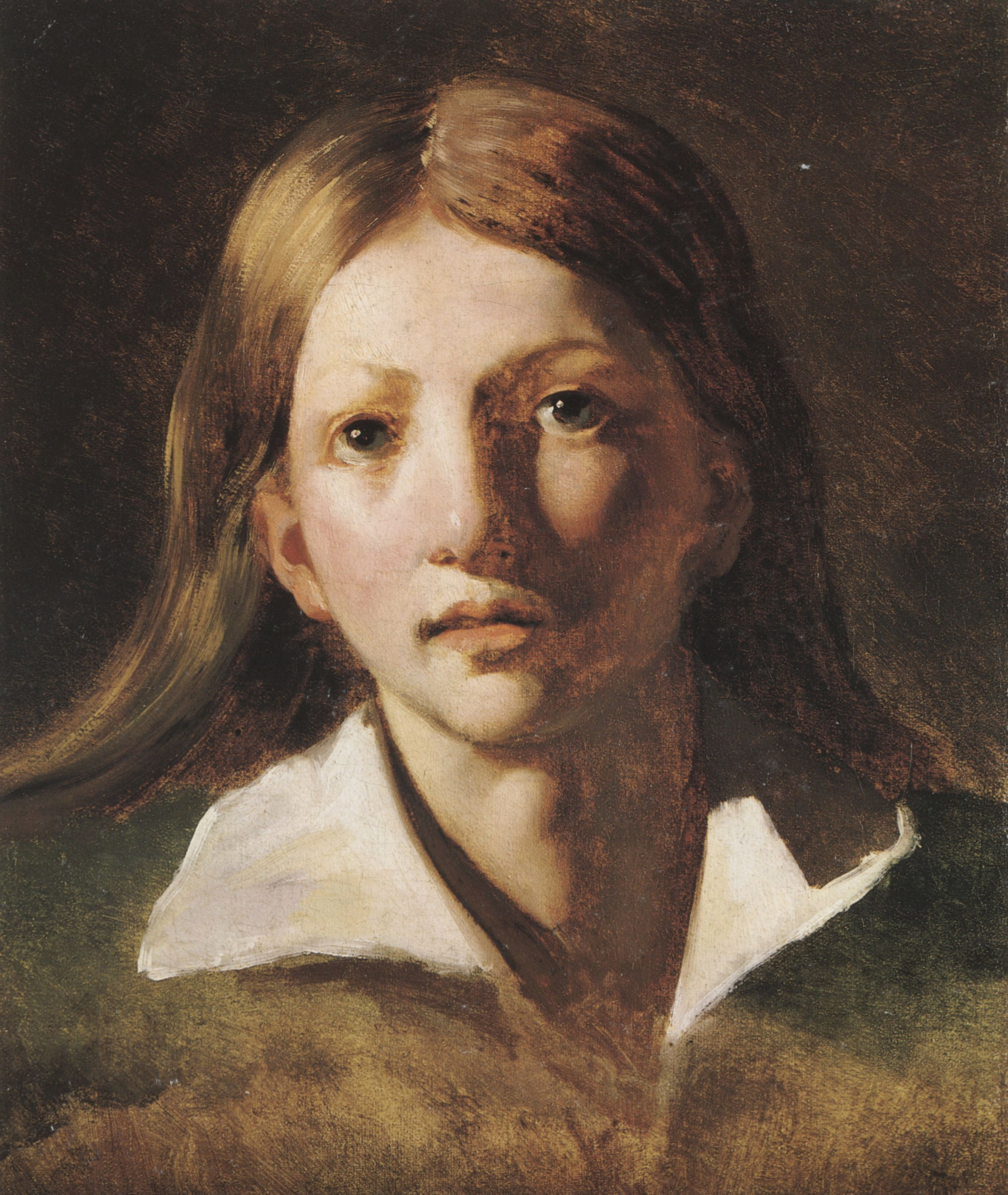
Portrait Study of a Youth, c. 1818–1820

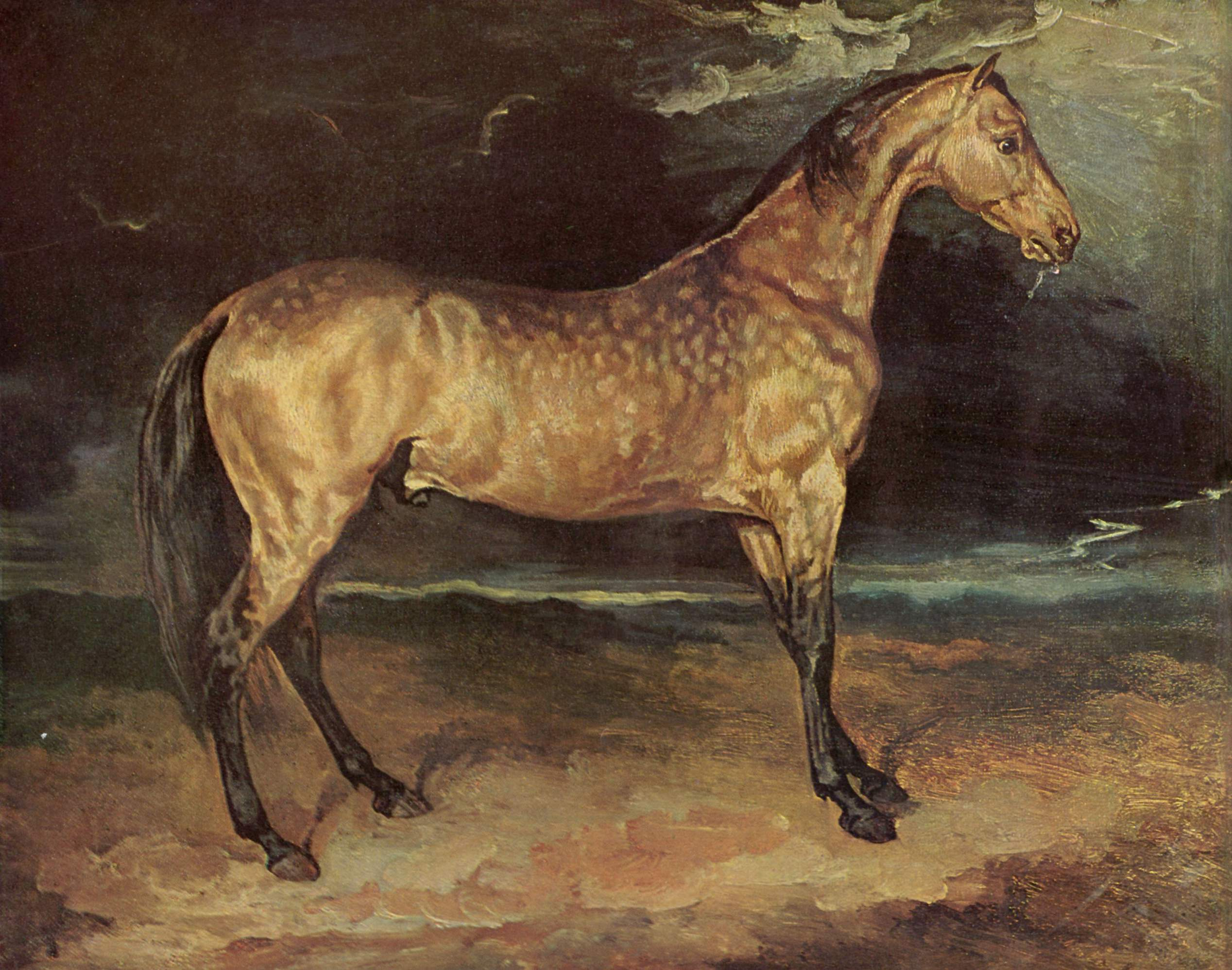
Horse in the Storm, 1820–1821

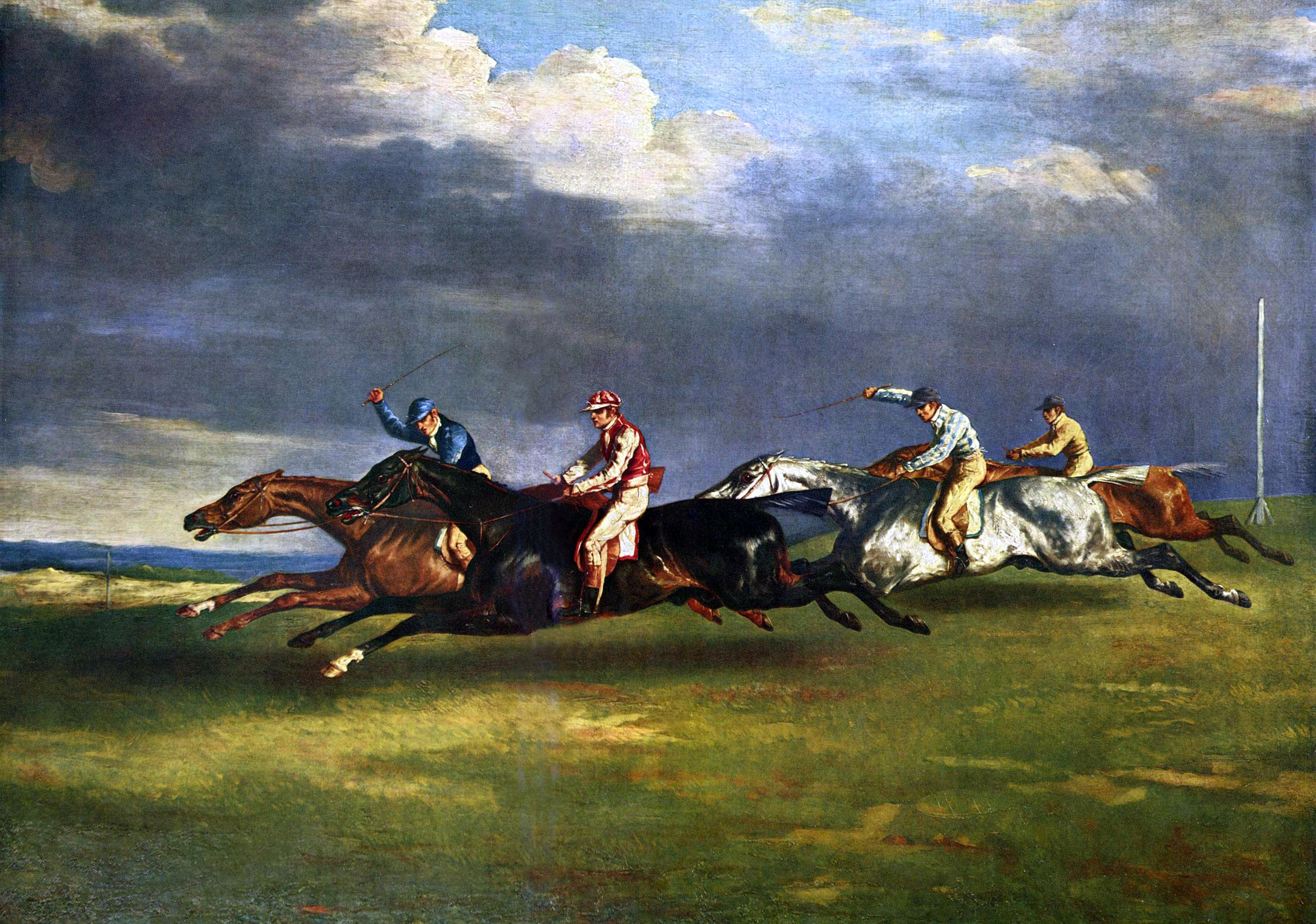
The 1821 Derby at Epsom, 1821

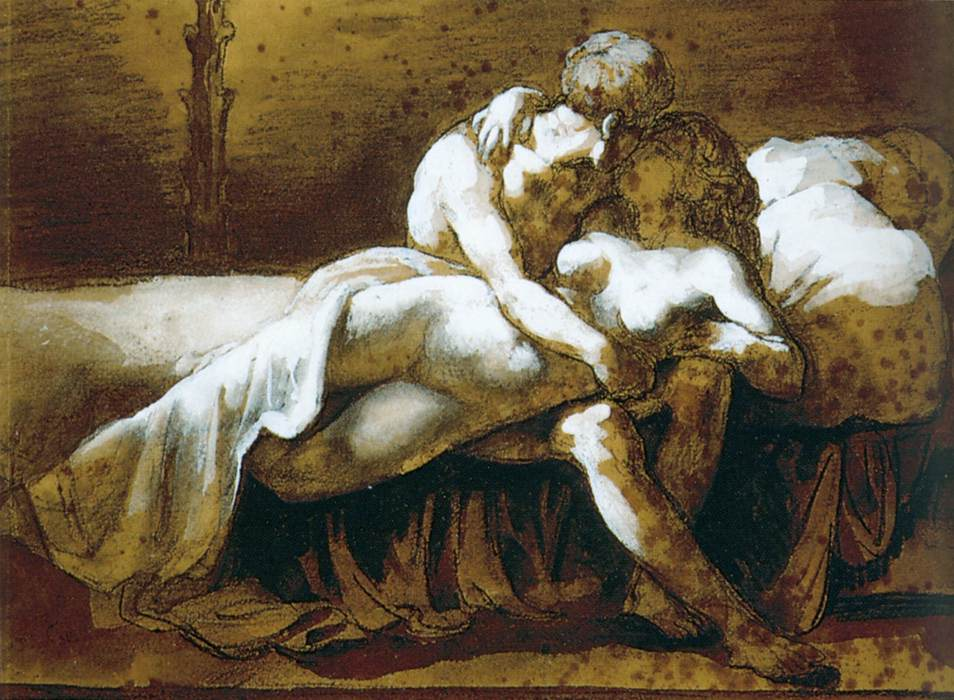
The Kiss, charcoal, sepia wash and white gouache on paper, c. 1822

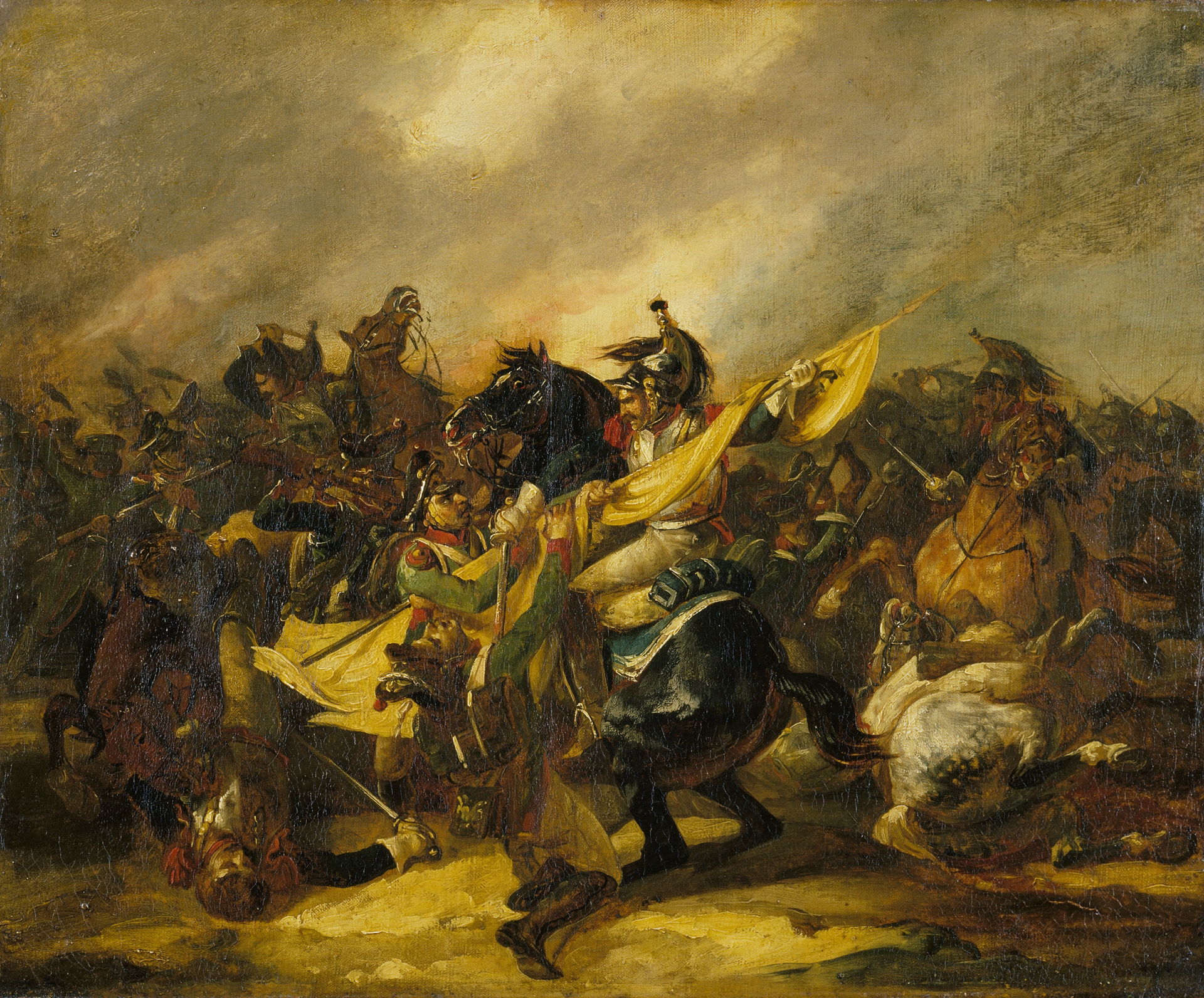
A Charge of Cuirassiers, 1823

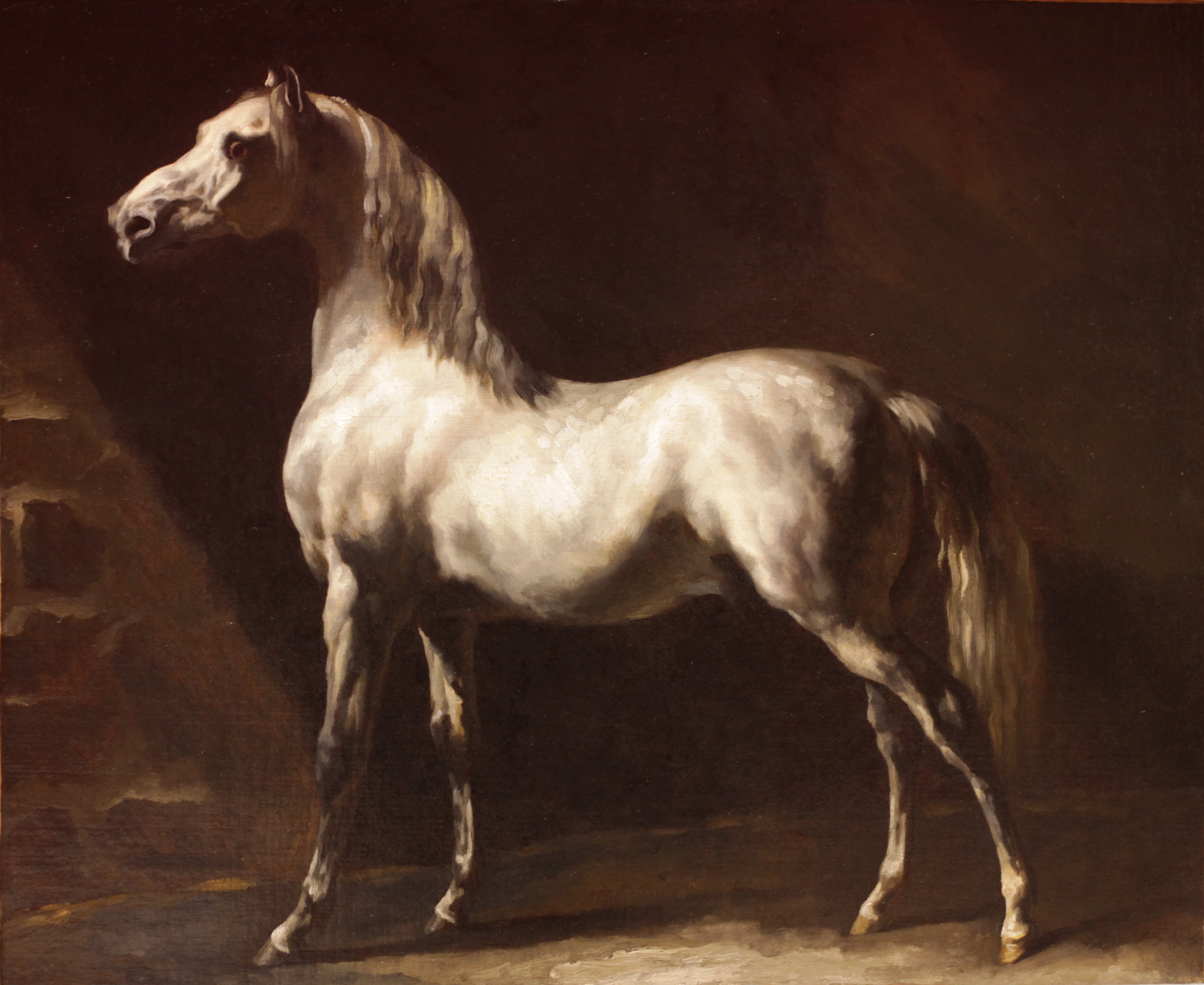
White Arabian Horse, before 1824

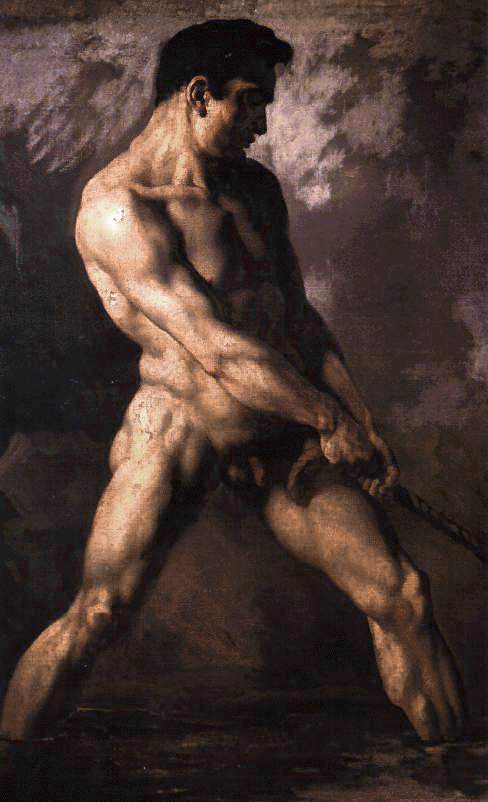
Nude, Musée Bonnat (Bayonne)

=== Les Monomanes (Portraits of the Insane) ===
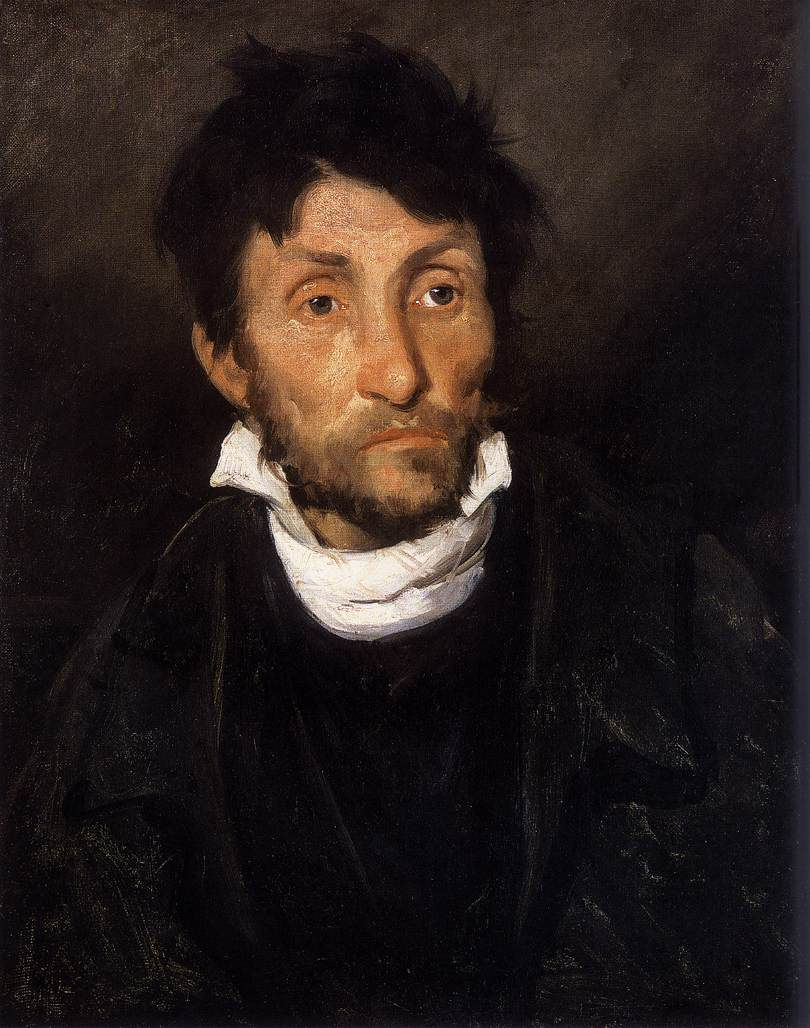
Portrait of a Kleptomaniac (French: Portrait d'un Cleptomane aka Le Monomane du Vol), 1822 (Museum of Fine Arts, Ghent)

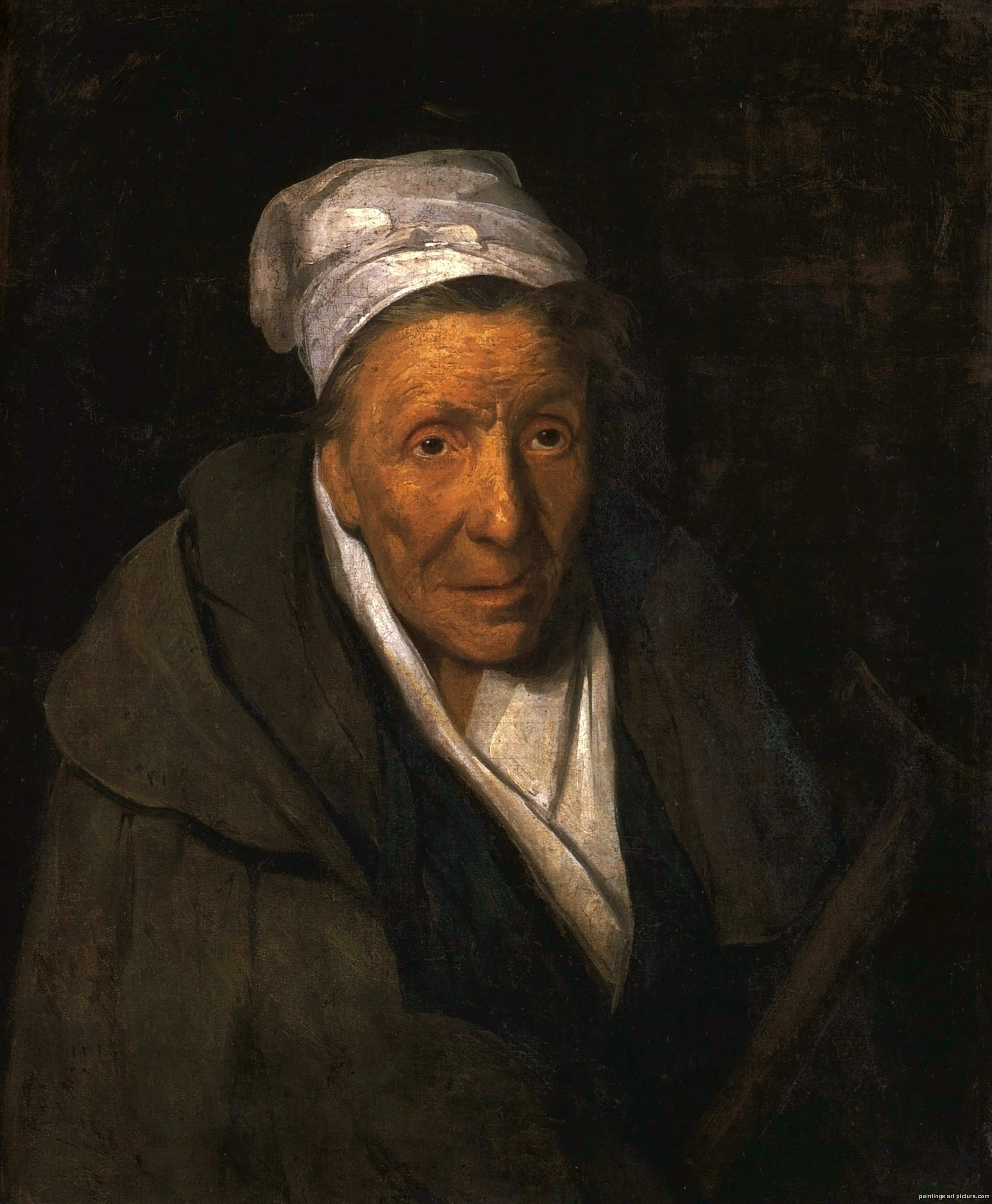
The Woman with a Gambling Mania (French: La Folle Monomane du Jeu), 1822 (Louvre, Paris)

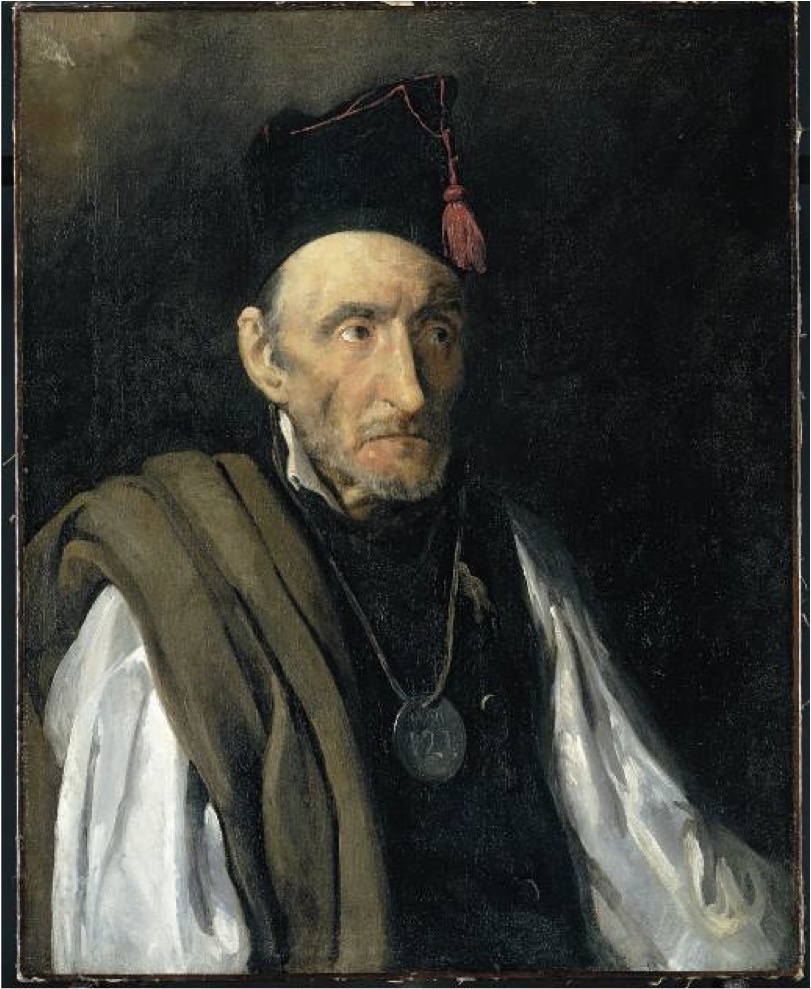
Man Suffering from Delusions of Military Rank (French: Le Monomane du Commandement Militaire), 1822 (Collection Oskar Reinhart am Römerholz, Winterthur)

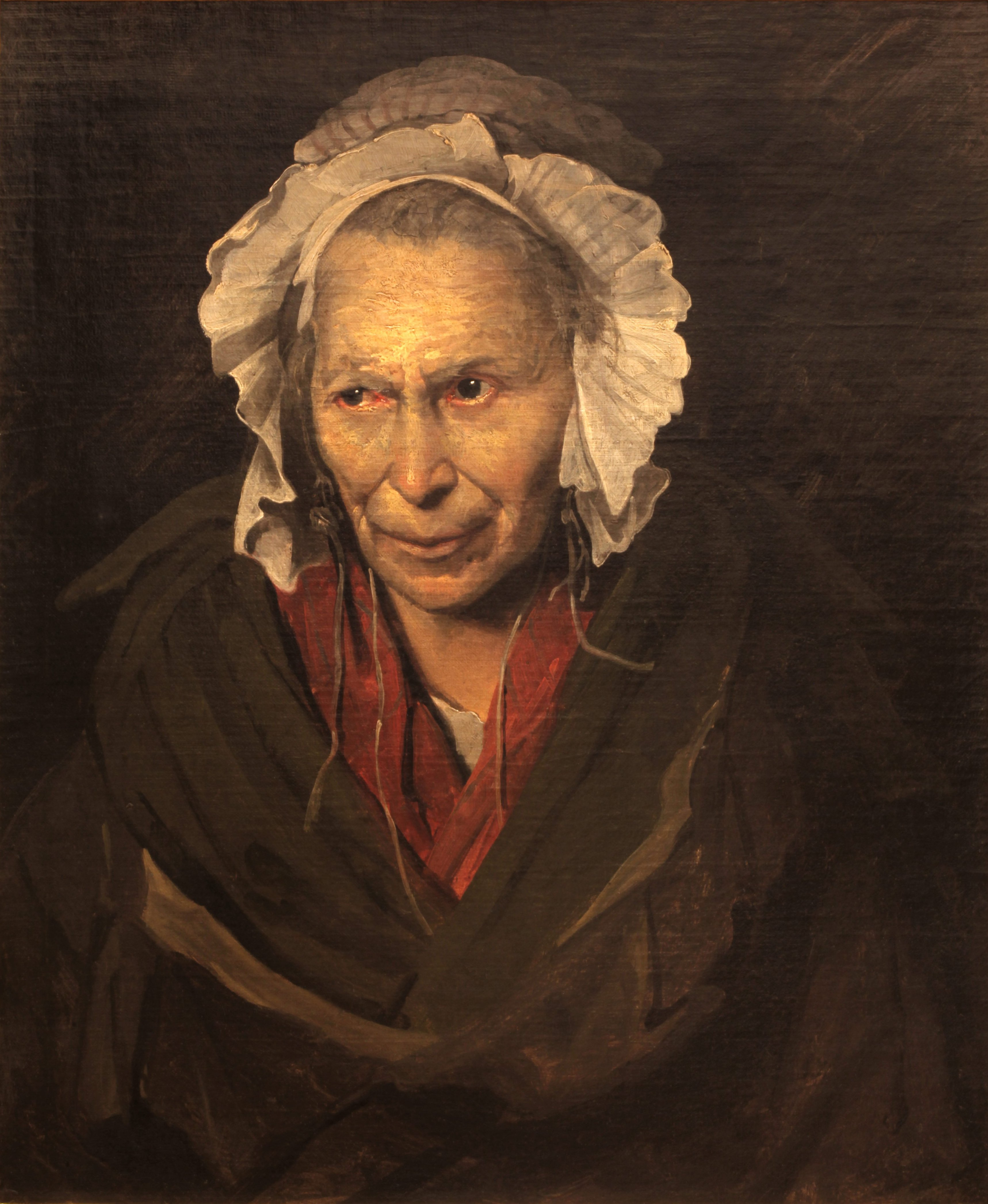
Portrait of a Woman Suffering from Obsessive Envy (French: La Monomane de l'envie), 1822 (Museum of Fine Arts of Lyon)

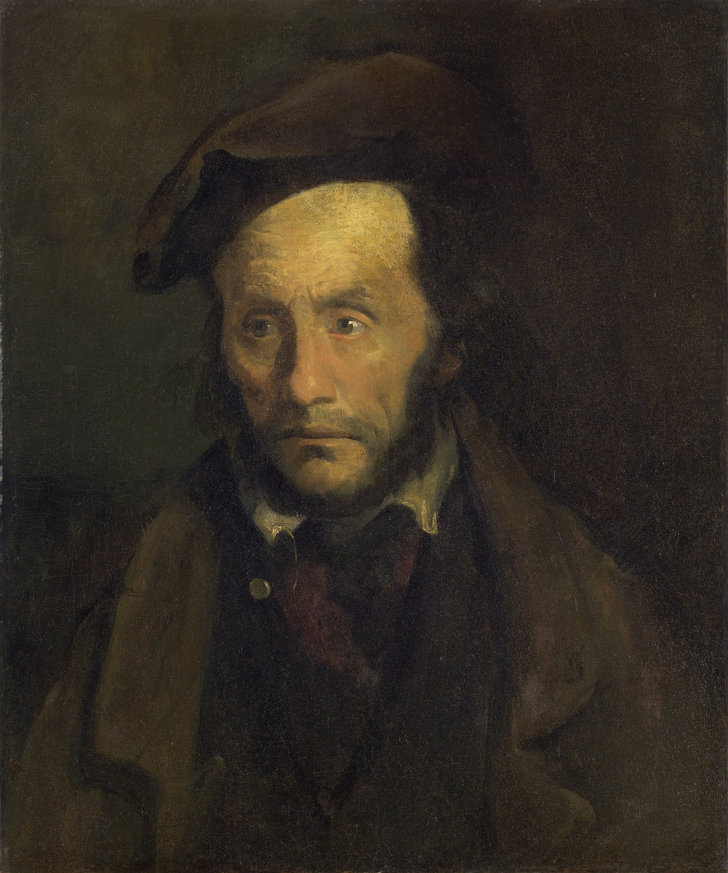
Portrait of a Child Snatcher aka The Child Thief aka The Madman-Kidnapper (French: Le Monomane du vol d'enfants), 1822–1823 (Michele and Donald D’Amour Museum of Fine Arts, Springfield, Massachusetts)

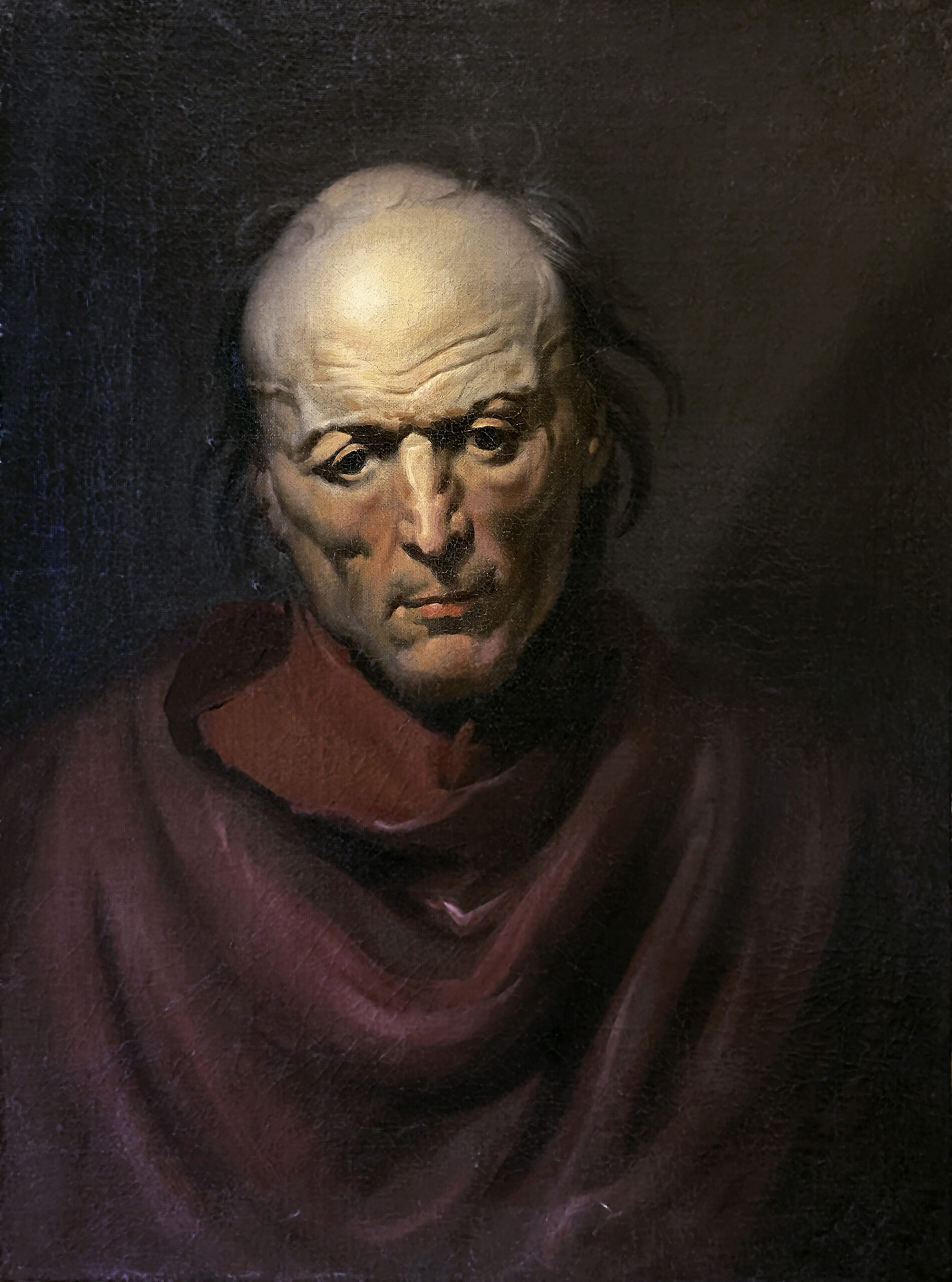
The Melancholic Man (attribution) [Unknown Year] (Ravenna, Emilia-Romagna, Italy)

== See also ==
- Joseph (art model), remembered for his professional relationship with Géricault
