= René Semelaigne =

French psychiatrist and biographer

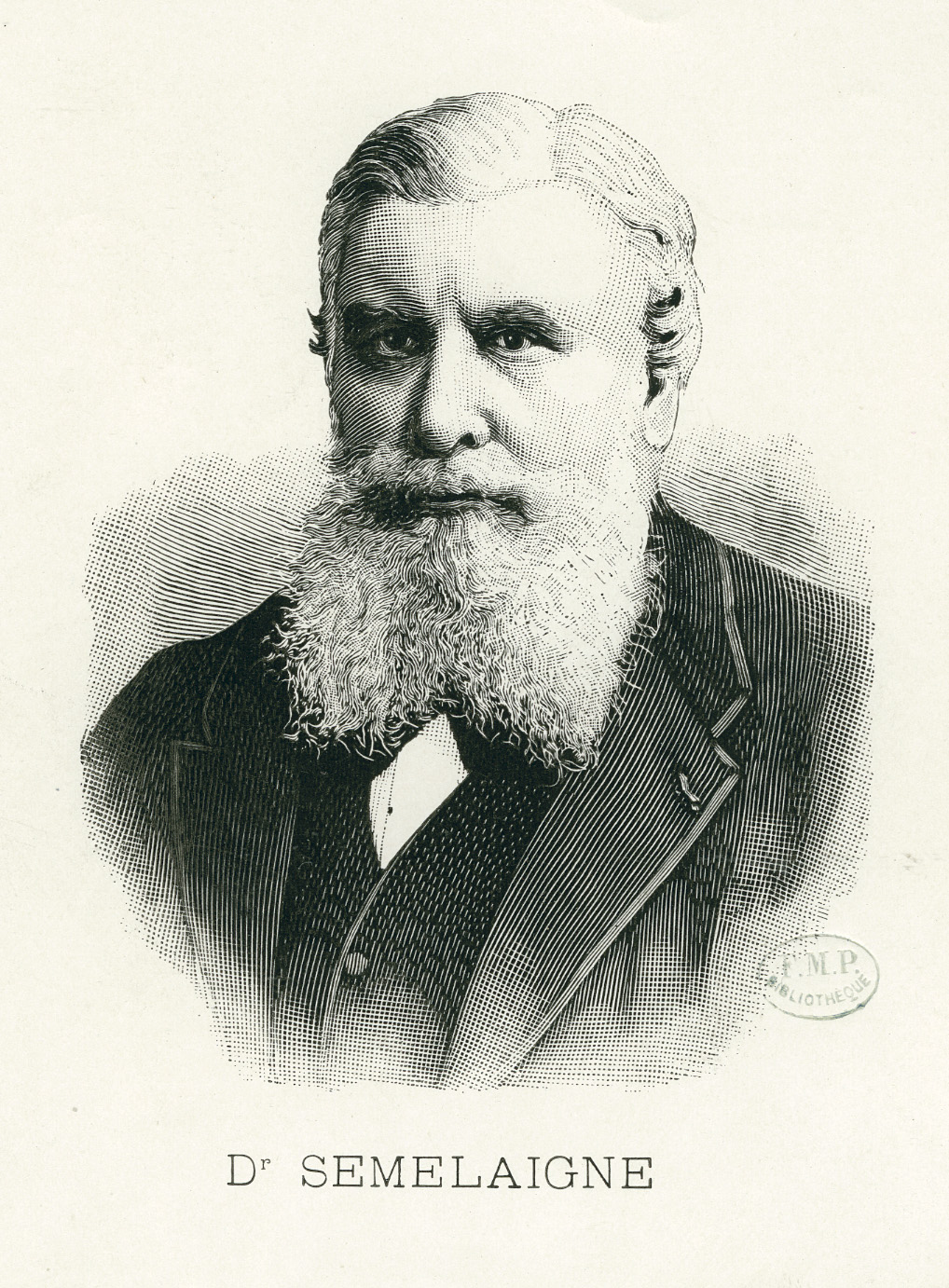
René Semelaigne

René Semelaigne (12 December 1855 – 16 November 1934) was a French psychiatrist and biographer born in Neuilly-sur-Seine. He was the son of psychiatrist Armand Semelaigne (1820–1898) and a great-nephew of Philippe Pinel (1745-1826).

As a psychiatrist, he served as director of the Maison de santé de la Folie Saint-James à Neuilly. He is remembered for his historical studies of psychiatry, being the author of three well-regarded works:

- Les grands aliénistes français (1894) - The great French alienists. Involves biographical studies of Pinel, Esquirol, Ferrus, Falret, Voisin and Georget.
- Aliénistes et philanthropes. Les Pinel et les Tuke (1912) - Alienists and philanthropists. Pinel and Tuke.
- Les pionniers de la psychiatrie française avant et après Pinel - The pioneers of French psychiatry before and after Pinel; Volume 1, Paris, JB Bailliere and Son, 1930 and Volume 2, 1932.
