= Monomania =

Mental illness involving an unhealthily intense obsession with one specific thing

- Monomaniac of Envy by Théodore Géricault, 1822
- Specialty: Psychiatry

In 19th-century psychiatry, monomania (from Greek monos, "one", and mania, meaning "madness" or "frenzy") was a form of partial insanity conceived as a single psychological obsession in an otherwise sound mind.

== Types ==
Monomania may refer to:

- Bibliomania: Excessive collecting or hoarding of books.
- Erotomania (also known as De Clérambault's syndrome): Delusion that a particular person is in love with the patient. This can occur without reinforcement or even acquaintanceship with the love object.
- Idée fixe: Domination by an overvalued idea, for example, "staying thin" in anorexia nervosa
- Kleptomania: Irresistible urge to steal
- Pyromania: Impulse to deliberately start fires
- Lypemania: Early elaboration later to become modern concept of depression
- Narcissism: Pursuit of gratification from one's own attributes
- Homicidal monomania: According to Étienne-Jean Georget, an abrupt "lesion of the will" capable of driving an otherwise sane person to murder

== History ==
Partial insanity, variations of which enjoyed a long prehistory in jurisprudence, was in contrast to the traditional notion of total insanity, exemplified in the diagnosis of mania, as a global condition affecting all aspects of understanding and which reflected the position that the mind or soul was an indivisible entity. Coined by the French psychiatrist Jean-Étienne Dominique Esquirol (1772–1840) around 1810, monomania was a new disease-concept characterised by the presence of an expansive fixed idea, in which the mind was diseased and deranged in some facets but otherwise normal. Esquirol and his circle described three broad categories of monomania, consistent with their three-part classification of the mind into intellectual, emotional and volitional faculties. Emotional monomania is that in which the patient is obsessed with only one emotion or several related to it; intellectual monomania is that which is related to only one kind of delirious idea or ideas. Although monomania was retained as one of seven recognized categories of mental illness in the 1880 US census, its importance as a psychiatric diagnostic category was in decline from the 1850s on.

== See also ==
- Addictive behaviour
- Idée fixe (psychology)
- Hyperfocus in ADHD and autism
- Intrusive thought
- Moral insanity
