= The Woman with a Gambling Mania =

1822 painting by Théodore Géricault

The Woman with Gambling Mania
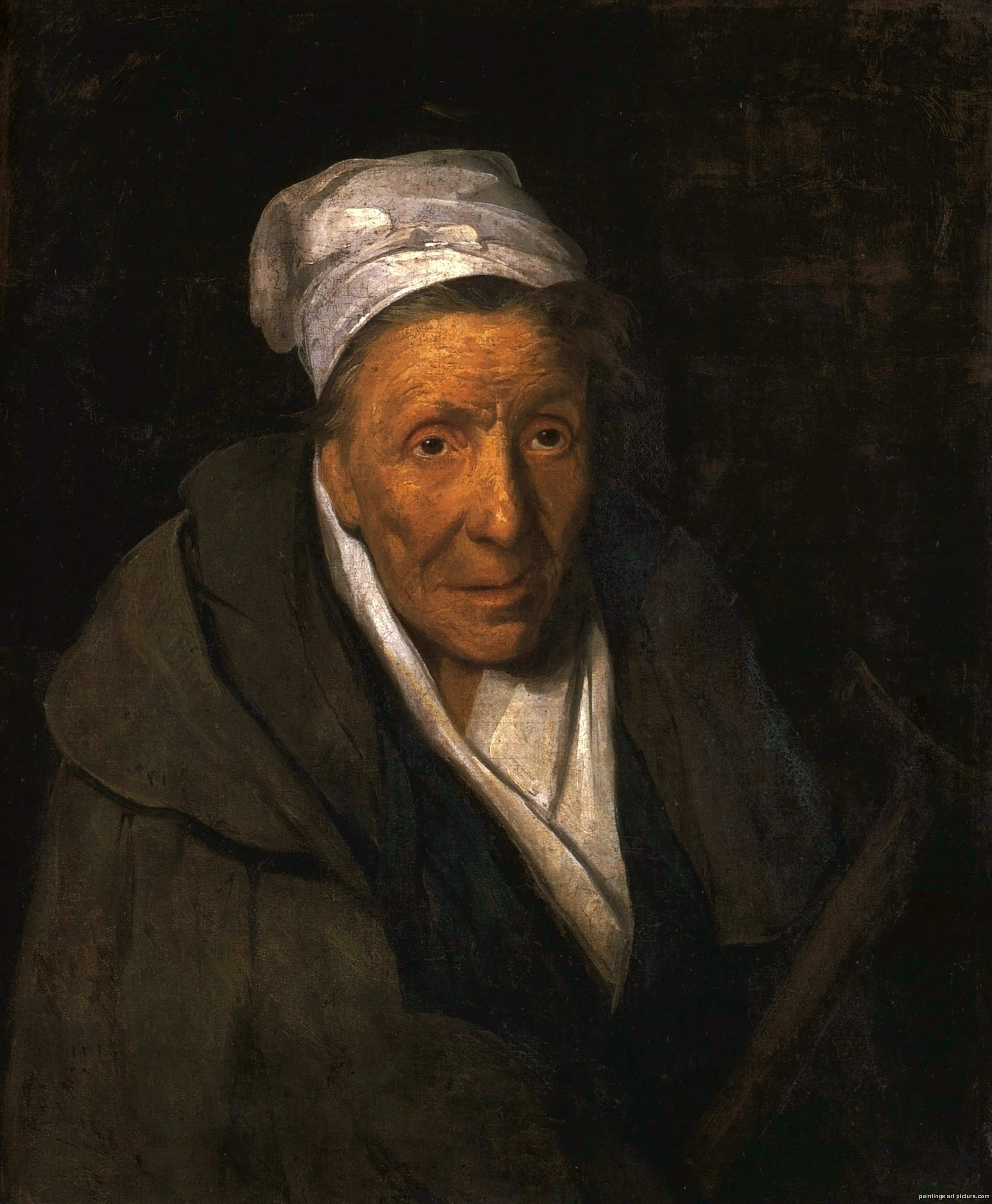
- Artist: Théodore Géricault
- Year: 1819
- Medium: Oil on canvas
- Dimensions: 77 cm × 65 cm (30.25 in × 25.5 in)
- Location: Louvre, Paris

The Woman with Gambling Mania (French: La Folle Monomane du jeu) is an 1822 painting by Théodore Géricault. It is a member of a series of ten portraits of people with specific manias done by Géricault between 1820 and 1824, including Portrait of a Kleptomaniac and Insane Woman. Following the controversy surrounding his The Raft of the Medusa, Géricault fell into a depression. In return for help by psychiatrist Étienne-Jean Georget, Géricault offered him a series of paintings of mental patients, including this one, in a time when the scientific world was curious about the minds of the mentally insane. A solid example of romanticism, Géricault's portrait of a mental asylum patient attempts to show a specific form of insanity through facial expression.

This painting was acquired by the Louvre in 1938.
