= Chremastistophilia =

Sexual arousal from being robbed

Chrematistophilia (from Greek stem χρηματιστής chrematistes (meaning "money-giver" or "money-trader") and the suffix -philia) is a paraphilia whereby sexual arousal is obtained from being robbed. Kleptolagnia is its opposite, sexual arousal obtained through theft or breaking and entering.
