= Kleptomania =

Inability to resist the urge to steal

- Other names: Klopemania
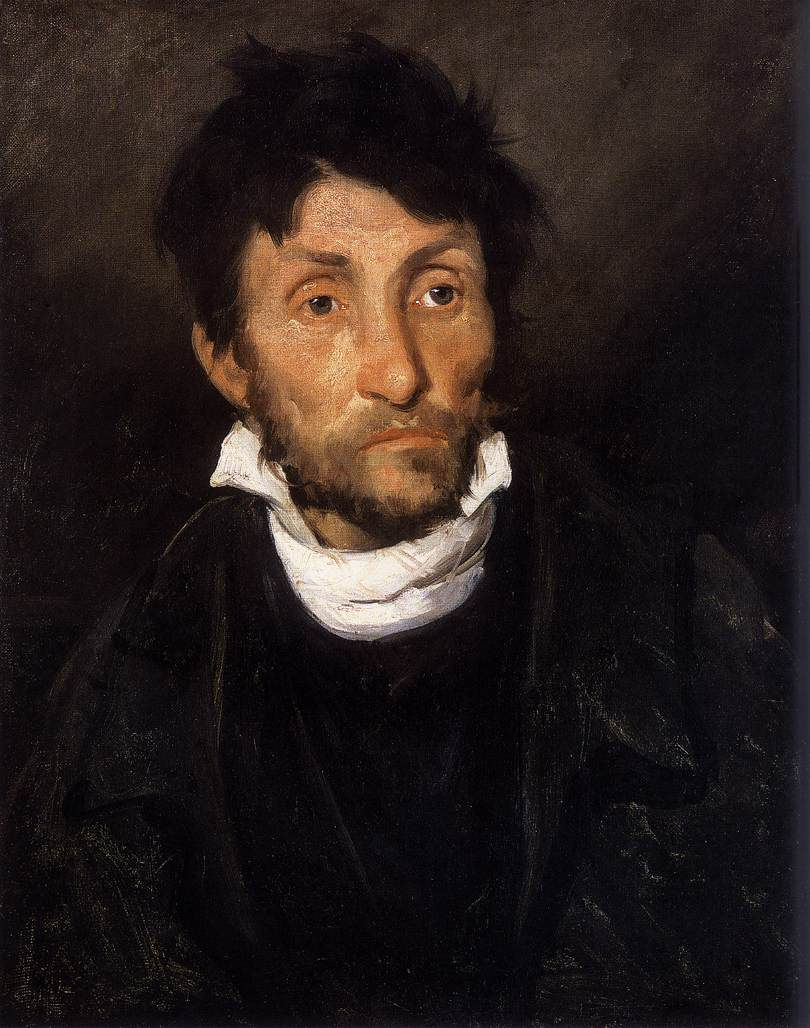
- Portrait of a Kleptomaniac by Théodore Géricault
- Specialty: Psychiatry
- Symptoms: Compulsive urge to steal items without a reason or use for the items.
- Complications: Arrest
- Risk factors: Past incidents of stealing without consequences

Kleptomania (/klɛptoʊmeɪniə/) is the inability to resist the urge to steal items, usually for reasons other than personal use or financial gain. First described in 1816, kleptomania is classified in psychiatry as an impulse-control disorder. Some of the main characteristics of the disorder suggest that kleptomania could be an obsessive–compulsive spectrum disorder, but also share similarities with addictive and mood disorders.

The disorder is frequently under-diagnosed and is regularly associated with other psychiatric disorders, particularly anxiety disorders, eating disorders, alcohol and substance abuse. Patients with kleptomania are typically treated with therapies in other areas due to the comorbid grievances rather than issues directly related to kleptomania.

Over the last 100 years, a shift from psychotherapeutic to psychopharmacological interventions for kleptomania has occurred. Pharmacological treatments using selective serotonin reuptake inhibitors (SSRIs), mood stabilizers and opioid receptor antagonists, and other antidepressants along with cognitive behavioral therapy, have yielded positive results. However, there have also been reports of kleptomania induced by SSRIs.

== Signs and symptoms ==
Some of the fundamental components of kleptomania include recurring intrusive thoughts, impotence to resist the compulsion to engage in stealing, and the release of internal pressure following the act. These symptoms suggest that kleptomania could be regarded as an obsessive–compulsive type of disorder.

People diagnosed with kleptomania often have other types of disorders involving mood, anxiety, eating, impulse control, and drug use. They also have great levels of stress, guilt, and remorse, and privacy issues accompanying the act of stealing. These signs are considered to either cause or intensify general comorbid disorders. The characteristics of the behaviors associated with stealing could result in other problems as well, which include social segregation and substance use. The many types of other disorders frequently occurring along with kleptomania usually make clinical diagnosis uncertain.

There is a difference between ordinary theft and kleptomania: "ordinary theft (whether planned or impulsive) is deliberate and motivated by the usefulness of the object or its monetary worth," whereas with kleptomania, there is "the recurrent failure to resist impulses to steal items even though the items are not needed for personal use or for their monetary value."

== Cause ==
Initial models of the development of kleptomania came from the field of psychoanalysis. These have been replaced by cognitive-behavioral models, which supplement biological ones based mostly on pharmacotherapy treatment studies.

=== Psychoanalytic and psychodynamic approach ===
Several explanations of the mechanics of kleptomania have been presented. A contemporary social approach proposes that kleptomania is an outcome of consumerism and the large quantity of commodities in society. Psychodynamic theories depend on a variety of points of view in defining the disorder. Psychoanalysts define the condition as an indication of a defense mechanism deriving in the unconscious ego against anxiety, prohibited intuition or desires, unsettled struggle or forbidden sexual drives, dread of castration, sexual excitement, and sexual fulfillment and orgasm throughout the act of stealing. The psychoanalytic and psycho-dynamic approach to kleptomania granted the basis for prolonged psychoanalytic or psycho-dynamic psychotherapy as the core treatment method for a number of years. Like most psychiatric conditions, kleptomania was observed within the psycho-dynamic lens instead of being viewed as a bio-medical disorder. However, the prevalence of psychoanalytic approach contributed to the growth of other approaches, particularly in the biological domain.

Many psychoanalytic theorists suggested that kleptomania is a person's attempt "to obtain symbolic compensation for an actual or anticipated loss", and feel that the key to understanding its etiology lies in the symbolic meaning of the stolen items. Drive theory was used to propose that the act of stealing is a defense mechanism which serves to modulate or keep undesirable feelings or emotions from being expressed. Some French psychiatrists suggest that kleptomaniacs may just want the item that they steal and the feeling they get from theft itself.

=== Cognitive–behavioral models ===
Cognitive–behavioral models have been replacing psychoanalytic models in describing the development of kleptomania. Cognitive–behavioral practitioners often conceptualize the disorders as being the result of operant conditioning, behavioral chaining, distorted cognitions, and poor coping mechanisms. Cognitive-behavioral models suggest that the behavior is positively reinforced after the person steals some items. If this individual experiences minimal or no negative consequences (punishment), then the likelihood that the behavior will reoccur is increased. As the behavior continues to occur, stronger antecedents or cues become contingently linked with it, in what ultimately becomes a powerful behavioral chain. According to cognitive-behavioral theory (CBT), both antecedents and consequences may either be in the environment or cognitions. For example, Kohn and Antonuccio (2002) describe a client's antecedent cognitions, which include thoughts such as "I'm smarter than others and can get away with it"; "they deserve it"; "I want to prove to myself that I can do it"; and "my family deserves to have better things". These thoughts were strong cues to stealing behaviors. All of these thoughts were precipitated by additional antecedents which were thoughts about family, financial, and work stressors or feelings of depression. "Maintaining" cognitions provided additional reinforcement for stealing behaviors and included feelings of vindication and pride, for example: "score one for the 'little guy' against the big corporations". Although those thoughts were often afterward accompanied by feelings of remorse, this came too late in the operant sequence to serve as a viable punisher. Eventually, individuals with kleptomania come to rely upon stealing as a way of coping with stressful situations and distressing feelings, which serve to further maintain the behavior and decrease the number of available alternative coping strategies.

=== Biological models ===
Biological models explaining the origins of kleptomania have been based mostly on pharmacotherapy treatment studies that used selective serotonin reuptake inhibitors (SSRIs), mood stabilizers, and opioid receptor antagonists.

Some studies using SSRIs have observed that opioid antagonists appear to reduce the urge to steal and mute the "rush" typically experienced immediately after stealing by some subjects with kleptomania. This would suggest that poor regulation of serotonin, dopamine, or natural opioids within the brain are to blame for kleptomania, linking it with impulse control and affective disorders.

An alternative explanation too based on opioid antagonist studies states that kleptomania is similar to the "self-medication" model, in which stealing stimulates the person's natural opioid system. "The opioid release 'soothes' the patients, treats their sadness, or reduces their anxiety. Thus, stealing is a mechanism to relieve oneself from a chronic state of hyperarousal, perhaps produced by prior stressful or traumatic events, and thereby modulate affective states."

== Diagnosis ==
Disagreement surrounds the method by which kleptomania is considered and diagnosed. On one hand, some researchers believe that kleptomania is merely theft and dispute the suggestion that there are psychological mechanisms involved, while others observe kleptomania as part of a substance-related addiction. Yet others categorize kleptomania as a variation of an impulse control disorder, such as obsessive–compulsive disorder or eating disorders.

According to the Diagnostic and Statistical Manual of Mental Disorders, Fourth Edition, Text Revision (DSM-IV-TR), a frequent and widely used guide for the diagnosis of mental disorders, the following symptoms and characteristics are the diagnostic criteria for kleptomania:

1. repeated inability to defend against urges to steal things that are not essential for private use or for their economic value;
2. escalating sense of pressure immediately prior to performing the theft;
3. satisfaction, fulfillment or relief at the point of performing the theft;
4. the theft is not executed to convey antagonism or revenge, and is not in reaction to a delusion or a fantasy; and
5. the thieving is not better accounted for by behavior disorder, a manic episode, or antisocial personality disorder.

Skeptics have decried kleptomania as an invalid psychiatric concept exploited in legal defenses of wealthy female shoplifters. During the twentieth century, kleptomania was strongly linked with the increased prevalence of department stores, and "department store kleptomaniacs" were a widely held social stereotype that had political implications.

== Comorbidity ==
Kleptomania seems to be linked with other psychiatric disorders, especially mood swings, anxiety, eating disorders, and alcohol and substance use. The occurrence of stealing as a behavior in conjunction with eating disorders, particularly bulimia nervosa, is frequently taken as a sign of the harshness of the eating disorder.

A likely connection between depression and kleptomania was reported as early as 1911. It has since been extensively established in clinical observations and available case reports. The mood disorder could come first or co-occur with the beginning of kleptomania. In advanced cases, depression may result in self-inflicted injury and could even lead to suicide. Some people have reported relief from depression or manic symptoms after theft.

It has been suggested that because kleptomania is linked to strong compulsive and impulsive qualities, it can be viewed as a variation of obsessive–compulsive spectrum disorders, together with pathological gambling, compulsive buying, pyromania, nailbiting, and trichotillomania. This point achieves support from the unusually higher cases of obsessive–compulsive disorder (OCD) in close relatives of patients with kleptomania.

=== Substance use disorder ===
Kleptomania and drug addictions seem to have central qualities in common, including:

- recurring or compulsive participation in a behavior in spite of undesirable penalties;
- weakened control over the disturbing behavior;
- a need or desire condition before taking part in the problematic behavior; and
- a positive pleasure-seeking condition throughout the act of the disturbing behavior.

Data from epidemiological studies additionally propose that there is an affiliation between kleptomania and substance use disorders along with high rates in a unidirectional manner. Phenomenological data maintain that there is a relationship between kleptomania and drug addictions. A higher percentage of cases of kleptomania has been noted in adolescents and young adults, and a lesser number of cases among older adults, which imply an analogous natural history to that seen in substance use disorders. Family history data also propose a probable common genetic input to alcohol use and kleptomania. Substance use disorders are more common in kin of persons with kleptomania than in the general population. Furthermore, pharmacological data (e.g., the probable efficacy of the opioid antagonist, naltrexone, in the treatment of both kleptomania and substance use disorders) could present additional support for a joint relationship between kleptomania and substance use disorders. Based on the idea that kleptomania and substance use disorders may share some etiological features, it could be concluded that kleptomania would react optimistically to the same treatments. As a matter of fact, certain non-medical treatment methods that are successful in treating substance use are also accommodating in treating kleptomania.

=== Obsessive–compulsive disorder ===
Kleptomania is frequently thought of as being a part of obsessive–compulsive disorder (OCD), since the irresistible and uncontrollable actions are similar to the frequently excessive, unnecessary, and unwanted rituals of OCD. Some individuals with kleptomania demonstrate hoarding symptoms that resemble those with OCD. Prevalence rates between the two disorders do not demonstrate a strong relationship. Studies examining the comorbidity of OCD in subjects with kleptomania have inconsistent results, with some showing a relatively high co-occurrence (45–60%) while others demonstrate low rates (0–6.5%). Similarly, when rates of kleptomania have been examined in subjects with OCD, a relatively low co-occurrence was found (2.2–5.9%).

=== Pyromania ===
Pyromania, another impulse-control disorder, has many ties to kleptomania. Many pyromaniacs begin fires alongside petty stealing which often appears similar to kleptomania.

== Treatment ==
Although the disorder has been known to psychologists for a long time, the cause of kleptomania is still ambiguous. Therefore, a diverse range of therapeutic approaches have been introduced for its treatment. These treatments include: psychoanalytic oriented psychotherapy, behavioral therapy, and pharmacotherapy.

=== Behavioral and cognitive intervention ===
Cognitive behavioral therapy (CBT) has primarily substituted the psychoanalytic and dynamic approach in the treatment of kleptomania. Numerous behavioral approaches have been recommended as helpful according to several cases stated in the literature. They include: hidden sensitisation by unpleasant images of nausea and vomiting, aversion therapy (for example, aversive holding of breath to achieve a slightly painful feeling every time a desire to steal or the act is imagined), and systematic desensitization. In certain instances, the use of combining several methods such as hidden sensitization along with exposure and response prevention were applied. Even though the approaches used in CBT need more research and investigation in kleptomania, success in combining these methods with medication was illustrated over the use of drug treatment as the single method of treatment.

=== Drug treatment ===
The phenomenological similarity and the suggested common basic biological dynamics of kleptomania and OCD, pathological gambling and trichotillomania gave rise to the theory that the similar groups of medications could be used in all these conditions. Consequently, the primary use of selective serotonin reuptake inhibitor (SSRI) group, which is a form of antidepressant, has been used in kleptomania and other impulse-control disorders such as binge eating and OCD. Clomipramine, a tricyclic antidepressant, may be used for kleptomania because it is effective in treating obsessive-compulsive disorder. Electroconvulsive therapy (ECT), lithium, and valproate have been used as well.

The usage of SSRIs is due to the assumption that the biological dynamics of these conditions derives from low levels of serotonin in brain synapses, and that the efficacy of this type of therapy will be relevant to kleptomania and to other comorbid conditions.

Opioid receptor antagonists are regarded as practical in lessening urge-related symptoms, which is a central part of impulse control disorders; for this reason, they are used in treatment of substance use. This quality makes them helpful in treating kleptomania and impulse control disorders in general. The most frequently used drug is naltrexone, a long-acting competitive antagonist. Naltrexone acts mainly at μ-opioid receptors, but also antagonises κ- and λ-opioid receptors.

There have been no controlled studies of the psychopharmacological treatment of kleptomania. This could be as a consequence of kleptomania being a rare phenomenon and the difficulty in achieving a large enough sample. Facts about this issue come largely from case reports or from bits and pieces gathered from a comparatively small number of cases enclosed in a group series.

== History ==
In the nineteenth century, French psychiatrists began to observe kleptomaniacal behavior, but were constrained by their approach. By 1890, a large body of case material on kleptomania had been developed. Hysteria, imbecility, cerebral defect, and menopause were advanced as theories to explain these behaviors, and many linked kleptomania to immaturity, given the inclination of young children to take whatever they want. These French and German observations later became central to psychoanalytic explanations of kleptomania.

=== Etymology ===
The term kleptomania was derived from the Greek words κλέπτω (klepto) "to steal" and μανία (mania) "mad desire, compulsion". Its meaning roughly corresponds to "compulsion to steal" or "compulsive stealing".

=== First generation of psychoanalysis ===
In the early twentieth century, kleptomania was viewed more as a legal excuse for self-indulgent haut bourgeois ladies than a valid psychiatric ailment by French psychiatrists.

Sigmund Freud, the creator of controversial psychoanalytic theory, believed that the underlying dynamics of human behaviours associated with uncivilized savages—impulses were curbed by inhibitions for social life. He did not believe human behaviour to be rational. He created a large theoretical corpus which his disciples applied to such psychological problems as kleptomania. In 1924, one of his followers, Wilhelm Stekel, read the case of a female kleptomaniac who was driven by suppressed sexual urges to take hold of "something forbidden, secretly". Stekel concluded that kleptomania was "suppressed and superseded sexual desire carried out through medium of a symbol or symbolic action. Every compulsion in psychic life is brought about by suppression".

=== Second generation of psychoanalysis ===
Fritz Wittels argued that kleptomaniacs were sexually underdeveloped people who felt deprived of love and had little experience with human sexual relationships; stealing was their sex life, giving them thrills so powerful that they did not want to be cured. Male kleptomaniacs, in his view, were homosexual or invariably effeminate.

A famous large-scale analysis of shoplifters in the United Kingdom ridiculed Stekel's notion of sexual symbolism and claimed that one out of five apprehended shoplifters was a "psychiatric".

=== New perspectives ===
Empirically based conceptual articles have argued that kleptomania is becoming more common than previously thought, and occurs more frequently among women than men. These ideas are new in recent history but echo those current in the mid to late nineteenth century.

== In popular culture ==
Movies

- Mary and Max (2009)
- Klepto (2003)
- Kleptomania (1993)

Series

- Trinkets (2019)
- Breaking Bad (Marie Schrader) (2008)

Books

- Hotel 21 (2023)
- Trinkets (2013)
- Mistborn: Era 2 (Wayne Terrisborn) (2011–2022)

== See also ==
- Portrait of a Kleptomaniac
- Kleptolagnia
- Pathological lying (or mythomania)
- Kleptoparasitism
