= Jean-Pierre Falret =

French psychiatrist (1794–1870)

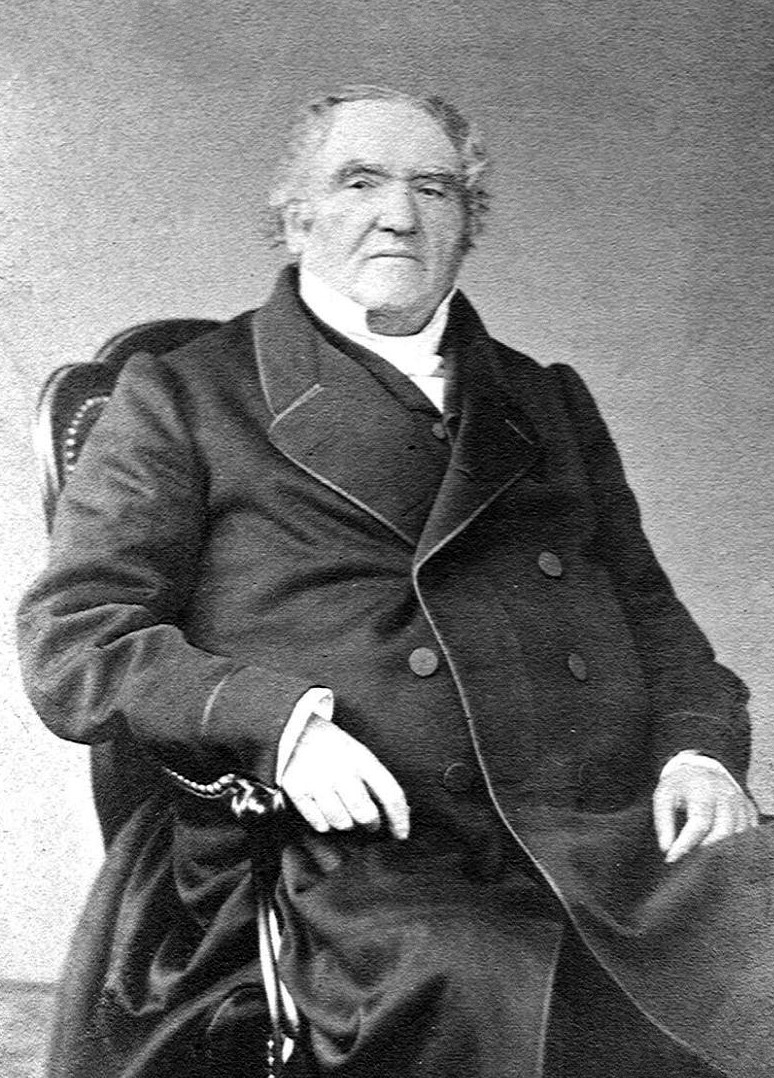

Jean-Pierre Falret (French: [ʒɑ̃ pjɛʁ falʁɛ]; 26 April 1794 – 28 October 1870) was a French psychiatrist. He was born and died in Marcilhac-sur-Célé.

== Biography ==
In 1811, he began his medical studies in Paris, where he was inspired by the work of Philippe Pinel and Jean Étienne Dominique Esquirol. In 1819, he obtained his medical doctorate, afterwards establishing a mental institution with Félix Voisin at Vanves (1822). In 1831, he was appointed chef de l’hospice at the Salpêtrière, a position he maintained until his retirement in 1867.

In 1851, he published an article describing a condition he called la folie circulaire (French pronunciation: [la fɔli siʁkylɛʁ] – circular insanity), of which a patient would experience cycles of manic excitement and cycles of depression. Falret's description is considered to be the earliest documented diagnosis of what today is known as a bipolar affective disorder.

Falret believed in the dualistic nature of the individual, and a separation of body and soul. He proposed that when the soul and a diseased condition interact, a phenomenon he called novum organon appeared. Accordingly, this manifestation of the novum organon created disturbances of the soul and caused mental illness. He believed that this mental condition could not be remedied by somatic treatment alone, but mainly through "psychic" moral methods.

His son Jules Falret (1824–1902), with psychiatrist Ernest-Charles Lasègue, identified a shared psychotic disorder sometimes referred to as "Lasègue-Falret syndrome" (folie à deux). The syndrome is characterized by the coincidental appearance of psychotic symptoms in family members while living together, as well as retention of the symptoms when the individuals are separated. This syndrome can also involve a situation where a diseased family member transmits psychotic symptoms to healthy members of the family. The two doctors published their findings in a treatise called La folie à deux ou folie communiquée.

The Le Centre Hospitalier Jean-Pierre Falret—a psychiatric hospital system serving Lot—is named for Falret.

== An eminent humanist ==
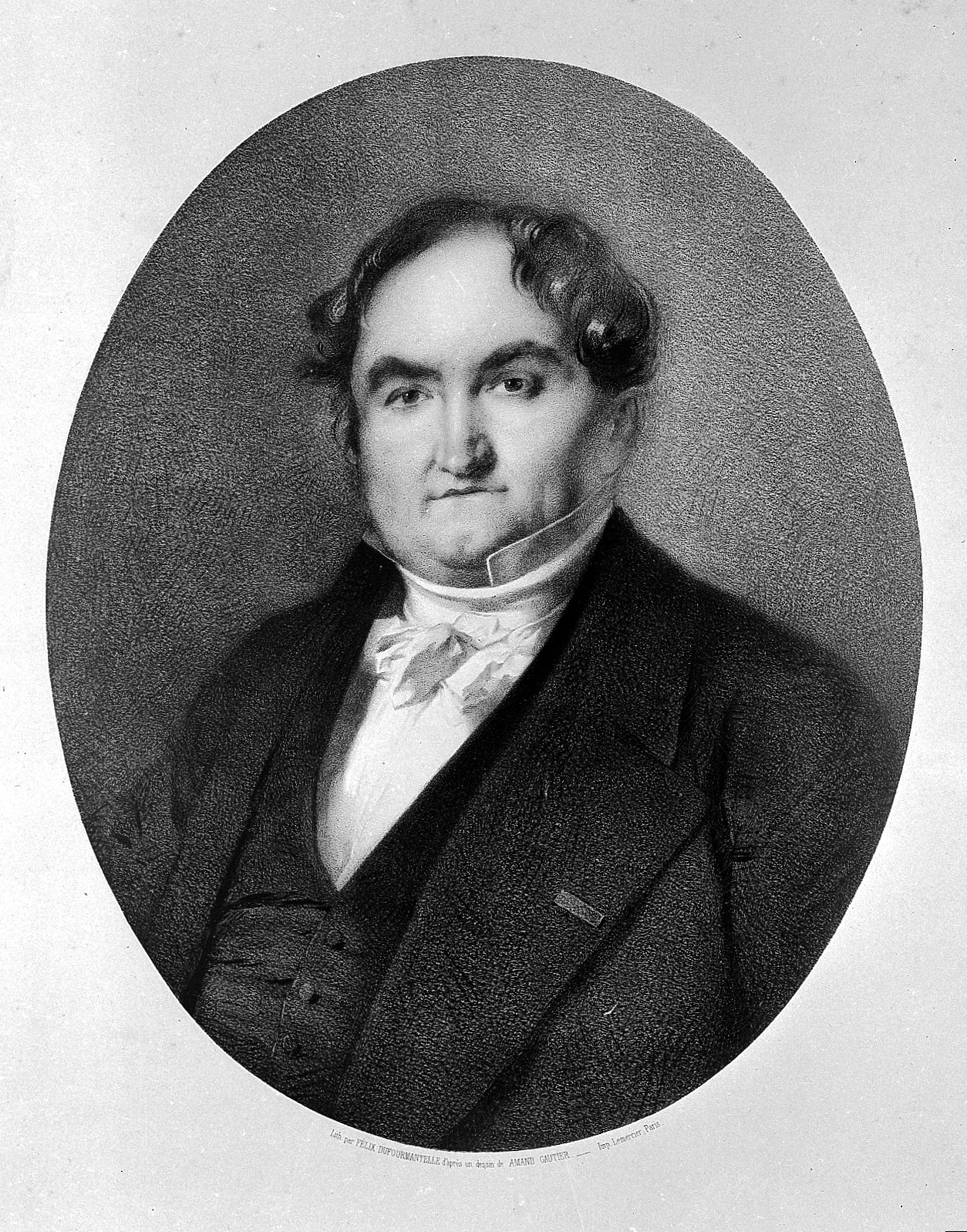
Portrait of Jean Pierre Falret. Lithograph by F. Dufourmantelle after A. Gautier

A fierce opponent of psychiatric reductionism depriving the mental patients of their rights, Falret fought against the injustice by proposing a deeply humane approach respecting the persons with mental problems and open to society. Falret visited asylums in England and Scotland in 1835, and actively contributed to the preparation of the lunacy legislation of June 30, 1838 aimed to re-establish the civil rights of the mentally ill. A pioneer, he was convinced that "the mental patients could be cured and that providing them with their place in society and workplace would guarantee their safety."

"All the most unfortunate circumstances are reuniting so that to dishearten the convalescent mental patients on their way back to the world. The family does not want or cannot accept them anymore; society is rejecting them in terror, and, without the sufficient reaction capacity, they are forced to create ... a new reality... The mental patients are incapable of surmounting so many obstacles. As a result, people easily accuse them of immorality, crimes, or suicide attempts, or the mentally affected are very quickly falling back to the cruel illness where they were so successfully hiding themselves earlier."

Being aware of the fragility of his patients and the risks of relapse, he founded in 1841 "The Patronage Society for the Mental Patients Cured in the Salpêtrière Hospital" ("La Société de Patronage pour les Aliénés sortis guéris de l’Hôpital de la Salpêtrière"). The name of this society was subsequently changed to "The Falret Charity" ("L’Œuvre Falret").

In 1845, Falret visited the Illenau asylum near Achern in the Grand Duchy of Baden, publishing Visite a l'établissement d'aliénés d'Illenau : (prés Achern, grand-duché de Bade), et considérations générales sur les asiles d'aliénés as a result of his experience. In 1865 he was made on honorary member of the Société médicale allemande de Paris (German Medical Society of Paris).

== Written works ==
- Réponse à la Réclamation de M. Spurzheim. Bibliothèque médicale, 1818, 61, 340-350. - Reply to Johann Gaspar Spurzheim, whose "Observations sur la folie" Falret had reviewed in an earlier issue.
- Recherches sur la contagion des fièvres intermittentes; par M. F. Audouard. Bibliothèque médicale, 1819, 63, 178-187.
- Traité du délire, appliqué à la médecine, à la morale et à la législation; par F. A. Fodéré. Bibliothèque médicale, 1819, 63, 310-325.
- Observations et propositions médico-chirurgicales. Paris: Didot Jeune, 1819. – Doctoral thesis.
- Observation d'une nécrose fort étendue des os du crâne, suivie de la dénudation du cerveau. Journal complémentaire du dictionnaire des sciences médicales, 1820, 6, 91-93.
- Observations médicales et Réflexions sur le délire suicide. Journal complémentaire du dictionnaire des sciences médicales, 1820, 6, 324-334; 1820, 7, 9-26, 193-208; 1820, 8, 13-30.
- De la Folie. Considérations sur cette maladie, ...; par M. Georget. Journal complémentaire du dictionnaire des sciences médicales, 1821, 9, 46-64.
- Manuel de médecine légale, ...; par J. H. Briand. Bibliothèque médicale, 1821, 73, 289-298.
- Deux observations de nostalgie. Bibliothèque médicale, 1821, 74, 367-372.
- De l'hypochondrie et du suicide: considérations sur les causes, sur le siège et le traitement de ces maladies, sur les moyens d'en arrêter les progrès et d'en prévenir le développement. Paris: Croullebois, 1822.
- Réflexions sur le siège de la fièvre ataxique, lues. Bibliothèque médicale, 1822, 76, 208-212.
- Inductions des ouvertures des corps des Aliénés, lues à l'Athénée de Médecine, le 6 décembre 1823. Nouvelle bibliothèque médicale, 1824, 4, 72-76.
- (with Félix Voisin) Établissement pour le traitement des aliénés des deux sexes, fondé en 1822, à Vanves, près Paris. Paris: A. Belin, 1828.
- Recherches statistiques sur les aliénés, les suicides et les morts subites (unpublished). – Memoir presented to the Académie des sciences in 1828/1829; a prize-winning paper that earned him the membership of the Académie de Médecine. Source: Serres, Rapport sur le prix de statistique. Bulletin des sciences médicales, 1829, 17, 466-473.
- Observations sur le projet de loi relatif aux aliénés. Paris: Adolphe Éverat, 1837.
- De l'Aliénation mentale. Paris: Mme de Lacombe, 1838. – On mental illness.
- Du délire. Paris: Cosson, 1839. – On delirium.
- Discours prononcé sur la tombe de M. Esquirol, le 14 décembre 1840. Paris: Cosson, 1841.
- Considérations générales sur les maladies mentales. Paris: Henry, 1843.
- Du traitement moral des aliénés. Gazette des hôpitaux civils et militaires, 1848, 356-357; 373.
- De l'utilité des écoles et des réunions pour le traitement des aliénés. Gazette des hôpitaux civils et militaires, 1848, 384-385.
- De l'enseignement clinique des maladies mentales, Paris: L. Martinet, 1850.
- Cours clinique et théorique sur les maladies mentales. Marche de la folie. Gazette des hôpitaux civils et militaires, 1850, 586-587; 1851, 6-8, 18-19, 26-27.
- Leçons cliniques de médecine mentale faites à l'Hospice de la Salpêtrière. Première partie: Symptomatologie générale des maladies mentales. Paris: J.-B. Baillière, 1854.
- Mémoire sur la folie circulaire, forme de la maladie mentale caractérisée par la reproduction successive et régulière de l’état maniaque, de l’état mélancolique, et d’un intervalle lucide plus ou moins prolongé. Bulletin de l'Académie Impériale de Médecine 1854, 19: 382–400. – Memoir of circular madness, etc.
- "De la non-existence de la monomanie"., Archives générales de médecine, 1854, série 5, n° 04, 147-164. – The non-existence of monomania.
- Du traitement général des aliénés. Leçon faite à l'hospice de la Salpêtrière en 1854. – General treatment of insanity.
- Lettre à l'Académie, au sujet de la discussion qui a eu lieu récemment sur la folie. Bulletin de l'Académie Impériale de Médecine, 1855, 20, 1069-1071.
- Congestion cérébrale apoplectiforme. Bulletin de l'Académie Impériale de Médecine, 1861, 26, 355-372.
- Des maladies mentales et des asiles d'aliénés: leçons cliniques et considérations générales. Paris: J.-B. Baillière et fils, 1864. – A collection of 14 previously published works by Falret.

English translations:

- Melancholia. Suicide produced solely by a Self-persuasion of its Hereditary Predisposition. The London Medical and Physical Journal, 1822, 47, 298-300.
- Review of M. Falret's Work on Suicide and Hypochondriasis. The Medical Intelligencer, January 1823, 1-6.
- On Clinical Instruction in Insanity. The British and Foreign Medico-Chirurgical Review, 1850, 6, 263-266.
- On the Clinical Study of Mental Diseases. The Journal of Psychological Medicine and Mental Pathology, 1850, 3, 225-226.
- Baillarger and Falret on a new species of insanity. The American Journal of Insanity, 1855, 11, 230-238. - "Memoir on 'la folie circulaire,' a form of insanity characterized by the successive and regular occurrence of mania and melancholia, and by a lucid interval more or less prolonged. By M. Falret, Physician to the Hospital la Salpêtrière", 233-238.
- Clinical Lectures on Mental Medicine, delivered at Salpêtrière. London: Highley, 1855. - A review by John Charles Bucknill appeared in The Asylum Journal of Mental Science, 1856, 2, 77-95.
- Falret's discovery: the origin of the concept of bipolar affective illness. Translated by M. J. Sedler and Eric C. Dessain. American Journal of Psychiatry, 1983, 140, 1127-1133. DOI: https://doi.org/10.1176/ajp.140.9.1127
- Of the Non-Existence of Monomania. In F.-R. Cousin, J. Garrabe, & D. Morozov (eds.) (1999). Anthology of French Language Psychiatric Texts. Le Plessis-Robinson: Institut Synthélabo pour le Progrès de la Connaissance, 105-126.
- ‘De la non-existence de la monomanie’, by Jean-Pierre Falret (1854): Introduction and translation by Thomas Lepoutre. History of Psychiatry, 2012, 23, 356-370; 488-495. DOI: https://doi.org/10.1177/0957154X12445421; DOI: https://doi.org/10.1177/0957154X12461468
