= Kleptolagnia =

Sexual arousal derived from the act of theft

Kleptolagnia (from Greek kleptein meaning "to steal", and lagnia meaning "sexual excitement") is the state of being sexually aroused by theft. A kleptolagniac is a person aroused by the act of theft. It is also known as kleptophilia, and is a sexual form of kleptomania.

Stealing an object of fetish on its own does not constitute kleptophilia. Sexual gratification must come from the act of stealing rather than the solely from object stolen in order to meet the definition of kleptophilia.

== History ==
The term kleptolagnia was coined by James G. Kiernan around 1917. He wanted to differentiate it from kleptomania because kleptomania is defined as theft with no motive, while kleptolagnia is sexually motivated theft.

=== Early cases ===
Cases of kleptolagnia were recorded in France in the early 1900s by Gaëtan Gatian de Clérambault, Depouy, and other psychiatrists. Several of these cases were of women who got sexual gratification out of stealing silk. Around the same time in the United States, William Lee Howard reported the case of a woman who had developed a fetish for men's garters, and was only able to orgasm if she stole new garters.

In Italy in 1924, Benigno Di Tullio reported the cases of a pair of brothers, both of whom were aroused by stealing. Di Tullio believed that the sexual impulse to steal was hereditary.

== See also ==
- Chremastistophilia
