= Félix Voisin =

French psychiatrist (1794–1872)

Félix Voisin (19 November 1794 – 23 November 1872) was a French psychiatrist born in Le Mans.

He studied medicine in Paris, where in 1819 he earned his doctorate. He was a disciple of Jean-Étienne Dominique Esquirol (1772–1840), and a colleague of Jean-Pierre Falret (1794–1870), with whom he founded a private mental institution at Vanves in 1822. Later he provided services for mentally disabled people at a hospice on the rue de Sèvres, relocating to the Bicêtre Hospital in 1840, where he worked with the mentally impaired until his retirement in 1865. One of Voison's better known assistants was educator Édouard Séguin (1812–1880).

Voisin was a leading advocate of the phrenological theories of Franz Joseph Gall (1758–1828) and Johann Spurzheim (1776–1832), and along with Louis Delasiauve (1804–1893) and Jacques-Étienne Belhomme (1800–1880), he is considered to be one of the more prominent members in the French school of phrenology. Voison was particularly interested in the role phrenology could be used to understand the pathology of intellectual disability and insanity. Voisin also did extensive research of satyriasis and nymphomania, and was interested in the relationship between hypersexuality and hysteria.

In his 1851 treatise Analyse de l'entendement humain (Analysis of Human Understanding), Voisin described three major facets of human functionality, which he referred to as moral, intellect and animal factions. These classifications predated, and in a general sense are a parallel to the Freudian concepts of superego, ego and id.

== Selected writings ==
- 1826 – Des causes morales et physiques des maladies mentales
- 1839 – De l'Homme animal
- 1847 – Du traitement intelligent de la folie et application de quelques uns de ses principes à la reforme des criminels
- 1851 – Analyse de l'entendement humain
