= Portrait of a Kleptomaniac =

1822 painting by Théodore Géricault

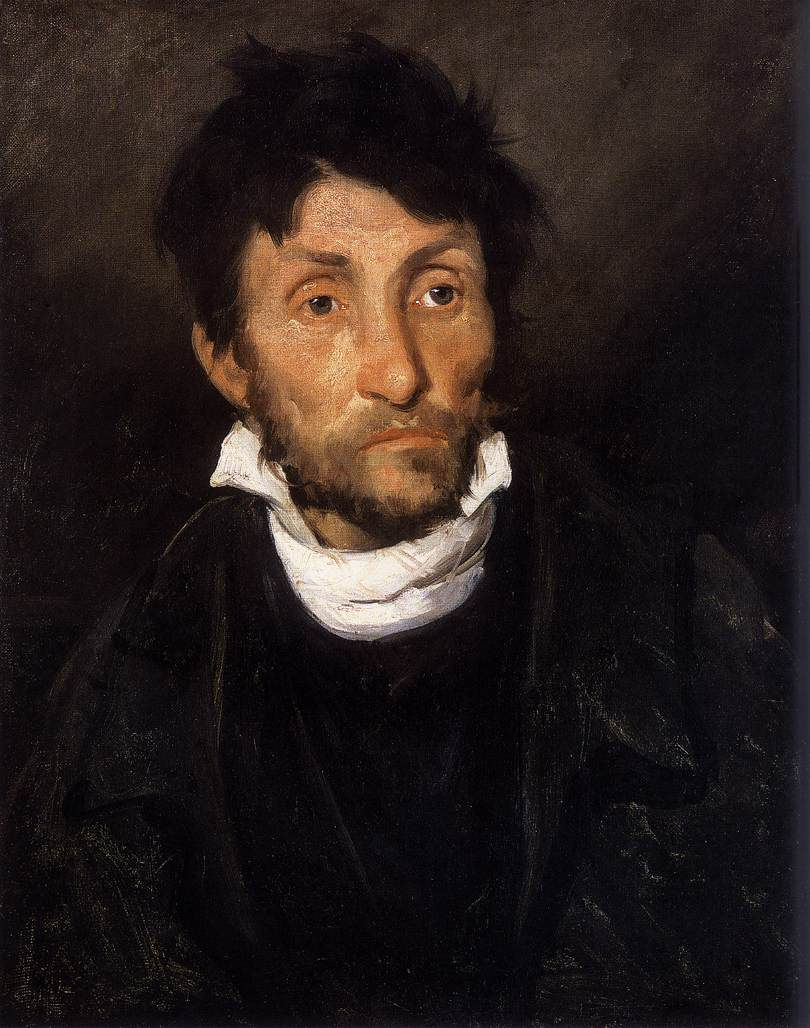
- Artist: Théodore Géricault
- Year: 1822
- Medium: Oil on panel
- Dimensions: 61.2 cm × 50.2 cm (24 in × 19 3/4 in)
- Location: Museum of Fine Arts, Ghent, Ghent

Portrait of a Kleptomaniac or Portrait of an Insane Person (French: L'Aliéné or Portrait d'un Cleptomane aka Le Monomane du Vol) is an 1822 oil painting by Théodore Géricault. It is part of series of ten portraits made for the psychiatrist Étienne-Jean Georget and is currently kept in the Museum of Fine Arts, Ghent, Belgium.

== Background ==
The painting belongs to a series of ten portraits of the insane inmates of Salpêtrière asylum in Paris. Géricault made it near the end of his career and the five remaining portraits from the series represent the painter's last triumph. Psychiatrist Étienne-Jean Georget, one of the founders of social psychiatry, asked Géricault to do these paintings which would represent each of the clinical models of the disease. Georget believed that dementia was a modern disease, which depended in large part on social progress in industrialized countries. He believed that those who were mentally ill needed help. Instead of bringing the ill persons into a classroom to examine their physical characteristics, the doctor instructed Géricault to paint models representing different types of madness. Georget appreciated the objectivity in this series of works that established a link between romantic art and empirical science.

== Description ==
The work was made quickly, which prefigured the concerns of the Impressionists. However, the painting did not belong to Impressionism. At the time, to give dignity to those who were mentally ill was new: they were generally excluded from society, and the previous works represented madmen as possessed creatures or ludicrous people, according to a medieval belief.

Géricault tried to show objectively the patient's face: the empty gaze of the kleptomaniac goes to infinity and his face is rigid, with a neglected beard and dirty neck. The paintings are noteworthy for their bravura style, expressive realism, and for their documenting of the psychological discomfort of individuals, made all the more poignant by the history of insanity in Géricault's family, as well as the artist's own fragile mental health.

== Gallery ==
The four other surviving works in The Portraits of the Insane series are listed below.

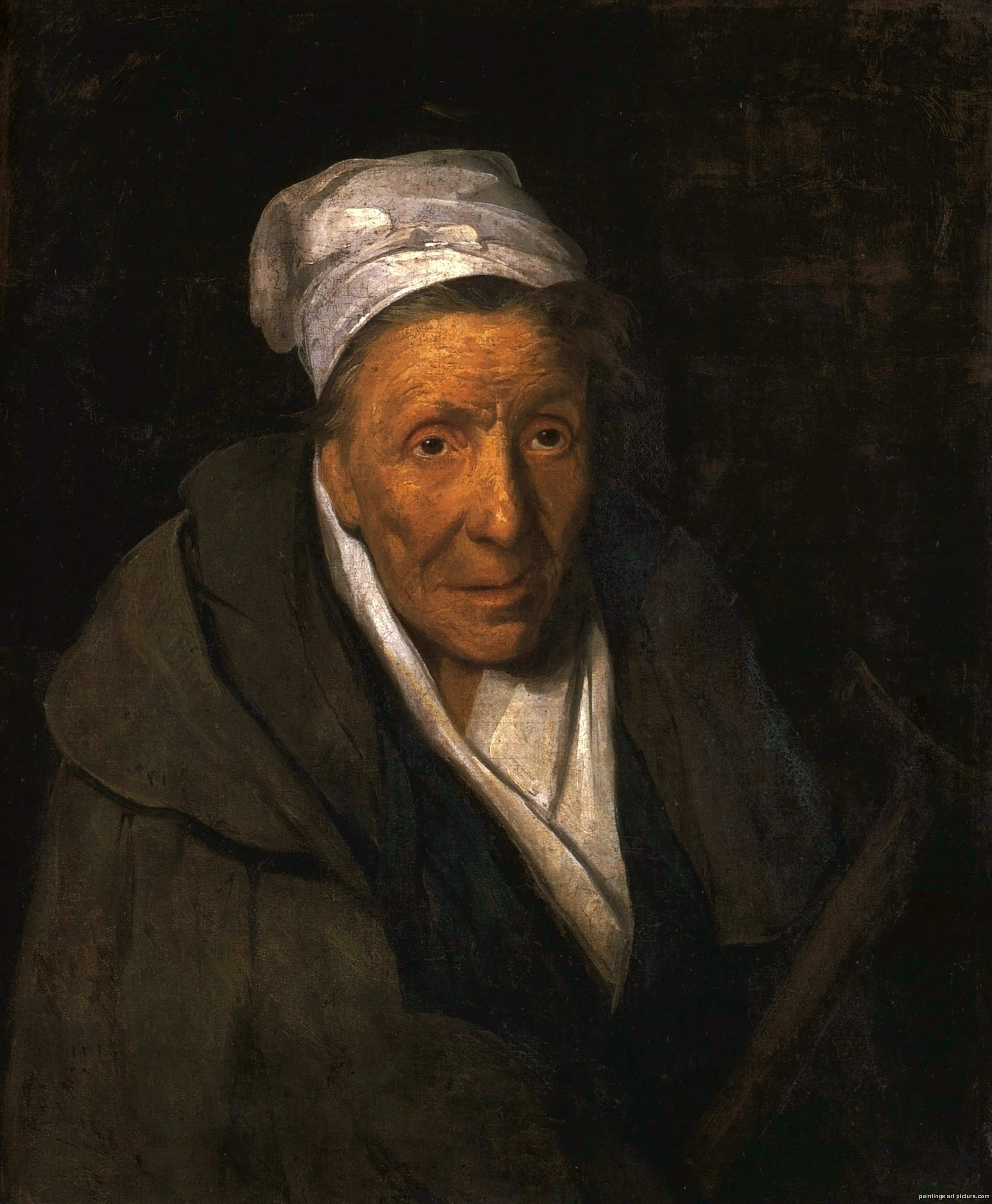
The Woman with a Gambling Mania (French: La Folle Monomane du Jeu), 1822 (Louvre, Paris)

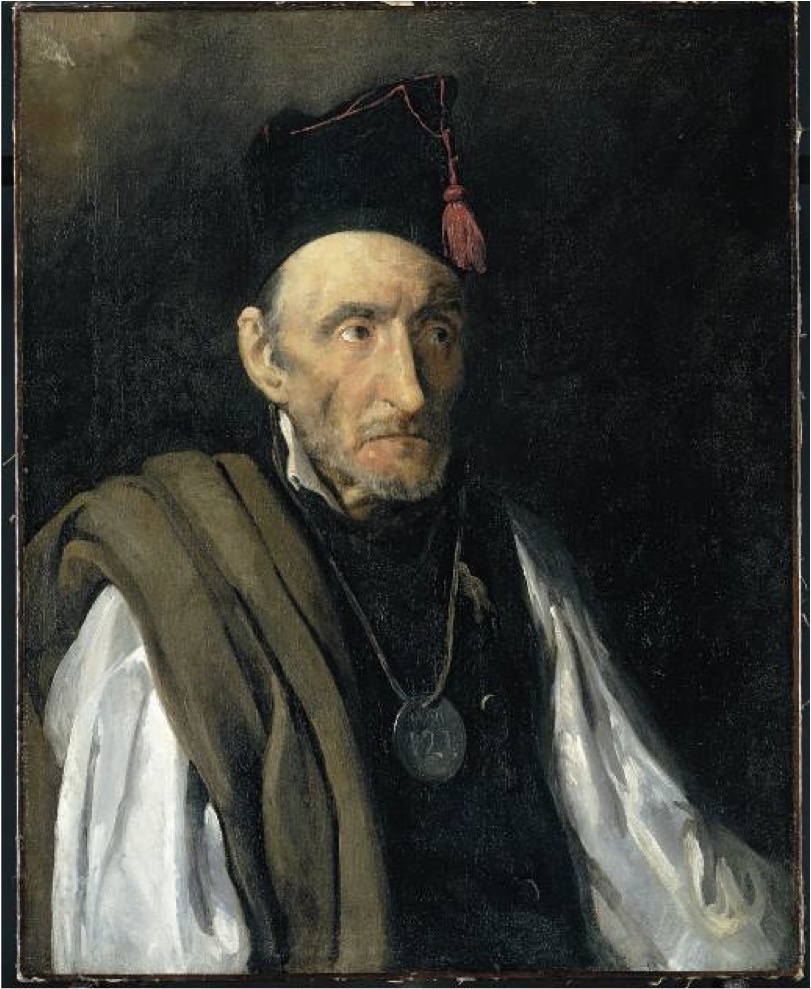
Man Suffering from Delusions of Military Rank (French: Le Monomane du Commandement Militaire), 1822 (Collection Oskar Reinhart am Römerholz, Winterthur)

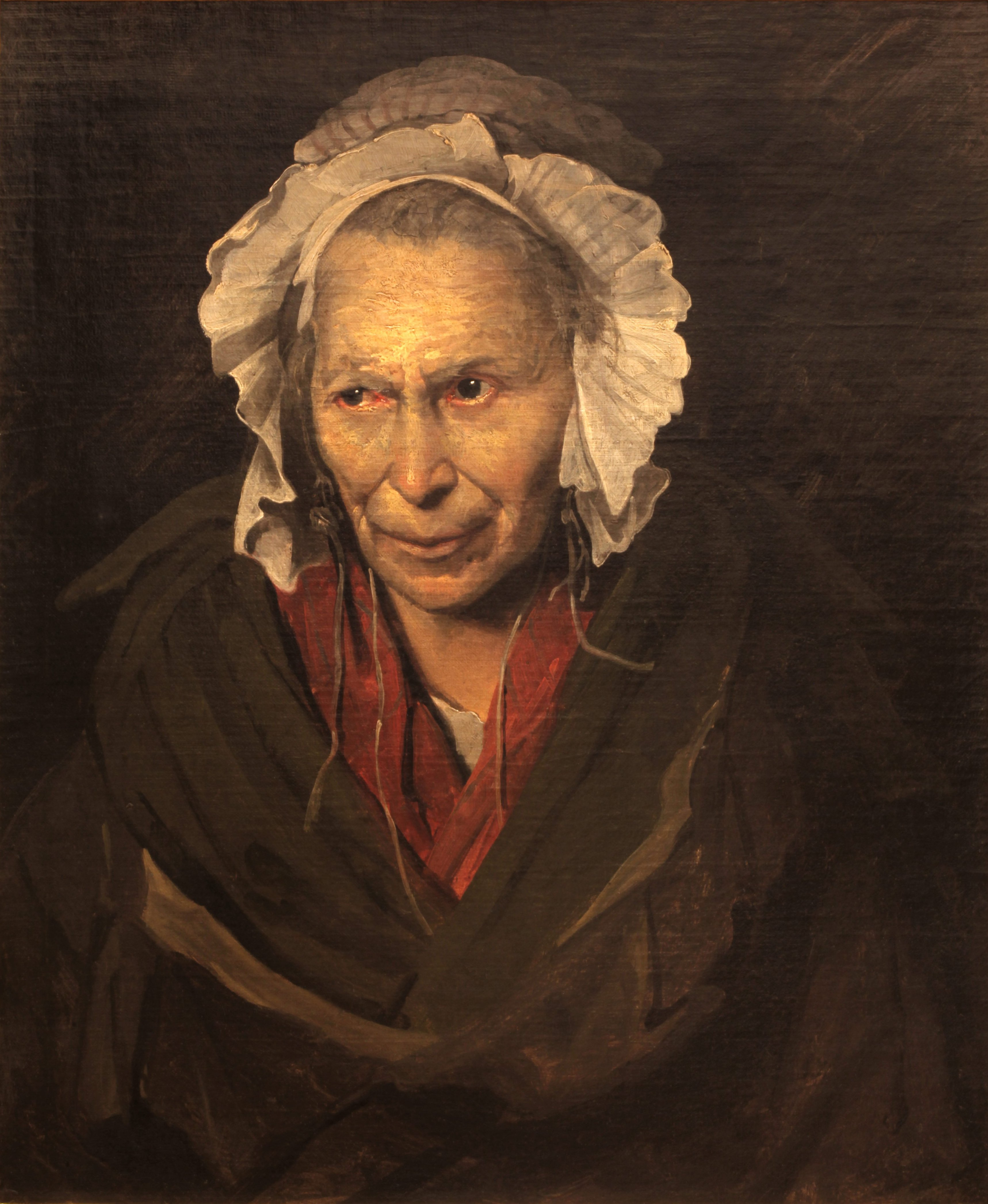
Portrait of a Woman Suffering from Obsessive Envy (French: La Monomane de l'envie), 1822 (Museum of Fine Arts of Lyon)

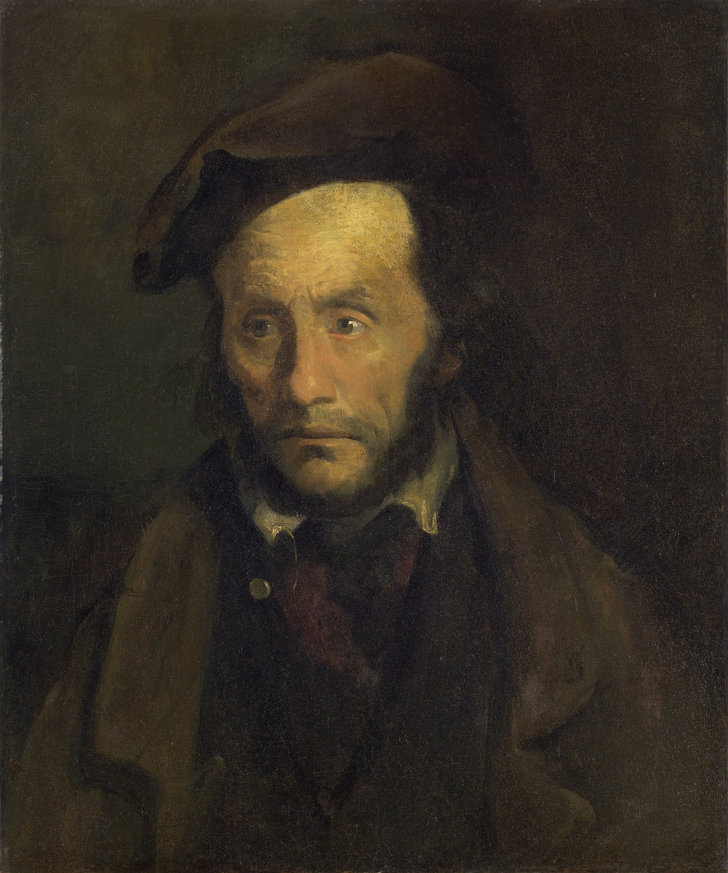
Portrait of a Child Snatcher aka The Child Thief aka The Madman-Kidnapper (French: Le Monomane du vol d'enfants), 1822–1823 (Michele and Donald D’Amour Museum of Fine Arts, Springfield, Massachusetts)
