= Monomaniac of Envy =

1822 painting by Théodore Géricault

- Artist: Théodore Géricault
- Year: 1822
- Type: Oil painting
- Dimensions: 72.1 cm × 58.5 cm (28.4 in × 23.0 in)
- Location: Museum of Fine Arts of Lyon, Lyon

Monomaniac of Envy (Monomane de l’envie), also known by the name of Hyena of Salpêtrière, Portrait of a Woman Suffering from Obsessive Envy, and Manic Envy, is an oil-on-canvas painting by the French Romantic artist Théodore Géricault. Painted as part of his series of ten portraits on the mentally ill, it is one of only five known to survive today. It is currently housed in the Museum of Fine Arts of Lyon, France.

== Background ==
Mental aberration and irrational states of mind interested Romantic artists who questioned Enlightenment rationality. Géricault, like many of his contemporaries, examined the influence of mental states on the human face and shared the belief, common in his time, that a face more accurately revealed character, especially in madness and at the moment of death. In addition to analyzing faces of patients in hospitals and institutions for the criminally insane, he also studied the heads of guillotine victims.

=== Description ===
The Portraits of the Insane depict patients from the Paris mental hospitals La Salpêtrière and Bicêtre. Art historians have described the portraits as significant for their "unprecedented objective sobriety,” observing that they "have a powerful realism that is entirely unaffected by romantic sentiment or artistic dramatization.”

=== Commission and rediscovery ===
The Portraits of the Insane were commissioned by Étienne-Jean Georget, a doctor at La Salpêtrière. The portraits remained largely unknown for decades after their creation, until they were rediscovered in an attic in Baden-Baden, Germany in 1863. The house and portraits belonged to the doctor Adolphe Lacheze. Some sources indicate that Lacheze discovered the portraits, while others claim it was the journalist and art critic Louis Viardot. Viardot assisted Lacheze with selling the portraits.

Viardot described the portraits in a letter from December 6, 1863, which was then published in the Gazette des Beaux-Arts (January 1864). Regarding Monomaniac of Envy, he wrote, "her monomania was not, however, of fury, nor even wickedness, but of envy, of which Voltaire said, ‘She hates the living, courts the mould’ring tomb.’ This unhappy woman could not, for example, see herself, without feeling an inner rage, expressed by a gnashing of the teeth and bloodshot eyes.”

== Technique ==
Each portrait in Géricault's series shows the figure turned slightly to the side, set against a dark background. The simplicity of the compositions and the strong illumination of the heads focuses the attention of the viewer on the faces. The art historian Lorenz Eitner observes that Géricault, instead of “generalizing [his subject’s] features or stressing their eccentricities, recorded their individual appearance with minute attention." Gregor Wedekind and Max Hollein note Géricault's distinctive technique, with "agitated brush strokes, the use of pigment as virtuosic overpainting or pastose crust, and the colours which at times include sulphurous yellow, scarlet red and poisonous green."

Art historians have often emphasized the distinctive facial features of the woman in Monomaniac of Envy, including her "bony cheeks" and "spider veins." Robert Snell also assigns significance to the leftward direction of the woman's gaze, “which given the Western tendency to read paintings from left to right, seems to make it even harder to follow [her gaze] and imagine what might be in [her mind]." Snell also argues that the interplay of the woman's hair and clothing "set up a visual rhythm which suggests physical and emotional lability.” Her red scarf is shaped like the letter "V" and, according to Snell, "works like the warning 'V' of a viper."

== Purpose ==
While the exact purpose of each of these portraits remains unknown, there has been some speculation among scholars. Some side with Viardot and assert that the paintings were meant to serve as documents in Georget's clinical studies. Supporting this claim, Lorenz Eitner notes that "Dr. Georget believed in the symptomatic significance of facial and bodily appearance in the diagnosis of mental disorders” and "in documenting particular cases, it was important to render the physiognomy of the patient with strict objectivity."

Similarly, some commentators suggest that these portraits "were perhaps trying to fulfill the role that photography would take in the medical and legal fields shortly thereafter: that of proof and possibly as a basis for diagnosis." Others, however, note how Géricault was unique in the sense that he incorporated pathos into his portraits. This contradicts the idea that their purpose was primarily scientific.

Finally, some scholars highlight Gericault's own battle with mental health when addressing the purposes of these portraits. Upon his return to Paris in 1821, there are reports that his health began to deteriorate. The spinal injury that he suffered the following year compounded the problem. Thus, some speculate that the portraits "speak to [Géricault’s] fragile mental health," arguing that "in the disfigured and insane he finds something of himself, something that is not only, but also, the painter’s alter ego."

== Legacy ==
Géricault's Monomaniac of Envy has inspired a number of other works. Marlene Dumas's 2011 painting Obsessive Envy is based on Géricault's composition. It only differs in color scheme, clarity, and cropping. It is thought that the painting's blurriness is indicative of a seizure.

Jennifer Metzker published "Géricault Paints a Portrait of a Woman Suffering from Obsessive Envy" in her 2021 poetry collection dedicated to the mentally ill titled Hypergraphia and Other Failed Attempts at Paradise. It focuses on the woman's detailed facial features, including her "sly grin" and "red-rimmed lids."

== Gallery ==
The four other surviving works in the Portraits of the Insane series are pictured below.

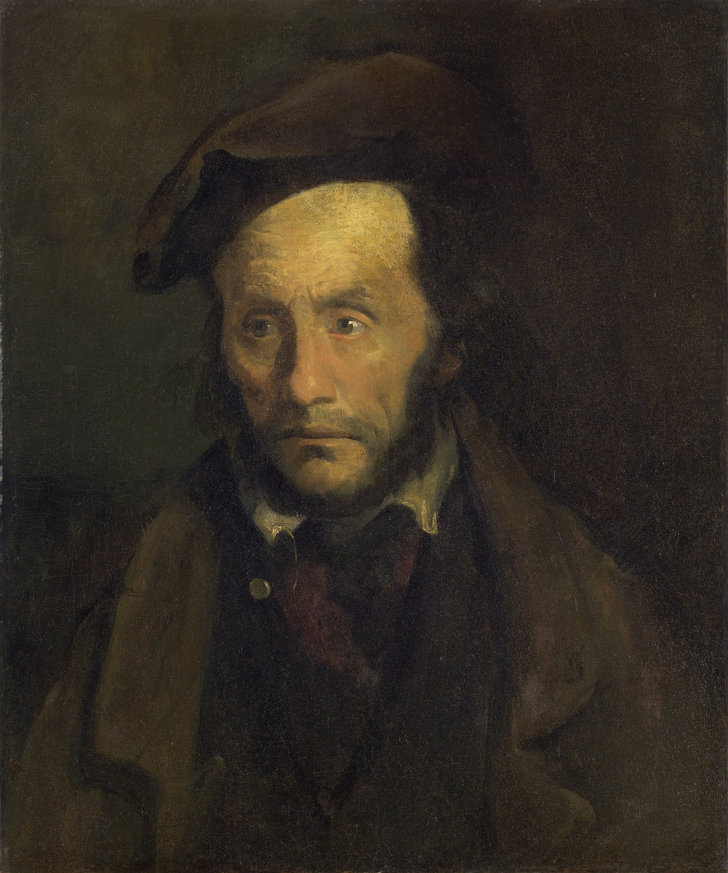
Monomane du vol d’enfants (Monomaniac of Child Abduction); Also known as The Madman-Kidnapper

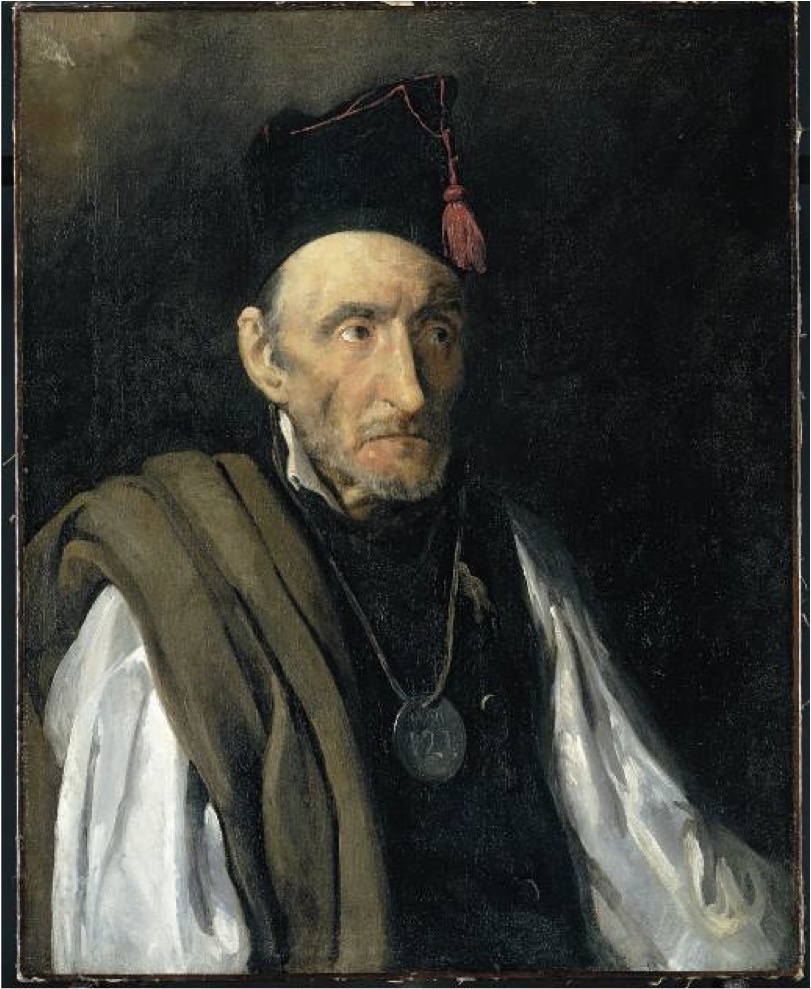
Monomane du commandement militaire (Monomaniac of Military Command); Also known as A Man Suffering from Delusions of Military Rank

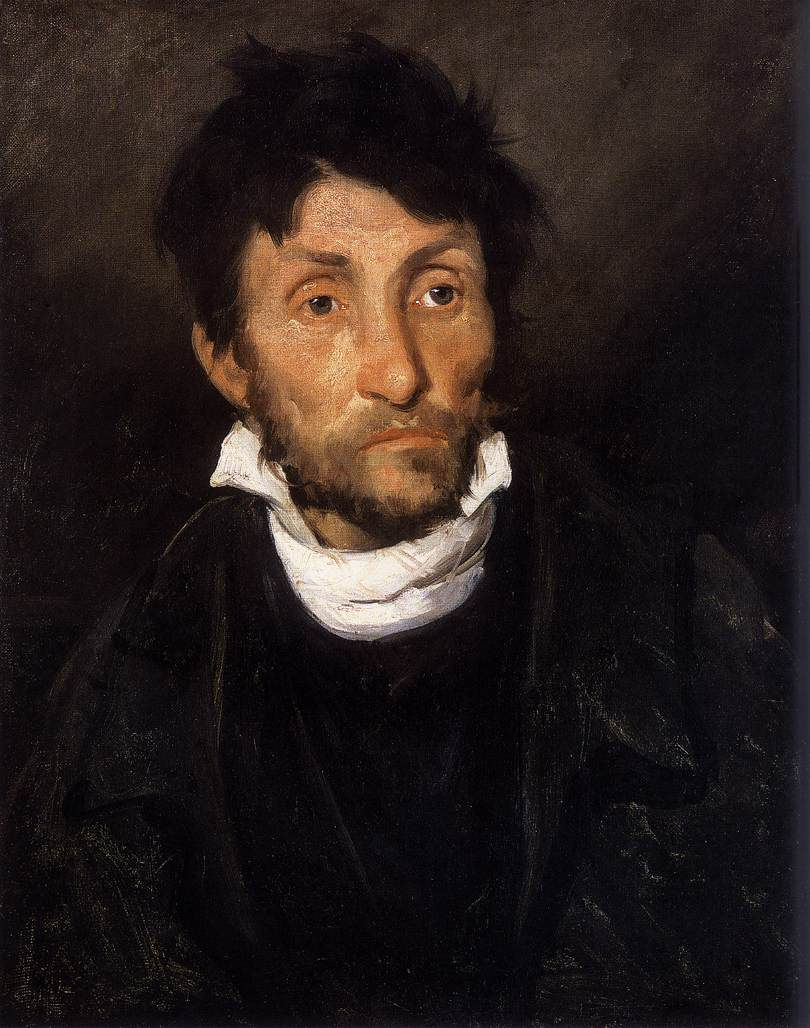
Monomane du vol (Monomanic of Theft); Also known as Portrait of a Kleptomaniac

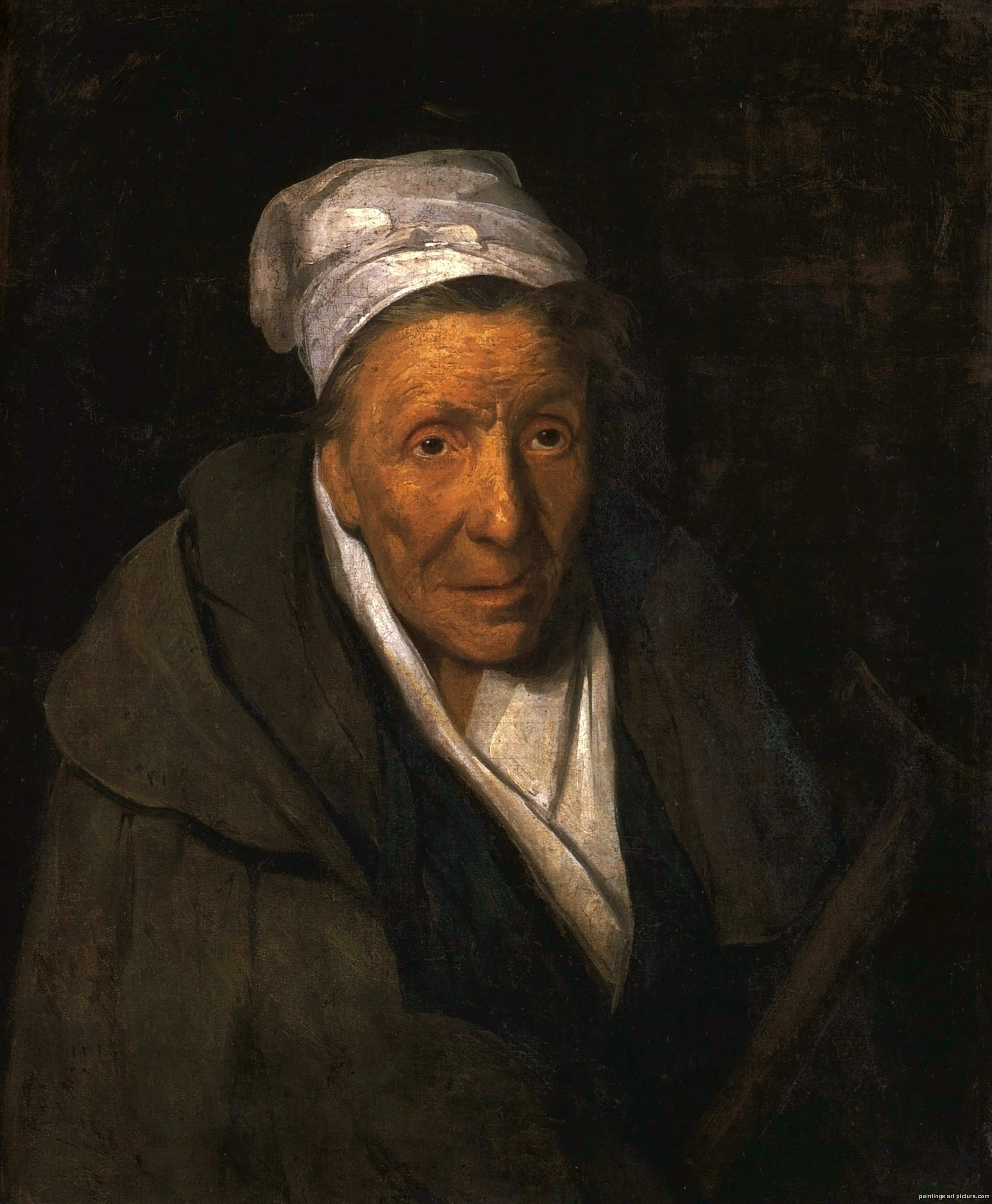
La Monomane du jeu (Monomaniac of Gambling); Also known as The Woman with a Gambling Mania
