= Étienne-Jean Georget =

French psychiatrist

Étienne-Jean Georget (2 April 1795 – 14 May 1828) was a French psychiatrist. He is known for writing on monomania. He is also the pioneer of forensic psychiatry, and was the first psychiatrist to discuss the defence of insanity to criminal charges.

== Biography ==
Georget was born in Vernou-sur-Brenne (Indre-et-Loire), into a poor farming family. He was poorly educated, which he felt handicapped his career.

He studied medicine in Tours, then in Paris where he was a student of Philippe Pinel and Jean-Étienne Dominique Esquirol. From 1815 he worked at the Salpêtrière hospital. In 1820 he attained fame with his book De la folie ("On insanity").

Georget specialized in psychopathology. He refined and clarified Pinel's nosology of mental illnesses. He distinguished several types of monomania such as "theomania" (religious obsession), "erotomania" (sexual obsession), "demonomania" (obsession with evil) and "homicidal monomania" (obsession with murder). He also held the view that it is possible for criminals to be held legally responsible for their crimes by reason of insanity.

Georget ridiculed the idea of the uterine origin of hysteria and maintained that it was a disease of men as well as women.

He was a member of the Académie Nationale de Médecine and of the Medical Society of London.

The theoretical work of Georget was influential in establishing the view that 19th century writers of romantic fiction took of the insane and of criminals.

Georget died of pulmonary tuberculosis at the age of 33.

=== The Géricault portraits ===
In the early 1820s, he commissioned Théodore Géricault, a former patient, to paint a series of portraits so that his students could study the facial traits of "monomaniacs", as he preferred using such images to having patients in the classroom. Between 1821 and 1824, Géricault created ten paintings, of which five have survived. They include those of a kidnapper, a gambling addict, and a woman "consumed with envy". The most famous is Portrait of a kleptomaniac.

== Works ==
=== Books ===
- De la folie: considérations sur cette maladie, p. PR4, at Google Books (1820) (On insanity)
  - Postel, Jacques (ed.). De la folie. Toulouse: Privat (1972)
- De la physiologie du système nerveux et spécialement du cerveau: recherches sur les maladies nerveuses en général, et en particulier sur le siége, la nature et le traitement de lʹhystérie, de lʹhypochondrie, de l'épilepsie et de lʹasthme convulsif (1821) Volume 1 on Google Books
- Examen médical des procès criminels des nommés Léger, Feldtmann, Lecouffe, Jean-Pierre et Papavoine, dans lesquels l'aliénation mentale a été alléguée comme moyen de défense, suivi de quelques considérations médico-légales sur la liberté morale, p. PP8, at Google Books (1825)
- Discussion médico-légale sur la folie ou aliénation mentale, suivie de l'examen du procès criminel d'Henriette Cornier, et de plusieurs autres procès dans lesquels cette maladie a été alléguée comme moyen de défense on Gallica (1826)
- Des maladies mentales, considérées dans leurs rapports avec la législation civile et criminelle (1827) (On mental diseases, considered in relation with civil and criminal laws)
- Nouvelle discussion médico-légale sur la folie ou aliénation mentale, suivie de l'examen de plusieurs procès criminels dans lesquels cette maladie a été alléguée comme moyen de défense, p. PP4, at Google Books (1828) (New forensic discussion on insanity or mental alienation, followed by an examination of a number of criminal trials where that disease was used as a means of defense)

A more complete list can be found in Semelaigne.

=== Dictionary articles (selection) ===
- Articles in Adelon, Nicolas Philibert (ed.). Dictionnaire de médecine. Paris: Béchet jeune: "Délire"; "Folie"; "Hystérie"; "Névrose"
