= Annick Lodge and Greenville =

Estate house in North Ayrshire, Scotland

Coordinates: 55°38′32″N 4°36′35″W

Designations

Inventory of Gardens and Designed Landscapes in Scotland
- Official name: Annick Lodge
- Designated: 30 March 2006
- Reference no.: GDL00014

Annick Lodge is an estate between Perceton and Cunninghamhead in North Ayrshire, Scotland.

== History ==
Annick Lodge (previously Annack, Annoch or Annock) and estate was built for Royal Navy Captain Alexander Montgomerie (May 24, 1744 - July 8, 1802), the brother-german of Hugh Montgomerie, 12th Earl of Eglinton. The lodge stands on the site of the old mansion described by Pont as "a proper building, veill planted, the inheritance of Blaire, Laird of Adamtoune." The 11th Earl had died without male issue so the Earldom had passed to Hugh, son of Alexander Montgomerie of Coilsfield (Robertson 1908). The Right Hon. David Boyle, Lord Boyle of Kelburn married Elizabeth, eldest daughter of Alexander at Annick Lodge in 1804. Elizabeth, wife of Alexander Montgomerie Esq., died 13 February 1839; her beloved daughter Frances died 25th Sept 1858 and both were buried at Dreghorn Parish cemetery.

The second laird of Annick Lodge, William Eglinton, who succeeded in 1802, was Lieutenant Colonel of the Ayrshire Yeomanry Cavalry, a magistrate and deputy-lieutenant of Ayrshire.

One of the sons of his family, Admiral John Eglinton Montgomerie CB, wrote a vocabulary of the American Indians of the Columbia River and Puget's Sound in 1848. Another son, Captain Thomas George Montgomerie of the Bengal Engineers was responsible for the mapping of the Tibetan Mountains and the naming of the second highest mountain in the world K2, the K standing for Karakoram, as part of the Great Trigonometrical Survey of India under Major-General Sir Andrew Scott Waugh. Major William Eglinton and Mrs Montgomerie attended the famous 1839 Eglinton Tournament in what is now Eglinton Country Park and were allotted a seat in the Grand Stand. Susanna Fraser Anderson, wife of William Eglinton Montgomerie of Annick Lodge, died 13 October 1884 age 84 yrs and is buried in Dreghorn parish cemetery.

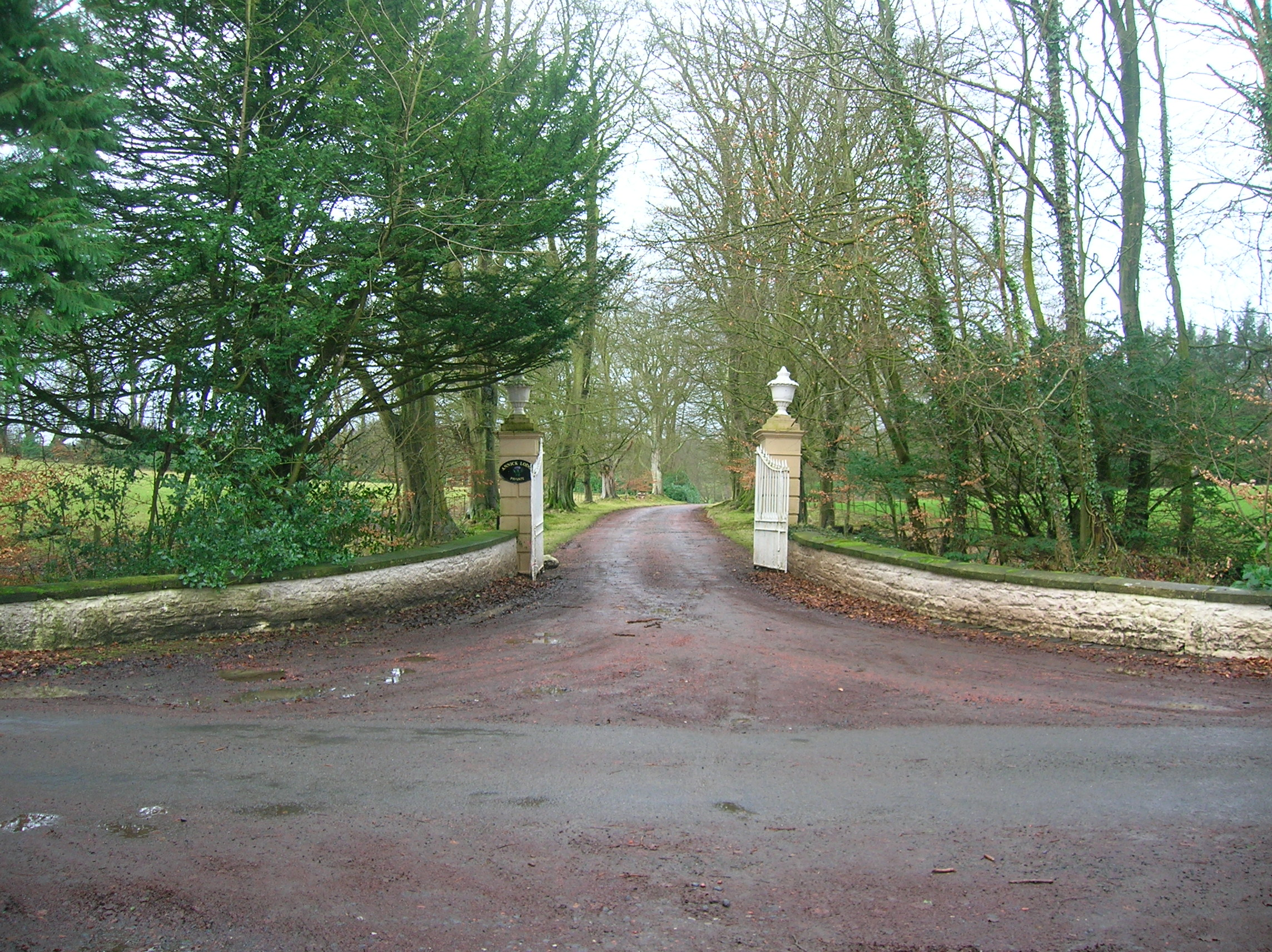
Annick Lodge gates and drive.

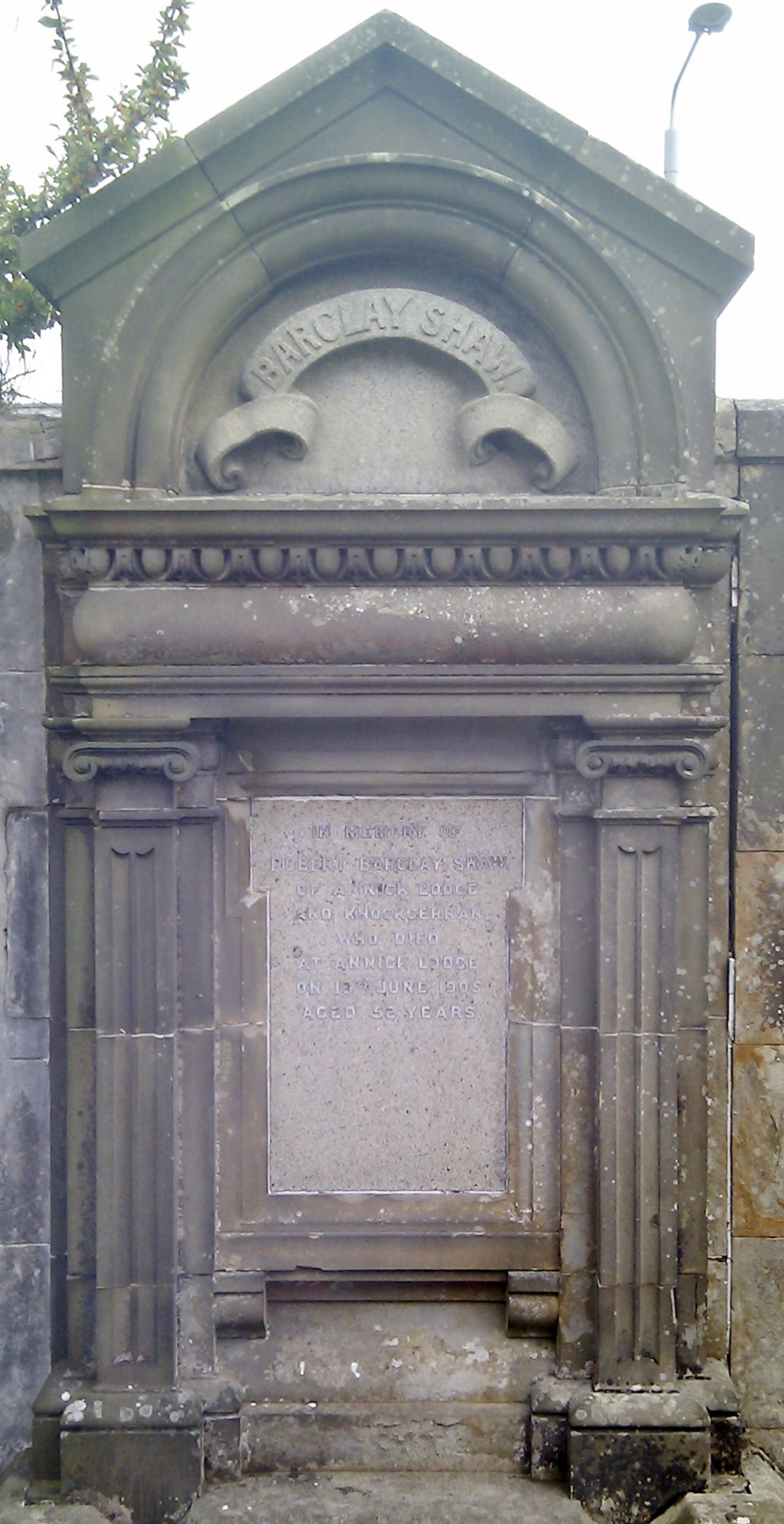
Gravestone of Robert Barclay Shaw of Annick Lodge

In 1800 Annick Lodge was visited by John Stoddart on his return from his tour of Scotland. Stoddart calls the new house "a complete specimen of the English ferme ornee". Hussey states that this term describes a country estate laid out partly according to aesthetic principles and partly for farming. Ferme ornee were an expression in landscape gardening of the Romantic Movement of 18th-century Europe, i.e. a working farm, domestic animals, natural landscape joined with follies and grottoes, statuary and classical texts combined with avenued walks, flowing water, lakes, areas of light and shade, special plantings and inspirational views.

The house itself is decorated with a porch supported upon Corinthian pillars, and surmounted by a facade bearing sculptured urns at its three angles. The tympanum is filled in with a heraldic shield and scroll-work in high relief (Millar 1885). Annick Lodge estate is partly on the site of a previous small estate, called Greenvale, Greenville or Greenval. Aiton records that Annack-lodge had gardens with hot-houses, greenhouse, etc. as early as 1811. The estate had a common boundary march with the Cunninghamhead estate.

The river bed here at Annick Bridge contains animal fossils and some fine specimens were removed by members of the Kilmarnock Glenfield Ramblers. It is now very rural (2006) despite the previous mining and quarrying activity and the presence of the old railway and abandoned estate coal siding nearby. A fine three arched sandstone railway viaduct on the old Glasgow and South Western Railway, later the London, Midland and Scottish, is located just upstream from the Annick Bridge. It was restored to good order in 2005 / 2006, despite being redundant.

The area beside the northern bank of the Annick Water is known as Friersmill Holm. The 'Reid Friers' were the Red Friars, better known as the Knights Templar and the mill in this vicinity would have been one of many belonging to the order in Scotland, however no indication of its exact site is found on the OS or any other old maps of the district. Strawhorn relates that the 'Friersmiln' belonged to the Carmelite friars at Irvine and held the multures, a fixed proportion of the tenant's grain, paid to the miller by the suckener to grind the corn, of Armsheugh, Roddinghill and Holehouse.

The Annick Lodge policies contain a number of fine specimen trees, especially some very large common oaks.

=== Greenville ===
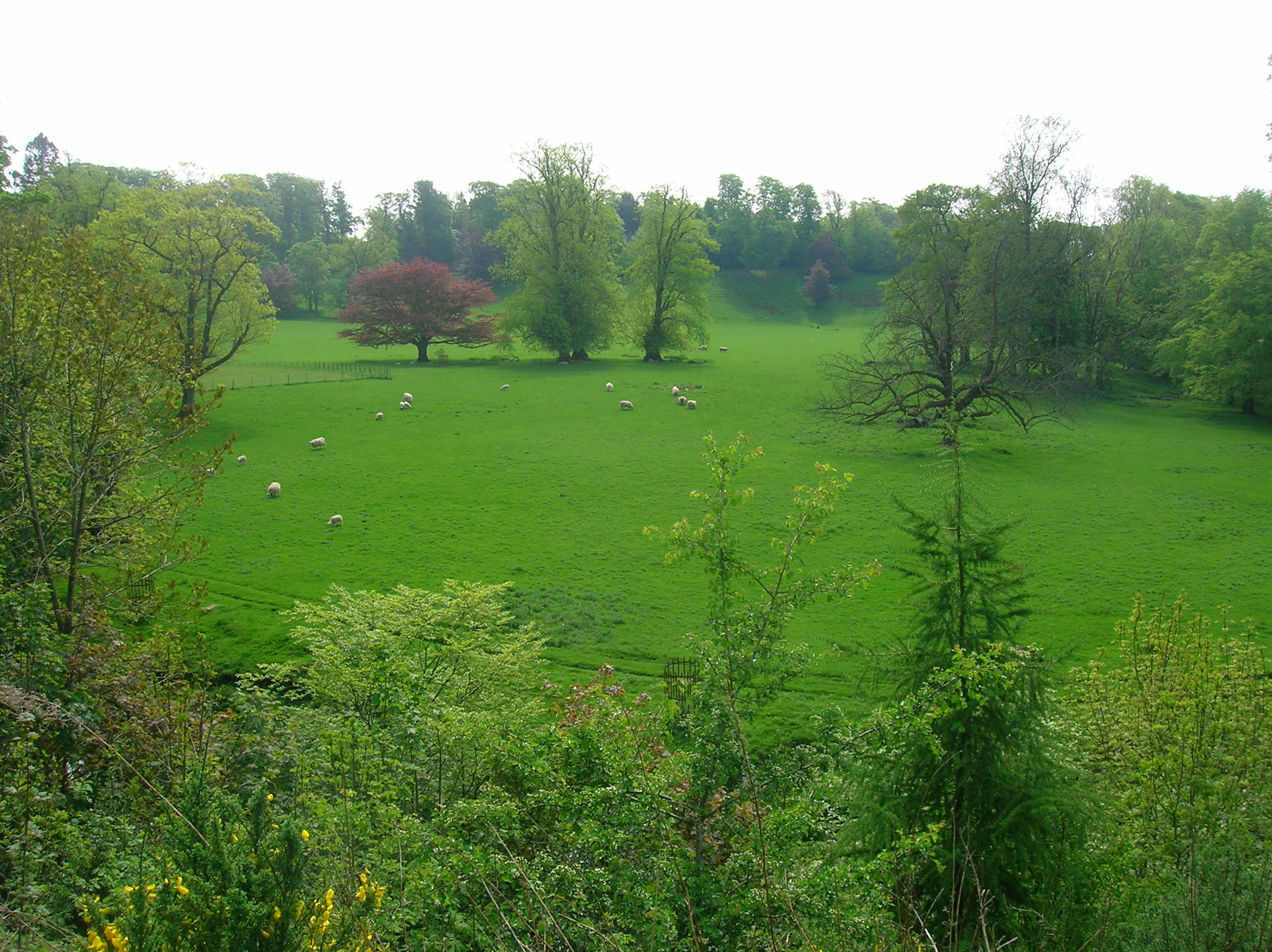
A view of the Annick Holm in 2008.

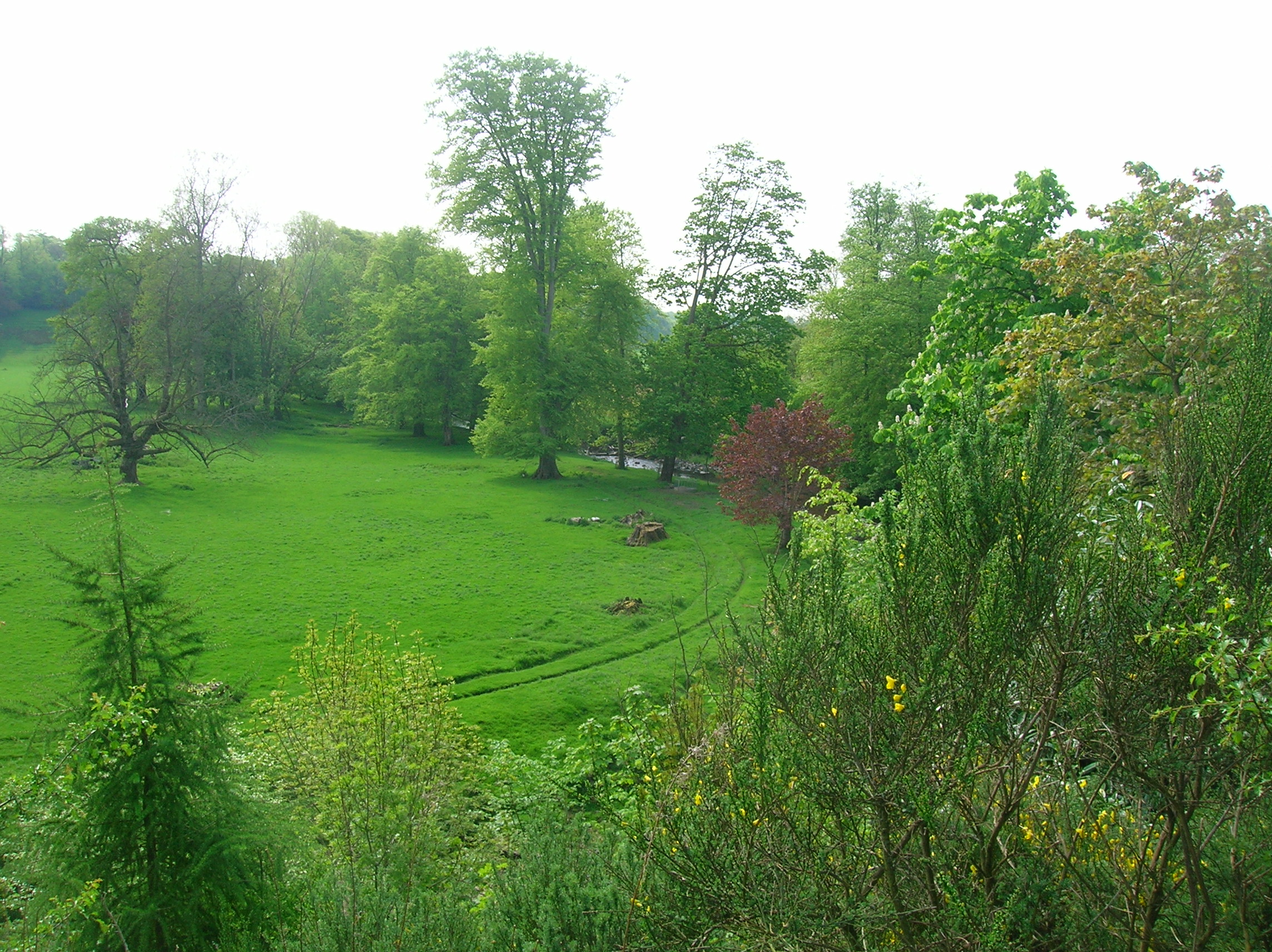
Another view with the Annick Water visible.

The name of a property called Greenville is found on the 1775 Armstrong map and Aiton refers to this country seat as Greenvale in 1811. It is Greenval on Ainslie's 1821 map and Dobie (1876) states that the name was Greenvale. The estate was made up of all the mains lands of Over-Pearston, sometimes called Pearston-Blair, acquired by Alexander Montgomerie, second son of Alexander Montgomerie of Skelmorlie and Coilsfield, in 1790. His mother was Lillias Montgomerie, heiress of Skelmorlie and he was born in 1744. He also purchased the old estate of Braehead and the lands of Roddinghill (previously Redenhill in 1775 and Ruddinghill in 1832), giving the name Annick Lodge to the collective whole. Part of the old 'proper building' of Pont's day (17th century) was exposed during repair work on Annick Lodge in the 1870s. lodge had gardens with hot-houses, greenhouse, etc. as early as 1811. The estate had a common boundary march with the Cunninghamhead estate.

== Annick Lodge's landscape components ==
The Components of the designed landscape are from the 18th and 19th centuries, superseding earlier landscape phases of which little is known. As regarding listed buildings, Annick Lodge is Category A, the Gateway (See photograph) is Category B and the Bridge near Annick Lodge (footbridge to the northwest of the Lodge) is Category C.

=== Architectural features ===
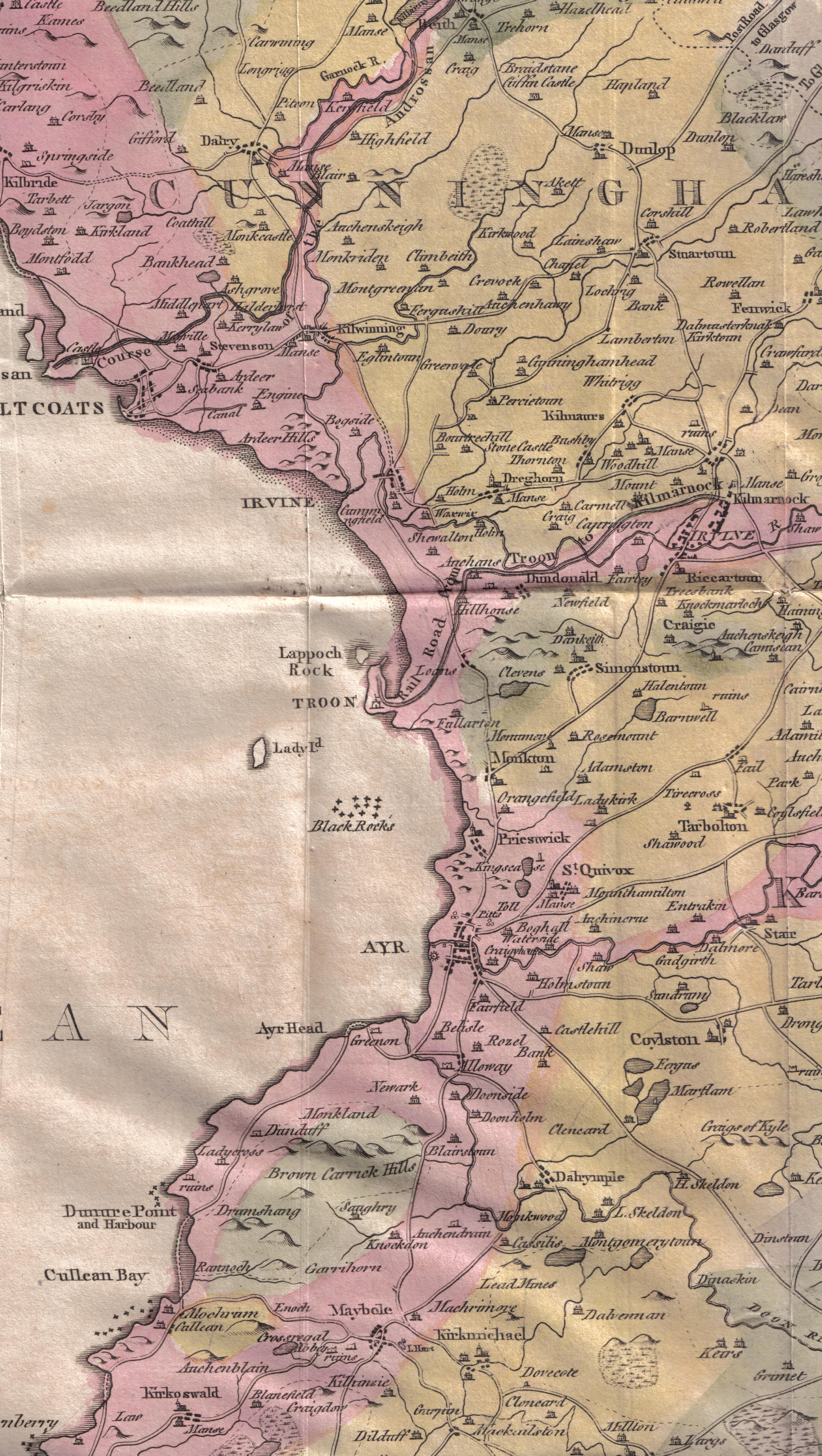
William Aiton's map of 1811 showing Greenvale (sic)

Around 100 yards east of the footbridge, between the house and the riverbank, there is a gravestone of red sandstone inscribed: "Philip of SP-Annie 1939–1947".

== See also ==
- Cunninghamhead
- Cunninghamhead, Perceton and Annick Lodge
- Cunninghamhead Estate
- Perceton
- Clan Montgomery
