= Robert Patrick (disambiguation) =

Robert Patrick (born 1958) is an American actor.

Robert Patrick may also refer to:

- Robert Patrick (playwright), American playwright, poet, lyricist, short-story writer and novelist
- Bob Patrick, American baseball player

== See also ==
- Robert William Cochran-Patrick, Scottish politician
