= Duncan Campbell (Unionist politician) =

British politician

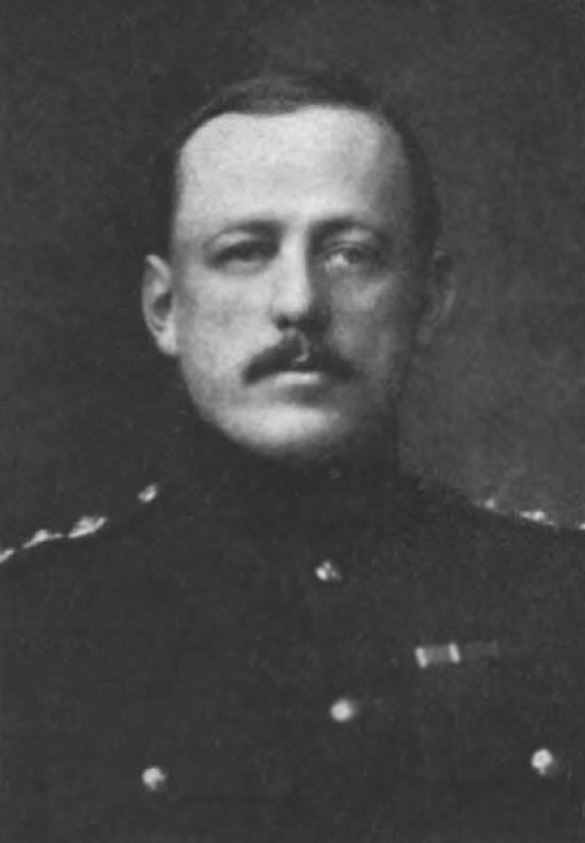
Duncan Frederick Campbell in a photograph published in The Lancashire Fusiliers Annual 1916 following his death in the First World War.

Duncan Frederick Campbell DSO (28 April 1876 Simcoe, Ontario, Canada – 4 September 1916) was a Canadian-born British politician and soldier. He served as a Unionist Member of Parliament for North Ayrshire and died while fighting in World War I.

== Life ==
Campbell was commissioned a second lieutenant in the Lancashire Fusiliers on 23 November 1898, followed by promotion to lieutenant on 27 September 1899. He served with the 2nd Battalion of his regiment in the Second Boer War 1899–1901, including as part of the Ladysmith Relief Force, and was slightly wounded at the engagement at Venters Spruit (20 January 1900), for which he was created a Companion of the Distinguished Service Order (DSO). He was promoted captain, 5 October 1901.

Campbell fought Mid Lanarkshire for the Conservatives in 1906. Campbell entered the House of Commons at a by-election, 20 December 1911, defeating Andrew Macbeth Anderson QC, who sought re-election on being appointed Solicitor General for Scotland. Anderson, in accordance with the constitutional arrangements of the day, was obliged to resign as an MP and fight a by-election on being appointed a law officer of the Crown. The contest was dominated by the government's legislation on National Insurance and the uncertainties this legislation would produce for individual electors, particularly those of small manufacturers and shopkeepers. Although there was no Labour candidate, Anderson was thought to have lost some support among working-class voters because of his opposition to Labour candidates in other recent elections. After a tight contest, Campbell captured the seat by a majority of 271 votes.

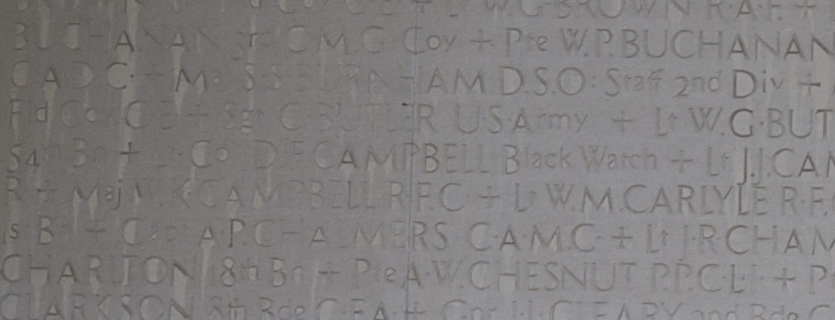
Duncan Campbell's name on the Soldiers' Tower at the University of Toronto

He was wounded at the first battle of Ypres in November 1914 while serving with the Black Watch; he lost his left arm and was invalided for a year. As a lieutenant colonel in the Duke of Wellington's Regiment, commanding 2nd/7th Bn, he was wounded by a mine on the Western Front and died of his wounds at Southwold, Suffolk on 4 September 1916. He is buried in Kilmarnock Cemetery, Ayrshire. Campbell is commemorated on Panel 8 of the Parliamentary War Memorial in Westminster Hall, one of 22 MPs that died during World War I to be named on that memorial. Campbell is one of 19 MPs who fell in the war who are commemorated by heraldic shields in the Commons Chamber. A further act of commemoration came with the unveiling in 1932 of a manuscript-style illuminated book of remembrance for the House of Commons, which includes a short biographical account of the life and death of Campbell.

Parliament of the United Kingdom
Preceded by Andrew Anderson	Member of Parliament for North Ayrshire; 1911–1916	Succeeded by Aylmer Hunter-Weston
