= 1911 North Ayrshire by-election =

By-election in the United Kingdom

← Dec. 1910	20 December 1911	1916 →

Constituency of North Ayrshire
- Registered: 16,926
- Turnout: 84.9% (▼0.4%)
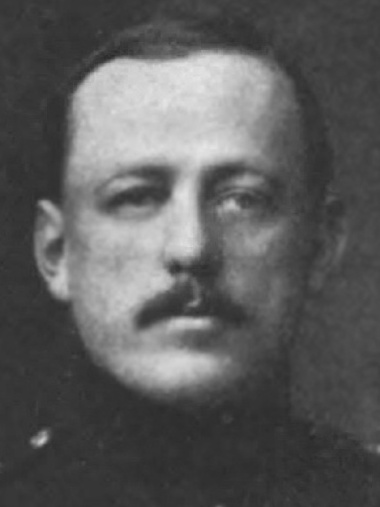
	First party	Second party
		Lib
Candidate	Duncan Campbell	Andrew Anderson
Party	Unionist	Liberal
Popular vote	7,318	7,047
Percentage	50.9%	49.1%
Swing	▲2.1%	▼2.1%
MP before election
Andrew Anderson
Unionist
Subsequent MP
Duncan Campbell
Unionist

The 1911 North Ayrshire by-election was a Parliamentary by-election held on 20 December 1911. The constituency returned one Member of Parliament (MP) to the House of Commons of the United Kingdom, elected by the first past the post voting system.

== Vacancy ==
Andrew Anderson, the Liberal MP since he gained the seat in January 1910 from the Unionists, was appointed Solicitor General for Scotland, a law officer of the Crown. In accordance with the constitutional arrangements of the day, he was obliged to resign as an MP and fight a by-election.

== Electoral history ==
General election December 1910: Ayrshire North
Party	Candidate	Votes	%	±%
Liberal	Andrew Anderson	7,286	51.2	+6.8
Conservative	Duncan Campbell	6,932	48.8	+6.1
Majority		354	2.4	+0.7
Turnout		14,218	85.3	+0.6
Liberal hold		Swing	+0.4	

== Candidates ==
Anderson's Unionist opponent was again Capt. Duncan Frederick Campbell who had stood here last time. He had contested Mid-Lanark in 1906 and Paisley in January 1910 without success.

There was no Labour candidate, even though they had contested the seat in 1906 and January 1910, finishing a poor third on both occasions.

== Campaign ==
The contest was dominated by the government's legislation on National Insurance and the uncertainties this legislation would produce for individual electors, particularly small manufacturers and shopkeepers.

== Result ==
The Conservative Party gained the seat.

By-Election 20 December 1911: Ayrshire North
Party	Candidate	Votes	%	±%
Conservative	Duncan Campbell	7,318	50.9	+2.1
Liberal	Andrew Anderson	7,047	49.1	−2.1
Majority		271	1.8	N/A
Turnout		14,365	84.9	−0.4
Conservative gain from Liberal		Swing	+2.1	

Although there was no Labour candidate, Anderson was thought to have lost some support among working-class voters because of his opposition to Labour candidates in other recent elections. After six years of Liberal government, the electors of North Ayrshire reverted to their more traditional allegiances, perhaps rebelling against the background of the rapid social changes being introduced by H H Asquith's reforming administration.

== Aftermath ==
After the election, Anderson agreed to be re-adopted as prospective Liberal candidate for North Ayrshire, expressing a wish to contest the seat again. A General Election was due to take place by the end of 1915. By the autumn of 1914, the following candidates had been adopted to contest that election. Due to the outbreak of war, the election never took place.

- Unionist Party: Duncan Campbell
- Liberal Party: Andrew Anderson

Campbell was killed in action in 1916.
