= Hugh Elliot (MP) =

British politician (1848–1932)

The Honourable Hugh Frederick Hislop Elliot (31 February 1848 – 30 April 1932), was a British Liberal and Liberal Unionist politician who sat in the House of Commons from 1885 to 1892.

== Biography ==
Elliot was the third son of William Elliot-Murray-Kynynmound, 3rd Earl of Minto, and his wife Emma Eleanor Elizabeth, daughter of General Sir Thomas Hislop, 1st Baronet. He was educated at Trinity College, Cambridge. He was a Clerk in the House of Commons and was private secretary to William Patrick Adam, M.P. First Commissioner of Works from 1873 to 1874.

Elliott entered Parliament for Ayrshire North in 1885 as a Liberal. However, he opposed William Ewart Gladstone's Home Rule policy and was re-elected as a Liberal Unionist in 1886. He continued to represent the constituency until 1892, when he was the unsuccessful candidate at Glasgow St. Rollox.

Elliott died in April 1932, aged 84.

Elliot married Mary Euphemia Long, daughter of Colonel Samuel Long, in 1879. They had one son and two daughters. His wife survived him by two years and died in October 1934. Gilbert Elliot-Murray-Kynynmound, 4th Earl of Minto, and Arthur Elliot were his elder brothers.

== See also ==
- Earl of Minto

== Notes ==
Parliament of the United Kingdom
Preceded by Robert William Cochran-Patrick	Member of Parliament for Ayrshire North; 1885–1892	Succeeded by Thomas Cochrane
