= William Finnie (MP) =

Scottish lawyer and Liberal Party politician

William Finnie (6 November 1827 in Kilmarnock – 3 December 1899 in St Leonards-on-Sea) was a Scottish lawyer and Liberal Party politician.

== Life ==
The third son of James Finnie, a merchant in London, Lisbon and Rio de Janeiro, and Mary Ann Brown, he was educated at Merchiston Castle Academy, King's College London, and Trinity College, Cambridge.

He was called to the bar at the Inner Temple in 1853 but never practiced.

He was a justice of the peace for Ayrshire.

He was elected as Liberal Member of Parliament for North Ayrshire at the 1868 general election but was defeated at the 1874 election. He married Antoinette BURNARD d/o George BURNARD in 1853

Parliament of the United Kingdom
New constituency Ayrshire divided	Member of Parliament for North Ayrshire; 1868 – 1874	Succeeded by Roger Montgomerie
