= North Ayrshire (UK Parliament constituency) =

Parliamentary constituency in the United Kingdom, 1868–1918

- Former county constituency for the House of Commons
- Subdivision: Ayrshire

1868–1918
- Seats: One
- Created from: Ayrshire
- Replaced by: Bute and Northern Ayrshire and Kilmarnock

North Ayrshire was a county constituency of the House of Commons of the Parliament of the United Kingdom from 1868 until 1918. It returned one Member of Parliament (MP), using the first-past-the-post voting system.

== Boundaries ==
The Representation of the People (Scotland) Act 1868 provided that the new North Ayrshire constituency was to consist of the District of Cunningham, consisting of the parishes of Ardrossan, Dalry, Dreghorn, Fenwick, Irvine, Kilbirnie, Kilmarnock, Kilmaurs, Kilwinning, Largs, Loudoun, Stevenston, Stewarton, West Kilbride and Beith, and the parish of Dunlop so far as situated within the County of Ayr.

== Members of Parliament ==
Election	Member	Party
1868	William Finnie	Liberal
1874	Roger Montgomerie	Conservative
1880	Robert Cochran-Patrick	Conservative
1885	Hugh Elliot	Liberal
1886	Hugh Elliot	Liberal Unionist
1892	Thomas Cochrane	Liberal Unionist
1910	Andrew Anderson	Liberal
1911	Duncan Campbell	Unionist
1916	Aylmer Hunter-Weston	Unionist
1918	constituency abolished	

== Election results ==
=== Elections in the 1860s ===
General election 1868: North Ayrshire
Party	Candidate	Votes	%	±%
Liberal	William Finnie	1,397	51.4	
Conservative	Roger Montgomerie	1,322	48.6	
Majority		75	2.8	
Turnout		2,719	84.5	
Registered electors		3,219		
Liberal win (new seat)				

=== Elections in the 1870s ===
General election 1874: North Ayrshire
Party	Candidate	Votes	%	±%
Conservative	Roger Montgomerie	1,562	54.6	+6.0
Liberal	William Finnie	1,301	45.4	−6.0
Majority		261	9.2	N/A
Turnout		2,863	84.0	−0.5
Registered electors		3,407		
Conservative gain from Liberal		Swing	+6.0	

=== Elections in the 1880s ===
John Balfour

General election 1880: North Ayrshire
Party	Candidate	Votes	%	±%
Conservative	Robert Cochran-Patrick	1,636	50.9	−3.7
Liberal	John Balfour	1,581	49.1	+3.7
Majority		55	1.8	−7.4
Turnout		3,217	88.3	+4.3
Registered electors		3,642		
Conservative hold		Swing	−3.7	

General election 1885: North Ayrshire
Party	Candidate	Votes	%	±%
Liberal	Hugh Elliot	5,700	54.6	+5.5
Conservative	Robert Cochran-Patrick	4,740	45.4	−5.5
Majority		960	9.2	N/A
Turnout		10,440	83.8	−4.5
Registered electors		12,465		
Liberal gain from Conservative		Swing	+5.5	

General election 1886: North Ayrshire
Party	Candidate	Votes	%	±%
Liberal Unionist	Hugh Elliot	Unopposed		
Liberal Unionist gain from Liberal				

=== Elections in the 1890s ===
Wedderburn

General election 1892: North Ayrshire
Party	Candidate	Votes	%	±%
Liberal Unionist	Thomas Cochrane	5,346	52.2	N/A
Liberal	William Wedderburn	4,898	47.8	New
Majority		448	4.4	N/A
Turnout		10,244	83.5	N/A
Registered electors		12,261		
Liberal Unionist hold		Swing	N/A	

General election 1895: North Ayrshire
Party	Candidate	Votes	%	±%
Liberal Unionist	Thomas Cochrane	5,612	53.4	+1.2
Liberal	William Robertson	4,902	46.6	−1.2
Majority		710	6.8	+2.4
Turnout		10,514	81.9	−1.6
Registered electors		12,837		
Liberal Unionist hold		Swing	1.2	

=== Elections in the 1900s ===
General election 1900: North Ayrshire
Party	Candidate	Votes	%	±%
Liberal Unionist	Thomas Cochrane	5,985	55.5	+2.1
Liberal	A. Williamson	4,791	44.5	−2.1
Majority		1,194	11.0	+4.2
Turnout		10,776	78.9	−3.0
Registered electors		13,657		
Liberal Unionist hold		Swing	+2.1	

General election 1906: North Ayrshire
Party	Candidate	Votes	%	±%
Liberal Unionist	Thomas Cochrane	5,603	43.6	−11.9
Liberal	Andrew Anderson	4,587	35.6	−8.9
Scottish Workers	James Brown	2,683	20.8	New
Majority		1,106	8.0	−3.0
Turnout		12,873	82.5	+3.6
Registered electors		15,597		
Liberal Unionist hold		Swing	−1.5	

=== Elections in the 1910s ===
General election January 1910: Ayrshire North
Party	Candidate	Votes	%	±%
Liberal	Andrew Anderson	6,189	44.4	+8.8
Liberal Unionist	Thomas Cochrane	5,951	42.7	−0.9
Labour	James Brown	1,801	12.9	−7.9
Majority		238	1.7	N/A
Turnout		13,941	84.7	+2.2
Registered electors		16,453		
Liberal gain from Liberal Unionist		Swing	+3.5	

General election December 1910: Ayrshire North
Party	Candidate	Votes	%	±%
Liberal	Andrew Anderson	7,286	51.2	+6.8
Unionist	Duncan Campbell	6,932	48.8	+6.1
Majority		354	2.4	+0.7
Turnout		14,218	85.3	+0.6
Registered electors		16,665		
Liberal hold		Swing	+0.4	

1911 North Ayrshire by-election
Party	Candidate	Votes	%	±%
Unionist	Duncan Campbell	7,318	50.9	+2.1
Liberal	Andrew Anderson	7,047	49.1	−2.1
Majority		271	1.8	N/A
Turnout		14,365	84.9	−0.4
Registered electors		16,926		
Unionist gain from Liberal		Swing	+2.1	

General Election 1914–15:

Another General Election was required to take place before the end of 1915. The political parties had been making preparations for an election to take place and by July 1914, the following candidates had been selected;

- Unionist: Duncan Campbell
- Liberal: Andrew Anderson

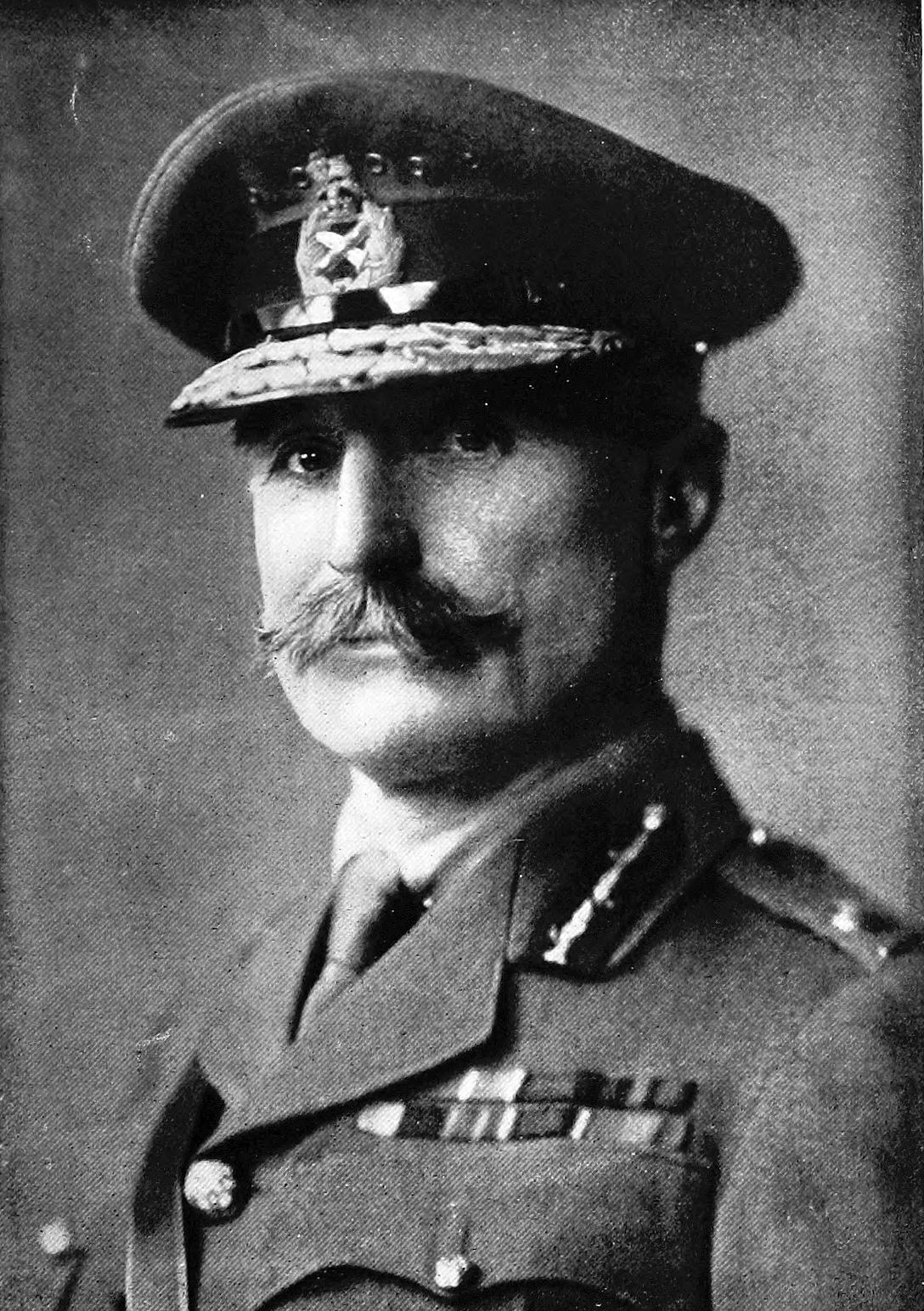
Hunter-Weston

1916 North Ayrshire by-election
Party	Candidate	Votes	%	±%
Unionist	Aylmer Hunter-Weston	7,149	84.6	+35.7
Peace by Negotiation	Humphrey Chalmers*	1,300	15.4	New
Majority		5,849	69.2	N/A
Turnout		8,449	48.6	−36.7
Registered electors		17,385		
Unionist gain from Liberal		Swing		

*Chalmers was supported by the Union of Democratic Control and contested the 1918 general election as a Labour Party candidate.

== See also ==
- Former United Kingdom Parliament constituencies
