= Patrick Boyle Mure Macredie =

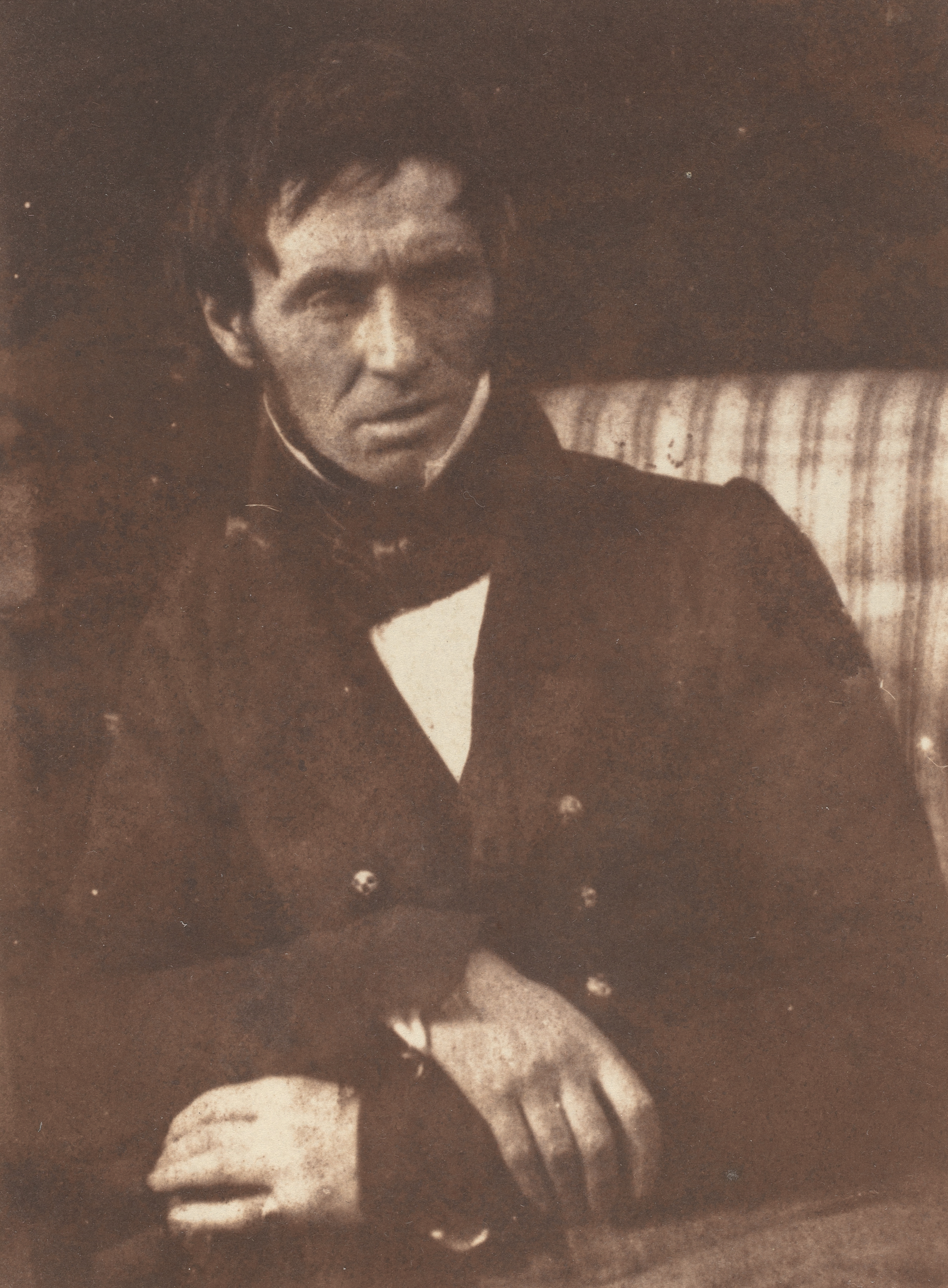
- Patrick Boyle Mure Macredie by Hill & Adamson

Personal details
- Born: 28 September 1800
- Died: 15 April 1868 (aged 67)

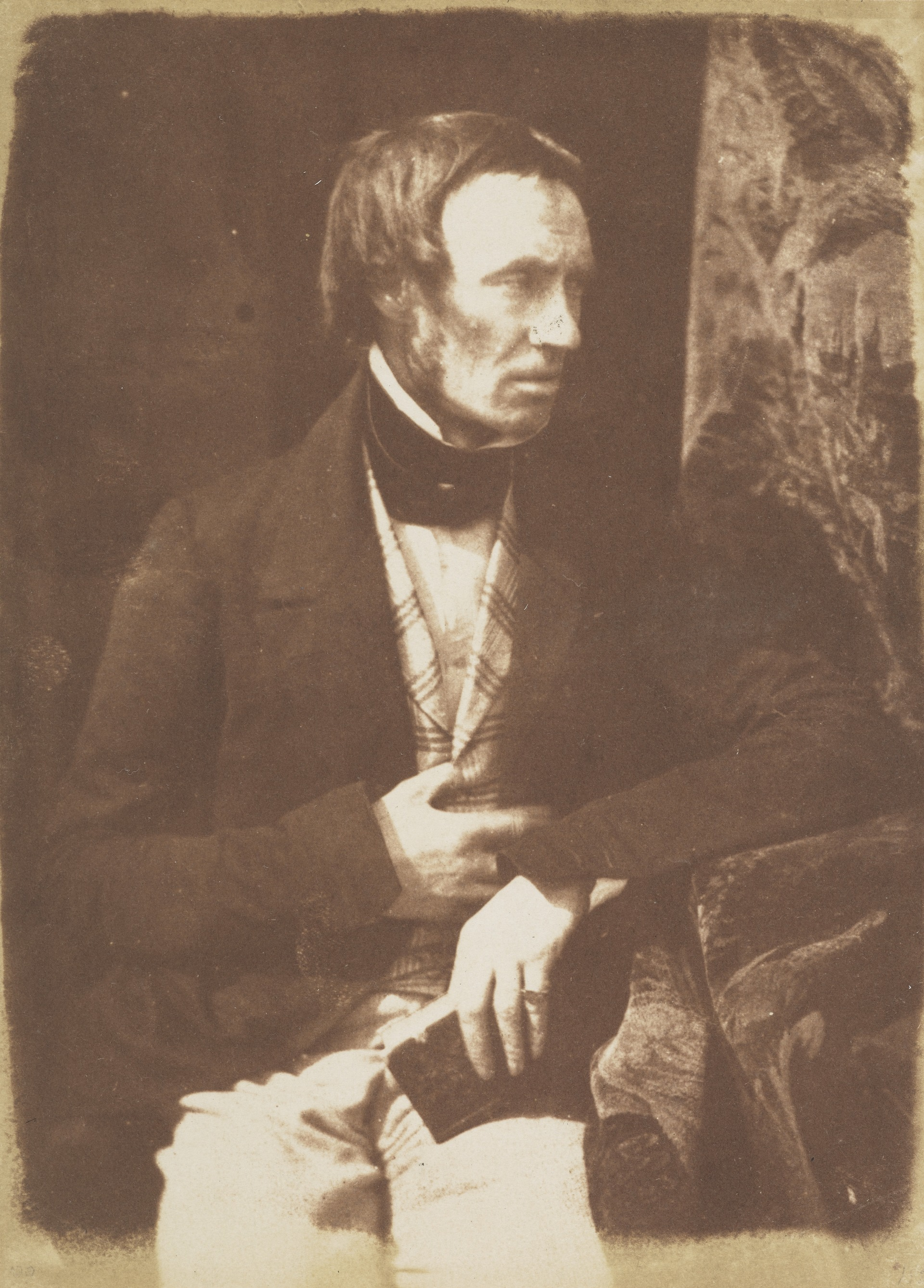
Patrick Boyle Mure Macredie with book by Hill & Adamson

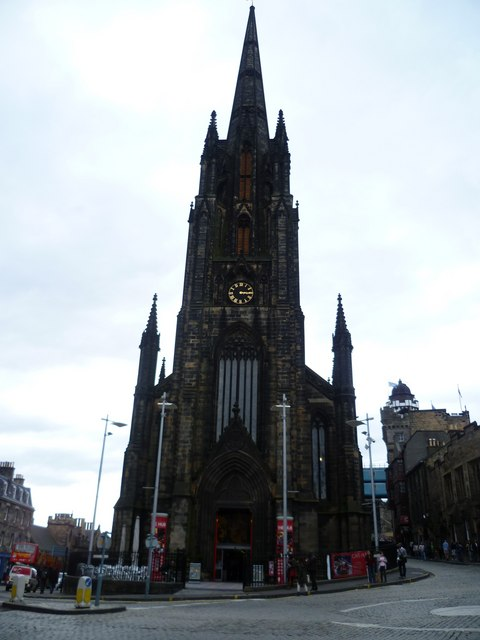
Old Tolbooth Kirk, Royal Mile where Mure was and elder.

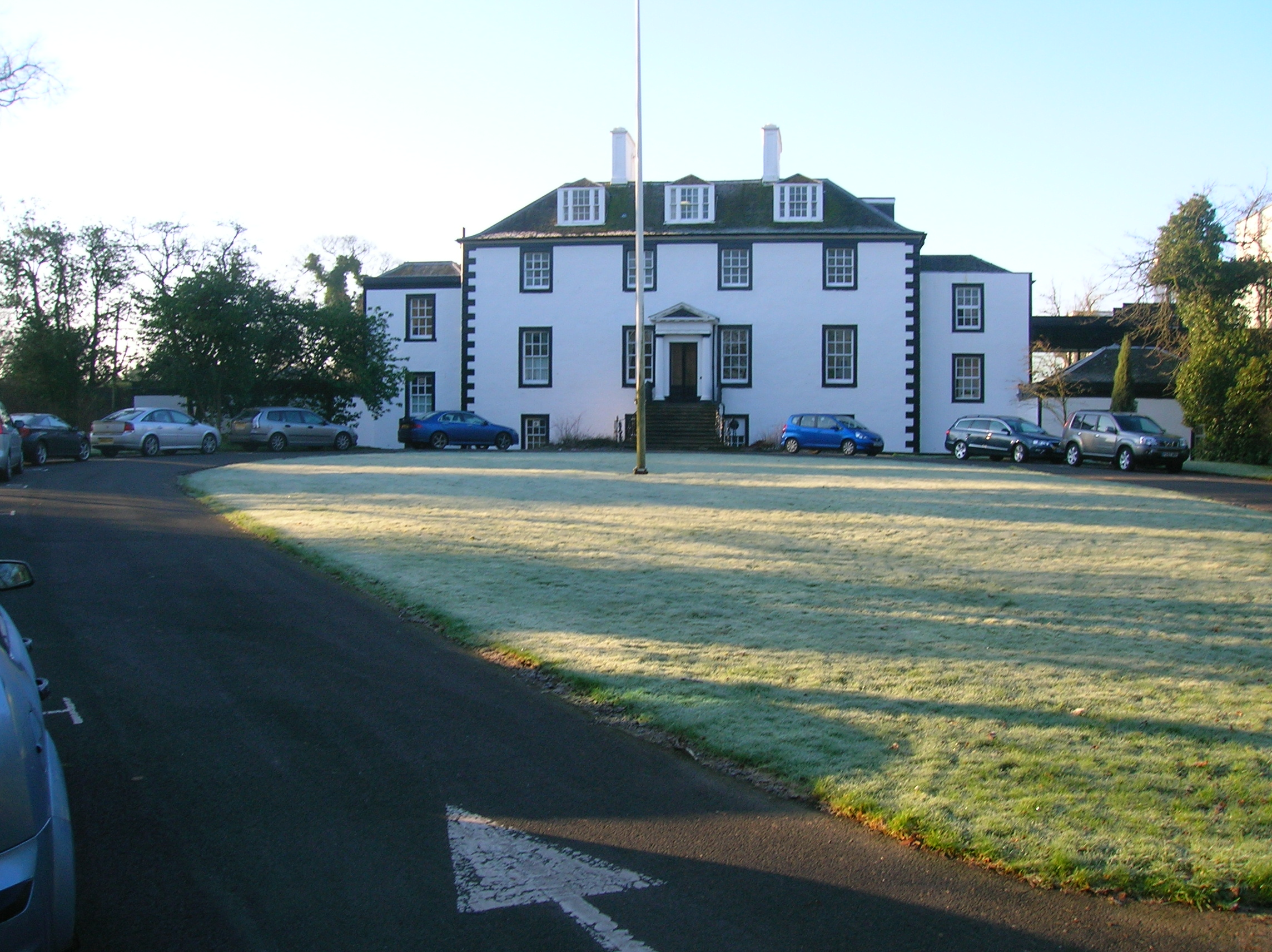
Perceton House approach

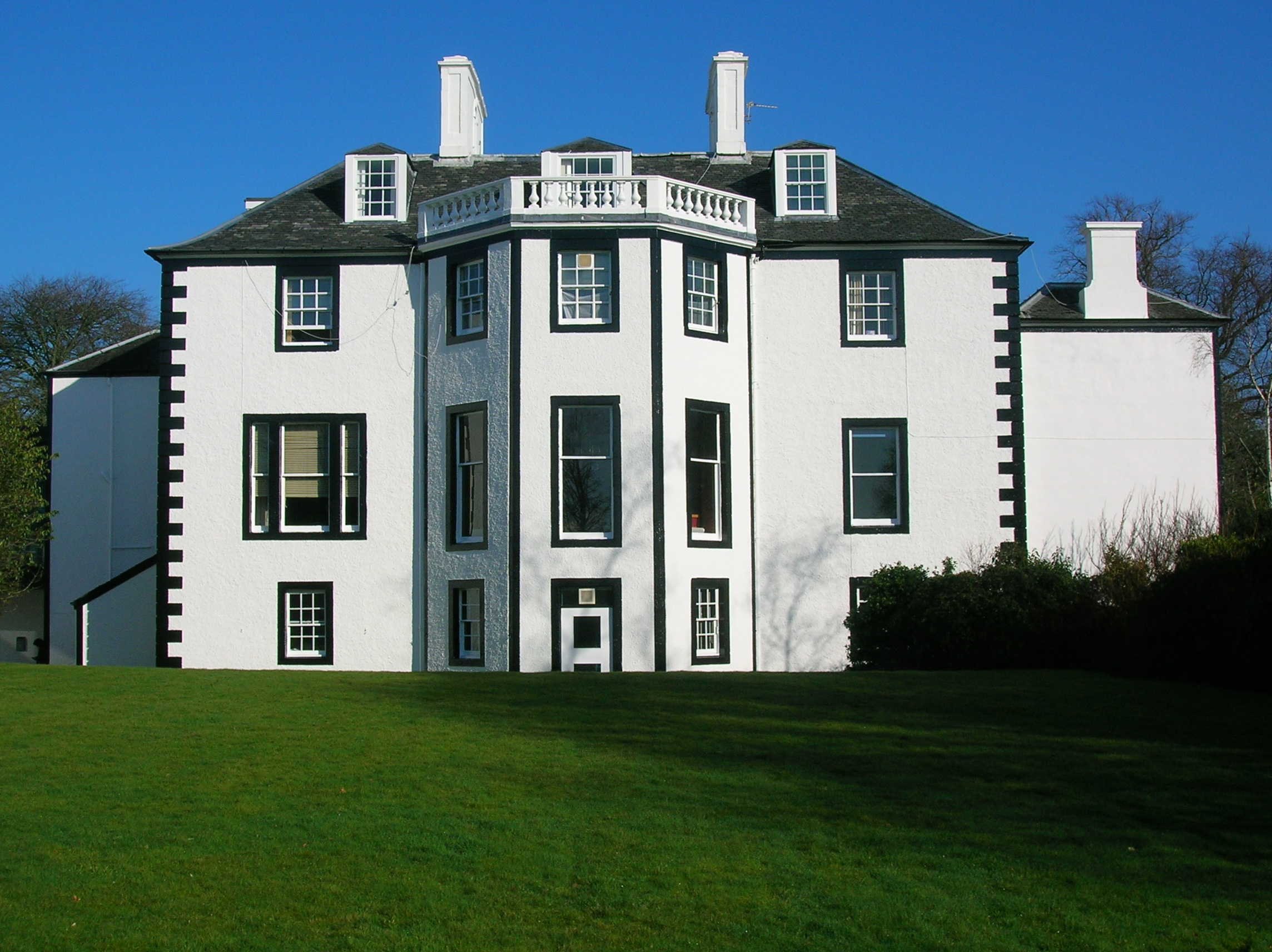
Perceton House 'back' view

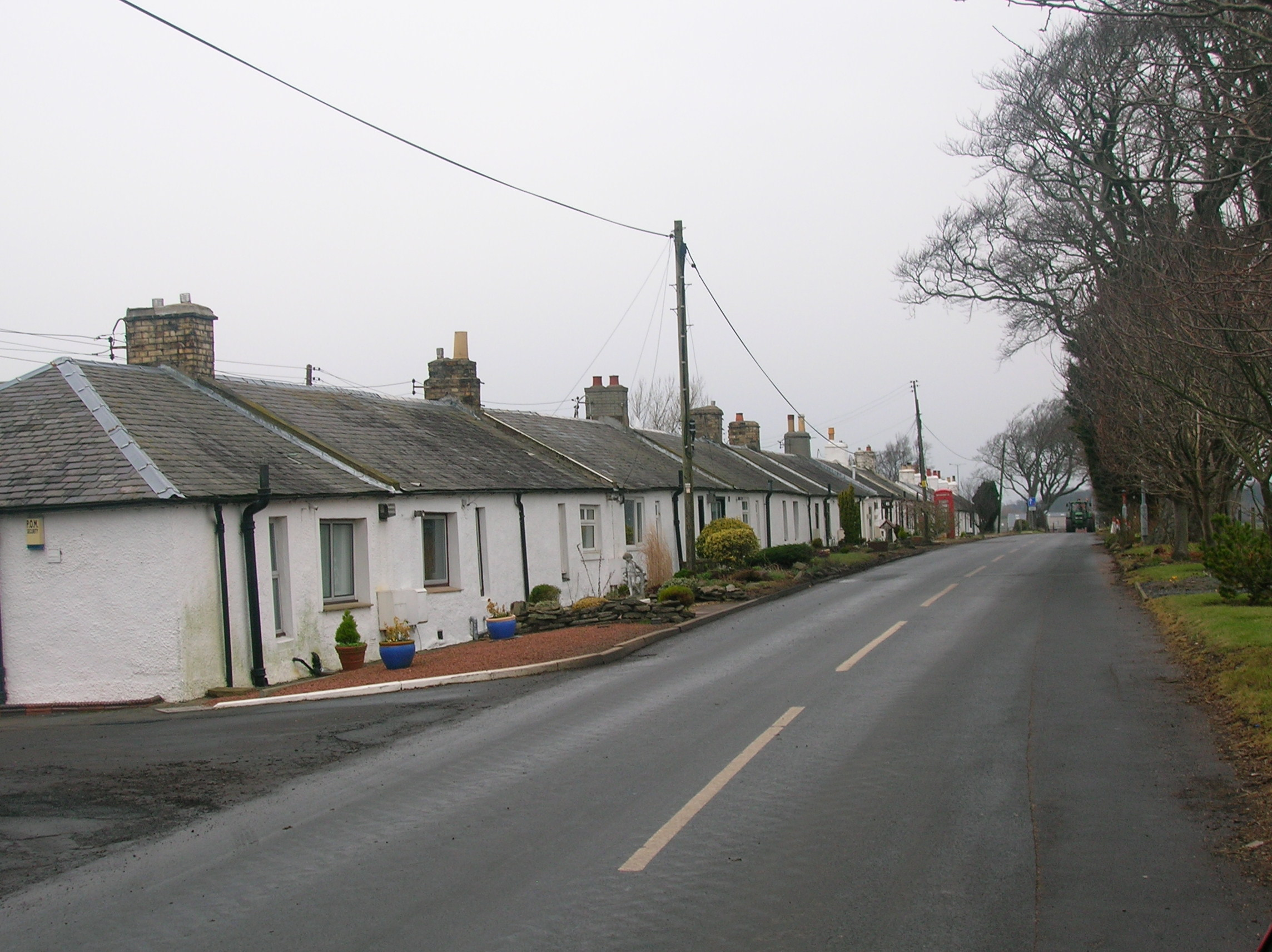
Percetonrow

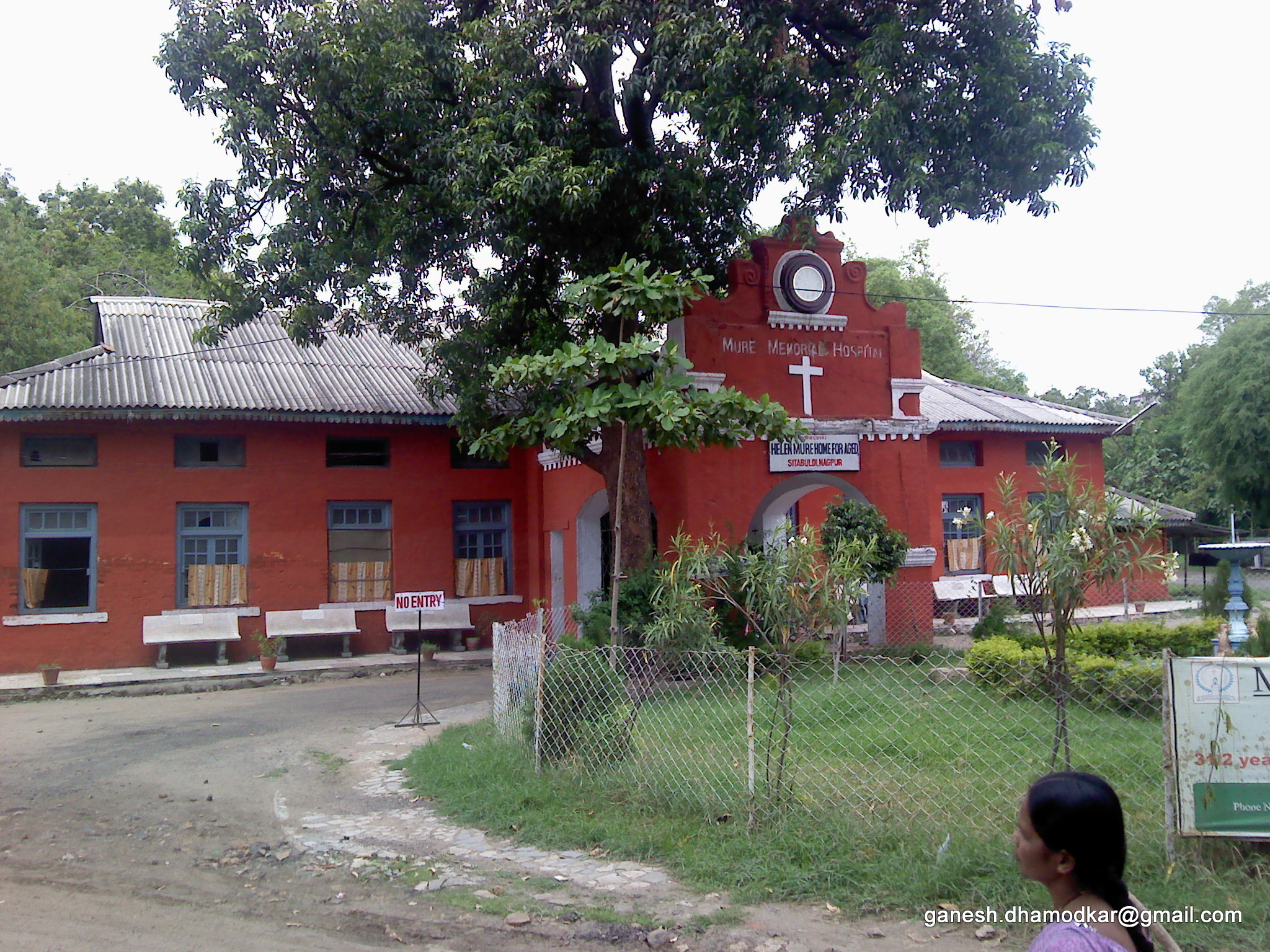
Mure Memorial Hospital. Muir's daughters funding the building of this hospital in memory of their father.

Patrick Boyle Mure Macredie (21 September 1800 – 15 April 1868) was the younger son of Thomas Mure, of Warriston House, Edinburgh (who died in 1806), by Helen, eldest daughter of the Hon. Patrick Boyle, of Shewalton. He was born in 1800, and having studied arts and law at the Universities of Edinburgh and Heidelberg, was called to the Scottish bar in 1822, his uncle, David Boyle then sitting on the Scottish Bench. He took an active part in county affairs, a leading one especially as chairman of the finance committee. He was an earnest promoter of the various enterprises for the spread of religion and education in the county, and more especially in his own neighbourhood. He also fostered a taste for the natural sciences, and was a member of the Royal Society of Edinburgh and several other kindred bodies. He married, in 1835, Rachael Anne, only child of the late John Macredie, of Perceton, whose name he assumed in addition to his own. The Mure Memorial Hospital, Nagpur is named after him.

== Early life and education ==
Patrick Mure was born at Warriston, Edinburgh, on 21 September 1800. His father was Thomas Mure, Esq. of Warriston. His mother was the eldest daughter of the Honourable Patrick Boyle of Shewalton, Ayrshire, and brother of the late George Mure, esq., of Herringswell Hall, Suffolk. He lost both his parents in very early life; but he came under the care of his maternal grandmother and uncle at Shewalton, as well as of his mother's sister, Mrs Smollet of Bonhill, at Cameron House. He was one of a large family. George, his elder brother, was in the Grenadier Guards, and carried the colours at Waterloo. Thomas, his younger brother, entered the navy, and died of fever in Irrawady.

Patrick, destined for the Bar, entered the University of Edinburgh in 1812, and passed with credit and approbation through the usual curriculum of the Arts Classes, as well as those of the Law. In 1822 he was one of nineteen who passed Advocate—seven of them on the same day, among whom were Sir Charles Fergusson of Kilkerran, Mr Hog of Newliston, and Lord Neaves.

== Christian conversion and influences ==
Towards the close of 1822 he begins to take note in his diary of the sermons he heard. The preaching of Andrew Mitchell Thomson produced a powerful impression on his mind; but it was chiefly through the ministry of Henry Grey that he underwent a Christian conversion. From this time forward he became a daily and systematic student of the Bible, availing himself of all the helps he could obtain. He soon afterwards became a Sabbath-school teacher, and his diaries reveal how deep was the interest he took in his class, and how diligently he prepared himself for it. When Thomas Chalmers was appointed to the Divinity Chair, like many others who were non-theological, he attended his lectures, and caught the enthusiasm for theological inquiry. Church history became a favourite study; and he set himself to acquire a knowledge of Hebrew, that he might be able to read the Old Testament Scriptures in the original tongue.

== Dreghorn in the Ten Years' conflict ==
For ten years of his Edinburgh life, he and his life-long friend, Alexander Dunlop, occupied the same apartments, and there can be no doubt that his intimacy with one so versed in ecclesiastical law could not fail to awaken his interest in ecclesiastical affairs, and this must have been deepened by the part he took in connection with the two settlements at Dreghorn. Twice over within the space of two short years that unfortunate parish was subjected to protracted litigation before the ecclesiastical courts, and in both Mr Mure was employed as counsel on behalf of the heritors and people. In the spring of 1830 a licentiate was presented, who was suspected of holding unsound views in regard to the sinless humanity of Christ. A libel was prepared, and evidence led. The General Assembly of 1831 found the libel proven, and the presentation was set aside. An acceptable appointment followed; but as the health of their new minister was extremely delicate, the people of Dreghorn trembled lest he should pass away before some other vacancy had occurred in the patron's gift, for it was known what name stood next on the patron's list. Their fears were realised—in the spring of 1834 their pastor died, the obnoxious presentation was issued, and the parish was plunged anew into conflict. This was the memorable year of the Veto Act, and the peculiarity in the case of Dreghorn was that the Act was passed betwixt the time of the issuing of the presentation and the moderation of the call. On all hands it was admitted that the special provisions of that Act could not apply; but forasmuch as that Act declared “that it is a fundamental law of this church that no minister should be intruded on a congregation against the will of the people,” the parishioners very naturally held that respect should be had to this fundamental principle in the settlement of the minister of Dreghorn. On the day of the moderation, the call was signed by very few, while the great majority objected to his settlement. The Presbytery decided in favour of the people, and the case was brought up by appeal to the next General Assembly; after a keen discussion, by a majority of one, the presentee was rejected. The people went home rejoicing in the victory they had won, but it was short-lived. It turned out that, in answer to the name of a gentleman who was not present, someone had voted in their favour. How it occurred, and by whom it was done, was never discovered. It was believed to have been accidental. It was most unfortunate for the people; but for this, the votes being equal, they would have obtained the benefit of the casting vote of the Moderator, but from this, in the peculiar circumstances, they were precluded, and it was held that no decision had been given. This involved the delay of another year. The whole question was re-argued in the General Assembly of 1836, when it carried by a majority of thirty-one in favour of the presentee, who was intruded on the parish.

== Activities after marriage ==
Having married the heiress of Perceton in 1835, he assumed the name of Macredie, and gave himself heartily to the discharge of the duties that now devolved upon him. In all the affairs of the county he took an active interest. An adept in figures, he was made Chairman of Finance, and from the intelligence and impartiality he brought to bear upon every question, his opinion was felt to be of value. A Conservative in politics, he threw himself with characteristic energy into every electioneering contest, and in the winter of 1854-5 he nominated Sir James Ferguson for the county of Ayr, who carried the election. Nor were his scientific studies laid aside. He became a member of the Royal Society, and other kindred institutions. He joined the British Association at its commencement, and was seldom absent from any of its annual gatherings. But while he kept himself abreast of the progress of science, he took the deepest interest in all the religious questions of the day. Having been ordained an elder in 1832, he sat in the General Assembly during nearly the whole of the ten years preceding the Disruption, and, as might have been expected, alike from his religious convictions and his Dreghorn experience, he was always found on the side of those who later formed the Free Church. When, in his own immediate neighbourhood, the Stewarton case arose, involving the right of the quoad sacra ministers to a seat in the church courts, he stood forward in the defence, and rendered service to the Presbytery in the conduct of the case. True to his convictions, he left St Andrew's Church on the memorable Disruption day.

== Fire-clay works ==
In addition to his other duties, Mr Macredie devoted a large share of time and attention to the mines and the fire-clay works which he carried on. This involved him in much hard work, but success attended his efforts.

The welfare of those immediately under his charge lay very near his heart. At a time when the question of improved accommodation for workers had not come to the front, he built fifteen miners’ cottages, of three apartments each, for which he received a medal from the Highland Society. He taught a class of grown-up lads on the Sabbath evenings, and besides employing a missionary to labour among them, he held prayer-meetings in the cottages. When the revival of 1859-60 visited the West of Scotland, he threw himself into it with the greatest zeal, aided in building a mission hall, and, at his own expense, provided additional labourers to cultivate the field—a work which his family still continue. But his interest was not confined to his own locality. From his frequent intercourse with the South, he found that the Westminster Catechism was scarcely known to the clergy of the Church of England. He printed a special edition of the Catechism, and sent a copy to every Episcopal clergyman.

== Death and legacy ==
In the summer of 1863 he was visited with a very serious illness, from the effects of which he never fully recovered. The few remaining years of his life passed quietly away. He was suffering from disease of the heart. Though it weakened, it did not confine him. On the morning of 15 April 1868 he died, leaving behind him a widow, two sons and two daughters.

The remains of the deceased were interred in the churchyard of Perceton. The Mure Memorial Hospital, Nagpur is named after him.

== Family ==
He married, in 1835, Rachel Ann, only daughter of John Macredie, fourth of Perceton, an officer in the Royal Navy and had issue-

- Mary Rachel
- Thomas Mure Mure, Advocate, whose untimely death in 1876 at the Abbots Ripton rail accident. On the evening of the 21 January 1876, Thomas Mure, the eldest of the two sons was partially injured in the first collision, he was crushed beneath the engine in the second. There for three hours he lay amid the drifting snow. For two days he lingered. On 23 January he died, in the presence of his mother and sisters, who had hastened to be with him. Mr Thomas M. Mure was unmarried.
- John Macredie Mure, a captain in the 34th Regiment, whose inventions in scientific musketry, and skill in applying them, gained him the appointment of Deputy- Assistant Adjutant General for that branch of the service; he died in India in 1879 aged 37. Captain Mure left no children.
- Helen Jane
- Sophia Robina
