= Perceton =

Medieval settlement and old country estate in North Ayrshire, Scotland

Coordinates: 55°37′50.7″N 4°36′56.5″W

Perceton is a medieval settlement and old country estate in North Ayrshire, Scotland, near the town of Irvine. The ruined church in Perceton is one of the oldest buildings in the Irvine district. The earliest legible gravestone dates from 1698, though older stone coffins will certainly still rest deep within the small hillock on which the chapel and graveyard sit.

== History and Archaeology ==
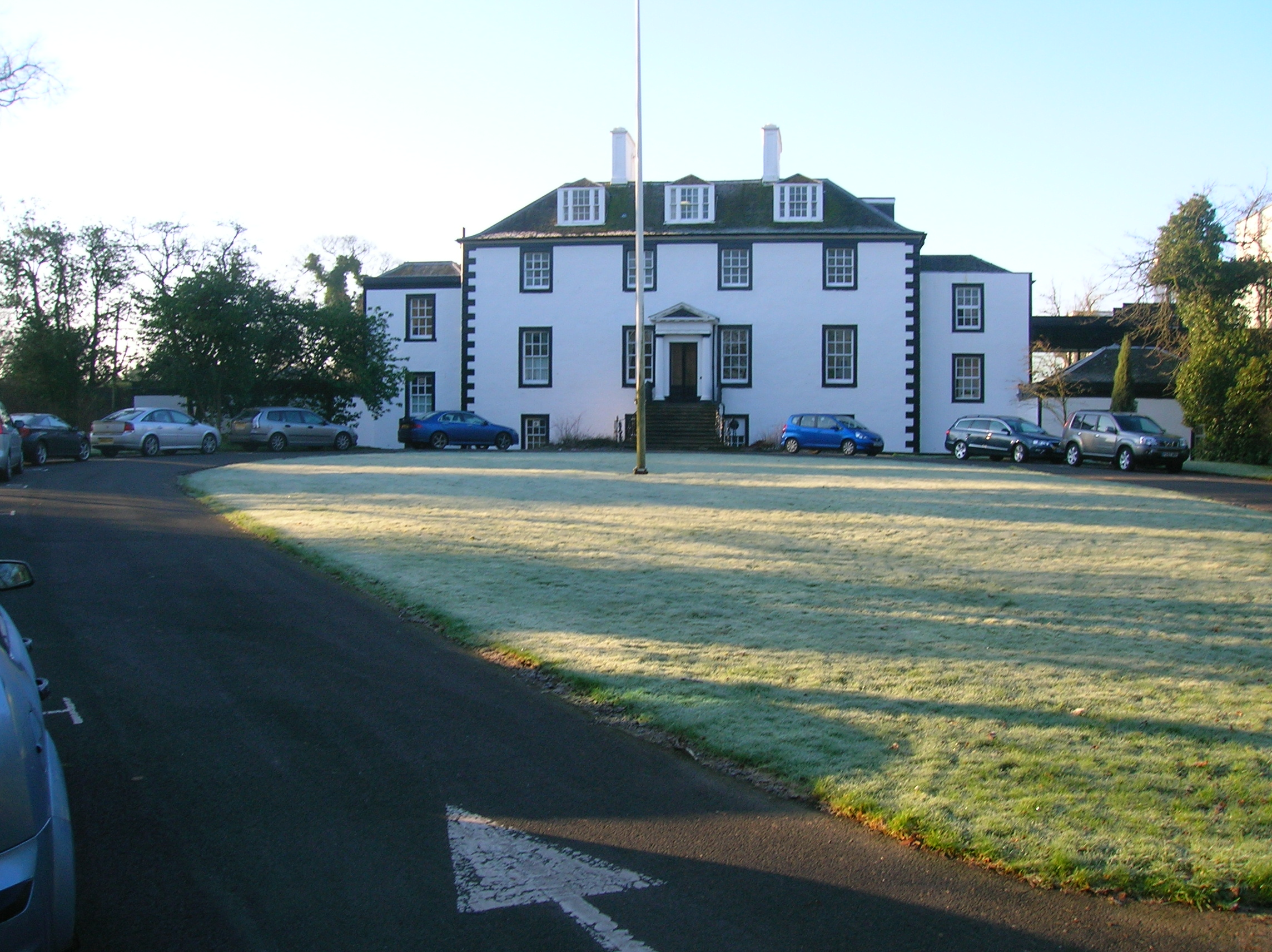
Perceton House

Perceton House has been demolished and rebuilt several times over the centuries. The present house dates from the late 18th century. Archaeological excavations have uncovered evidence of the long lost medieval manor house which was protected by a moat and the Annick Water. The site is now covered by the modern housing estate known as The Grange. The Cunninghamhead and Annick Lodge Estates are nearby.

An excavation undertaken by Headland Archaeology encountered the foundation trench for a defensive wooden palisade enclosing postholes of a substantial timber building. Access to the compound was through an elaborate entrance, possibly with two gateways, shown below.

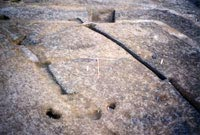
Entrance through the palisade

.

Historical research and post-excavation work has led to this being interpreted as a 12th-century stockaded farmstead without obvious excavated parallels. At that time it is likely that the Perceton lands were run by a steward, resident in the farmstead in the name of an absentee landowner. This type of site may be common but rarely visible, except as a cropmark, which without excavation may be mistakenly classified as prehistoric.

In the early 14th century the land became the principal residence of a member of the Stewart family. The old stockade was removed and a moat excavated, probably around a new manor house. In the late 15th century following a period of absorption in larger estates the site again became a principal residence, to one Ninian Barclay. This resulted in the building of a new mansion, mainly lying to the south of the excavation. This was demolished in the 1720s, when another new owner constructed the present Perceton House.

An old curling pond is situated nearby, now managed as a Scottish Wildlife Trust nature reserve.

== The Lands of Perceton ==
=== Families ===
Sir Hugh de Eglintoun held a charter for Pocertoon in 1361 from John de Moravia and in the early 14th century the land became the principal residence of a member of the Stewart family. The old stockade was removed and a moat excavated, probably around a new manor house. In the late 15th century, following a period of absorption into larger estates, the site again became a principal residence to one Ninian Barclay. This resulted in the building of a new mansion, which was in turn demolished in 1770, when another new owner constructed Perceton House.

The mansion house still stands, a little to the south of the former site, with a modern office block added for the use of the Irvine Development Corporation (IDC) which was wound up some years ago. The office block was designed so that the whole building could be converted easily into a hotel, however in the event North Ayrshire Council (NAC) took over the buildings from IDC. In 2014 NAC put the house and lands up for sale.

A daughter of Sir William Douglas, Dominus de Pierston in her own right, married Robert Barclay about the year 1400 and the lands of Pierceton and Warrickhill were the inheritance, being 900 Scots acres of among the most fertile lands in Dreghorn Parish. Previously they were part of the possessions of John Balliol, King of Scots and his near relatives, De Ferreres and De la Suche (Zouche). The Barclay family sold the property in 1720 to the Macredies, however the Baronetcy continued in the time of Robertson (1823), the family then residing in Middlesex. Perceton was originally a Barony held under Hugh de Morville. In 1640 the Lands of Perstoune held by the Laird were valued at £700.

The Macredie.'s, spelt 'McReady' in 1776 were involved in British Army service and various business pursuits until John Macredie succeeded in 1816. He had a daughter, Rachel Anne, who married Patrick Boyle Mure, second son of Thomas Mure of Warriston, by Helen, daughter of the Hon. Patrick Boyle of Shewalton, third son of John, second Earl of Glasgow. In addition to the name Mure he assumed the name of Macredie. Mure Macredie died in 1868, leaving two sons and three daughters.

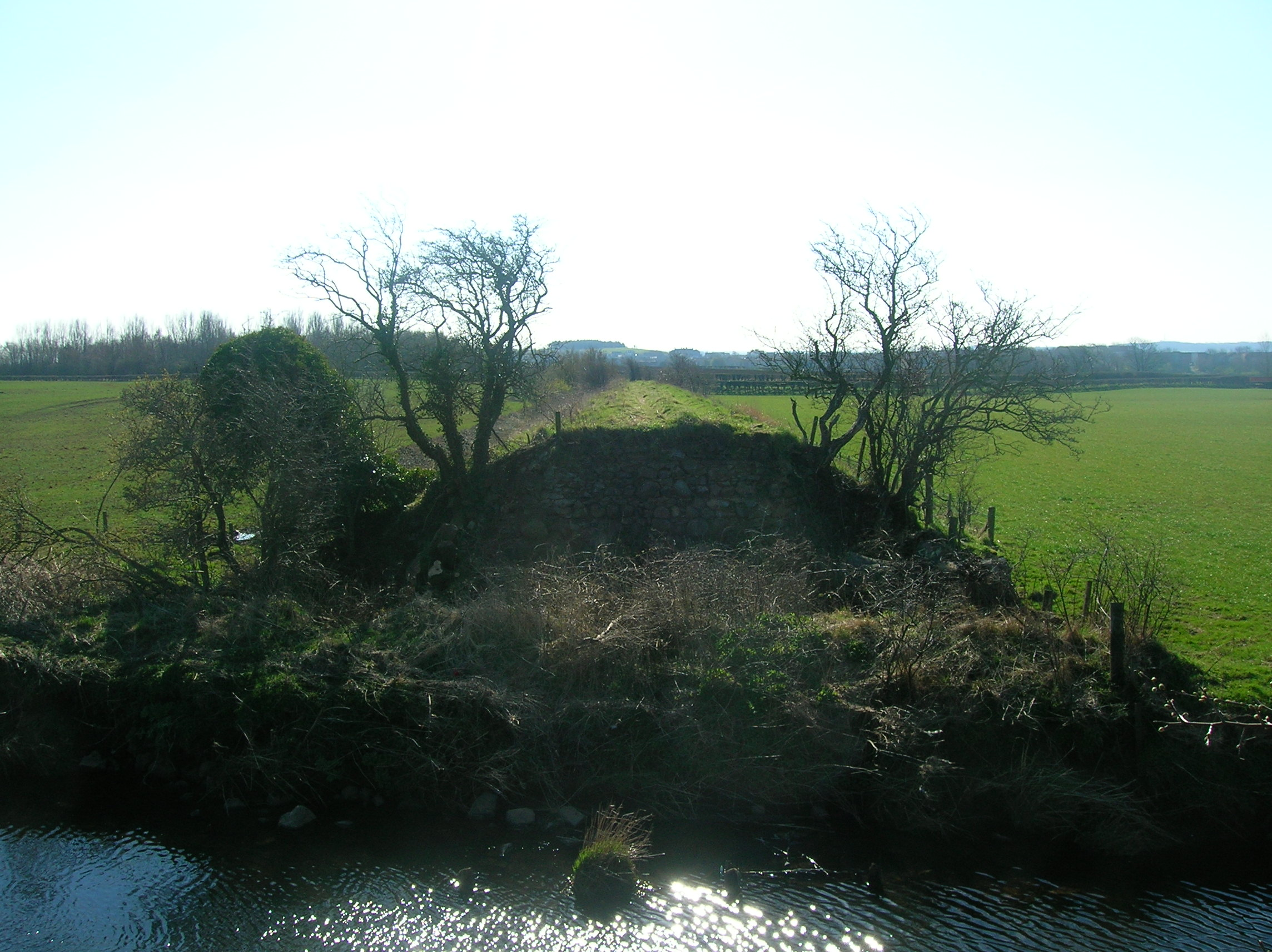
The old railway line to Perceton Colliery

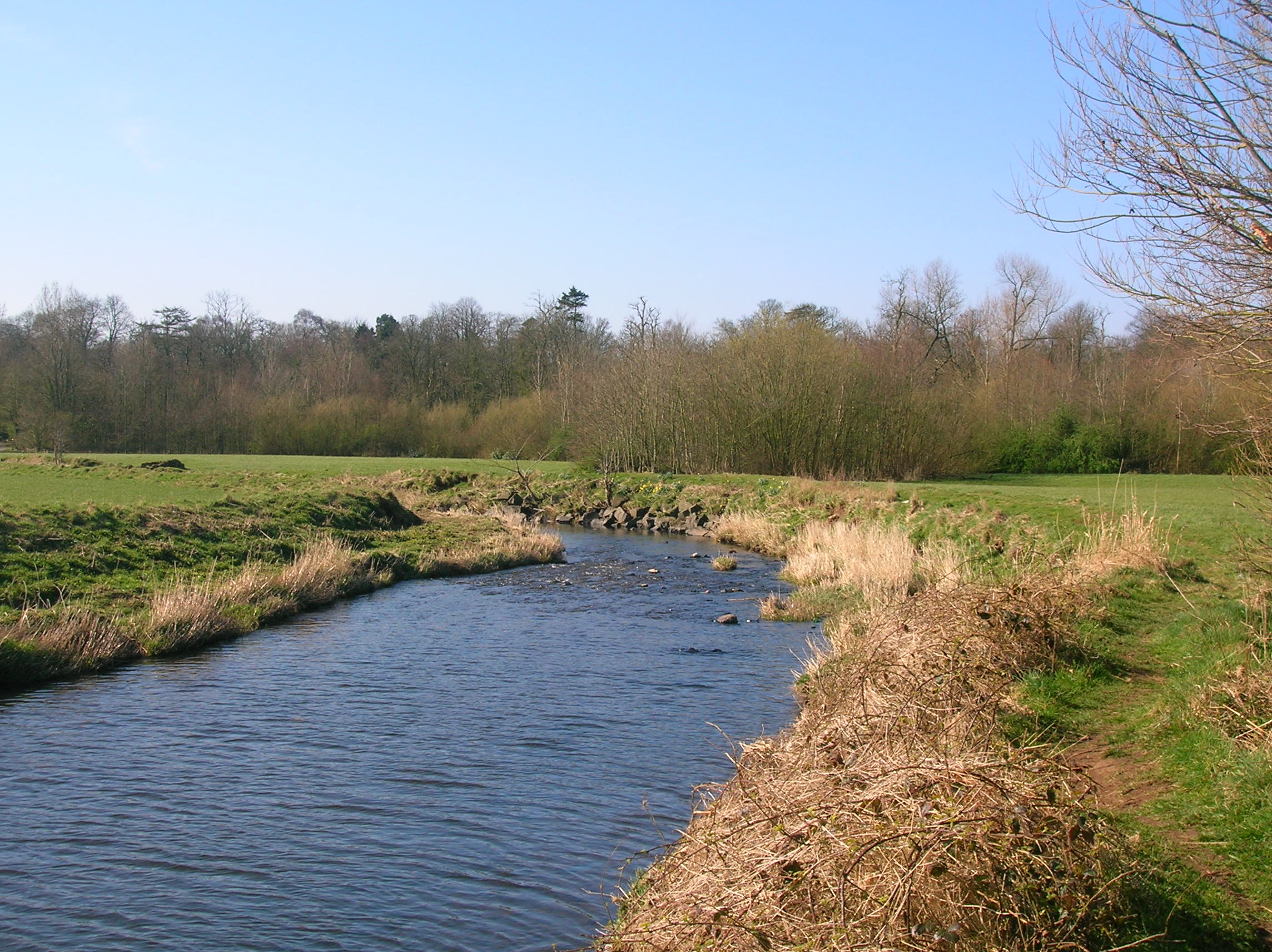
The Annick Water near Perceton

=== Conventicles ===
To prevent the Covenanters holding 'Conventicles', King Charles II moved highland troops, the 'Highland Host' into the westland of Ayrshire. "They took free quarters; they robbed people on the high road; they knocked down and wounded those who complained; they stole, and wantonly destroyed, cattle; they subjected people to the torture of fire to discover to them where their money was hidden; they threatened to burn down houses if their demands were not at once complied with; besides free quarters they demanded money every day; they compelled even poor families to buy brandy and tobacco for them; they cut and wounded people from sheer devilment." The cost of all this amounted to £6062 12s 8d in Stewarton parish alone.

=== Perceton mill ===
Perceton Mill is marked on the 1860 Ordnance Survey map and stood until the early 1990s, finishing its useful life as the local shop and Post Office. It was an early example of sustainability, generating its own electricity from the early 20th century using a generator linked to the gearing of the waterwheel (Roberts 2006). The line of the lade is still clear running below the site of the old road and coming out to rejoin the river downstream, near the car park of the Free Church building behind the old Perceton Church. Lawthornbank smithy stands on the opposite bank of the Annick Water.

=== Towerlands ===
Towerlands was a small country estate near Bourtreehill that was purchased by Patrick Boyle Mure Macreadie of Perceton purchased the property in 1844 and his son Thomas Mure Macreadie then inherited and held it in the 1860s.

=== Perceton old parish church ===
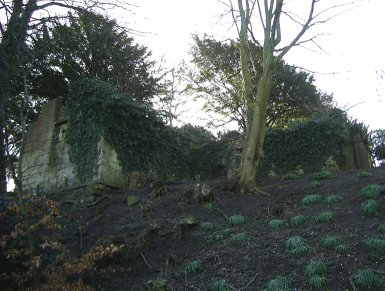
Old Perceton Church ruins on the mound.

The parishes of Dreghorn and Perceton (also spelt Percetoun (1775), Reiston (1776)), Perrostoun (1807), Percieton (1821), Pewston (Millar 1885), Pierceton, Pierston or Pierstoun were united in 1668 and the old pre-reformation church on the densely wooded mound at Perceton was abandoned. We know the names of a few of those associated with the old kirk; John Young being the minister in 1574 and David Whyte the reader. In 1565 George Brounside was vicar of Perceton and at this time he feued the lands of Perceton Kirk to the laird of Perceton, William Barclay, reserving ..an honest chamber and one acre to be inhabited by the minister or vicar of the parish church.

The ruins are still fairly substantial and clearly visible, with the church and churchyard containing many monuments to the historic families of Cunninghamhead and Pierceton. The Free Church became the Mission Hall for the parish church in Dreghorn and recently it has become an evangelical Christian centre (datum 2006). The entire church, churchyard and hall have all been fenced off and the gates padlocked (2006). The old village and Parish of Perceton had been almost as large as Dreghorn in earlier times, all the surrounding farms housing a significant population. A miners row called Perceton Row is still to be found near Dreghorn.

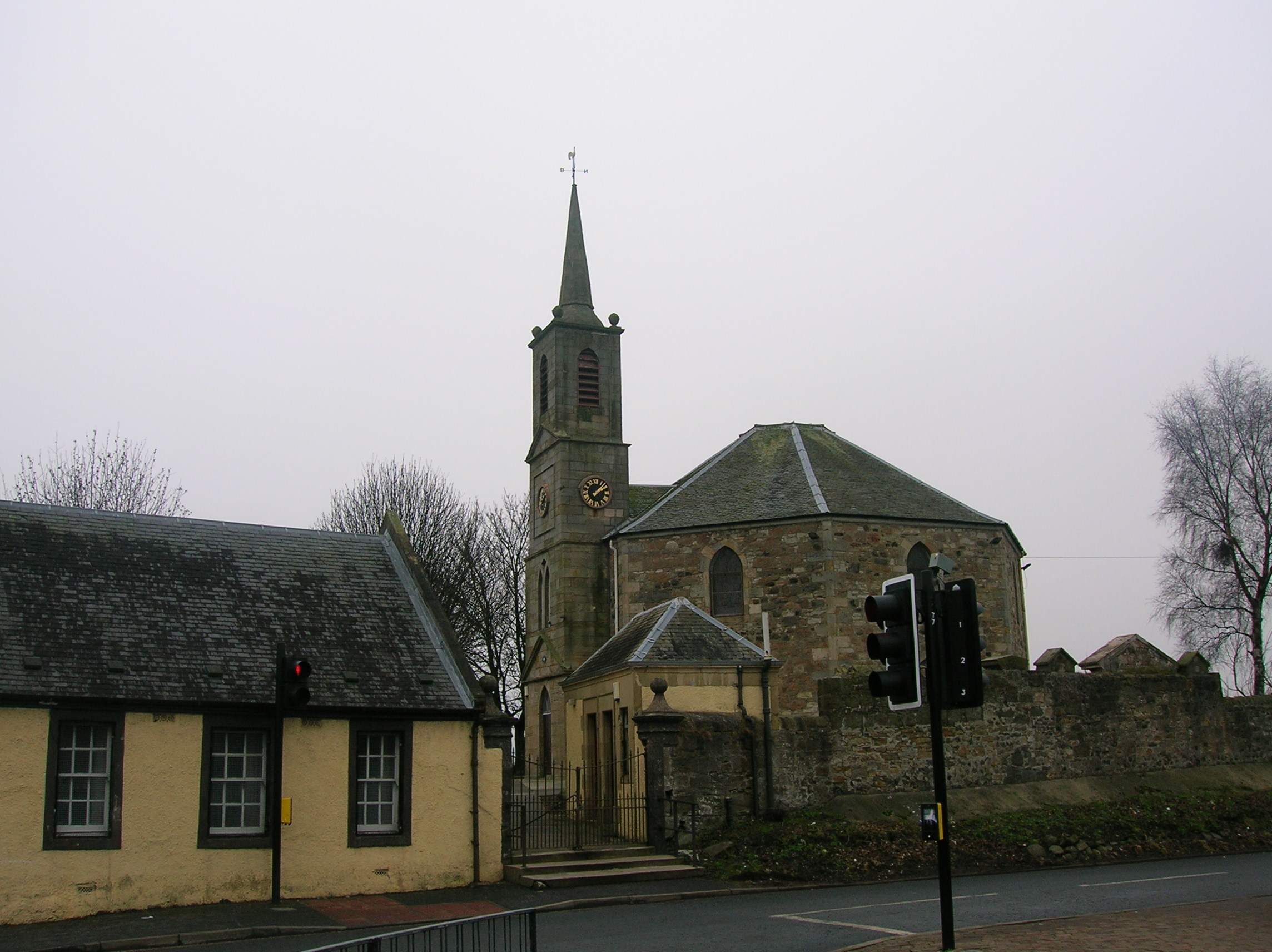
Dreghorn Parish kirk in 2007

A tombstone in Perceton wood records the tragedy of the drowning in the Annick Water, of a girl aged only two years and eight months on 12 July 1867. His mother was Agnes McAntosh.

The prominent mound is partly man made, but does not seem to have any recorded prehistory attached to it, despite its proximity to the Lawthorn Mount.

=== Maid Morville's mound ===
Maid Morville's Mound lay on the Dreghorn to Dundonald road, just before the Holmside Bridge over the Irvine, and was said to commemorate a lady of the house of De Morville who drowned at the ford across the Irvine. It is not obvious today and may have been destroyed by the earthworks associated with the new expressway as it was stated to be a natural mound. Locally it was known as the 'Marble Hill', a corruption of 'Morville's Hill'.

== Gallery ==
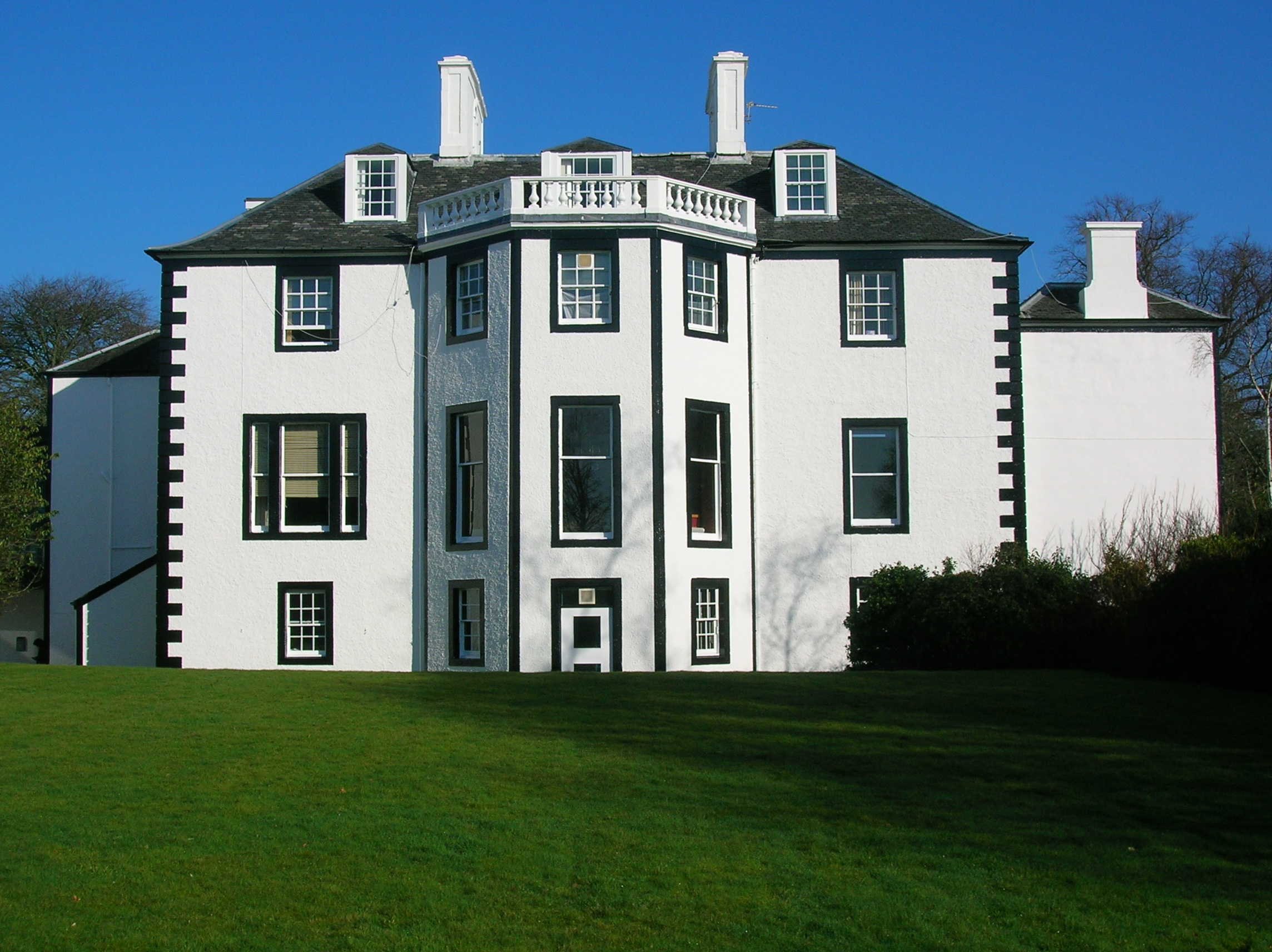
Perceton House facing towards the old church.

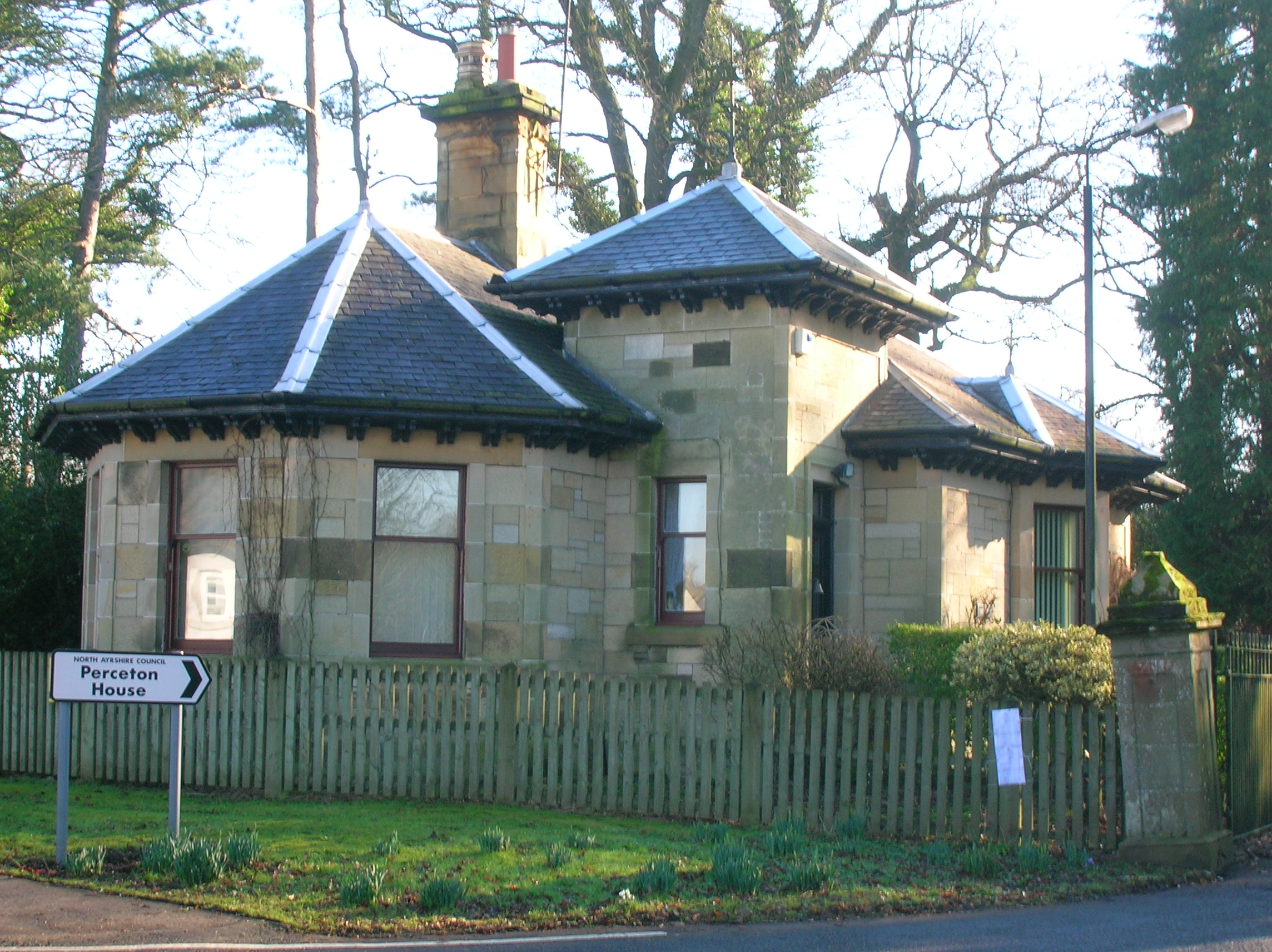
Perceton lodge.

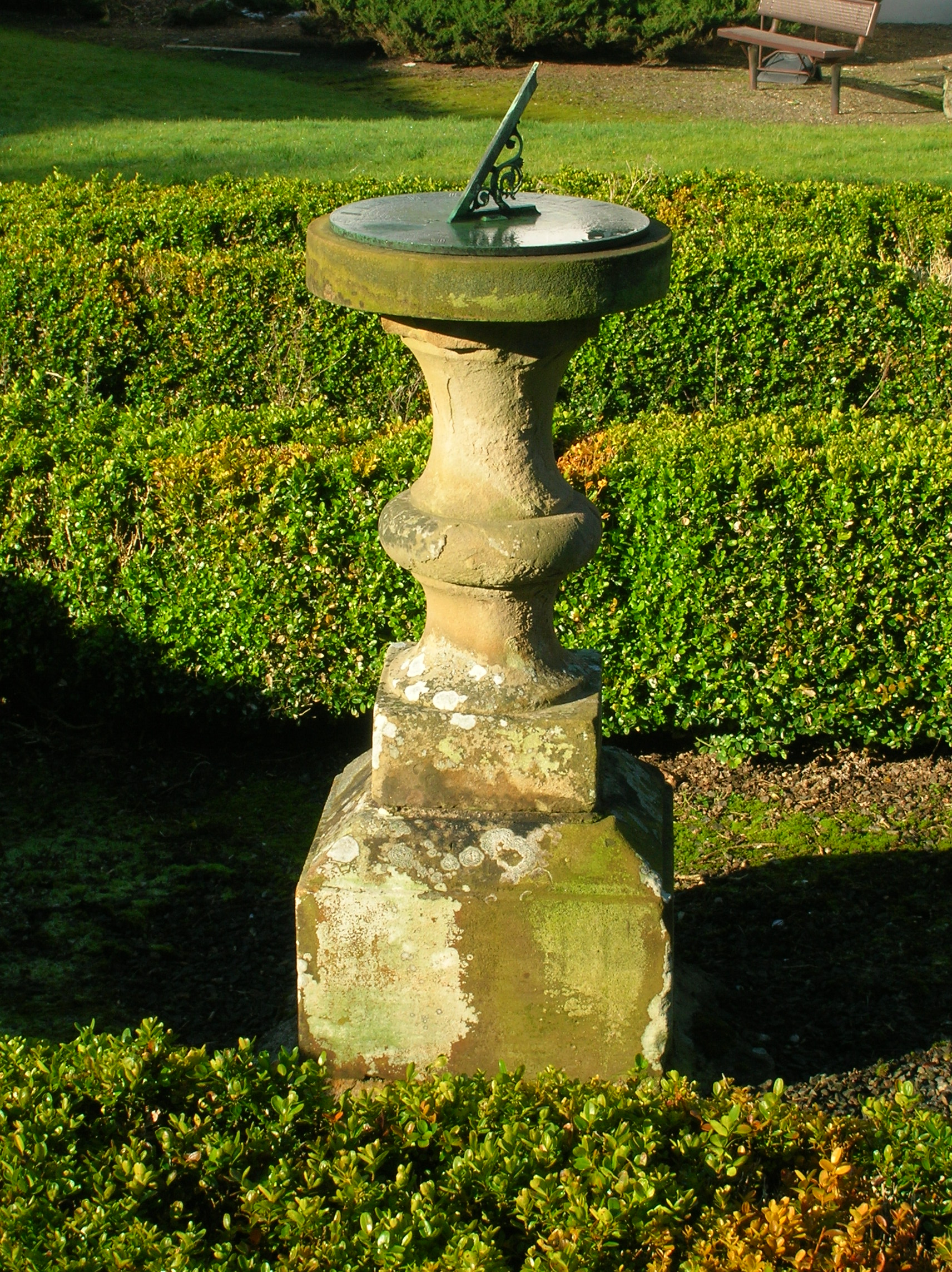
The old sundial in the Perceton gardens.

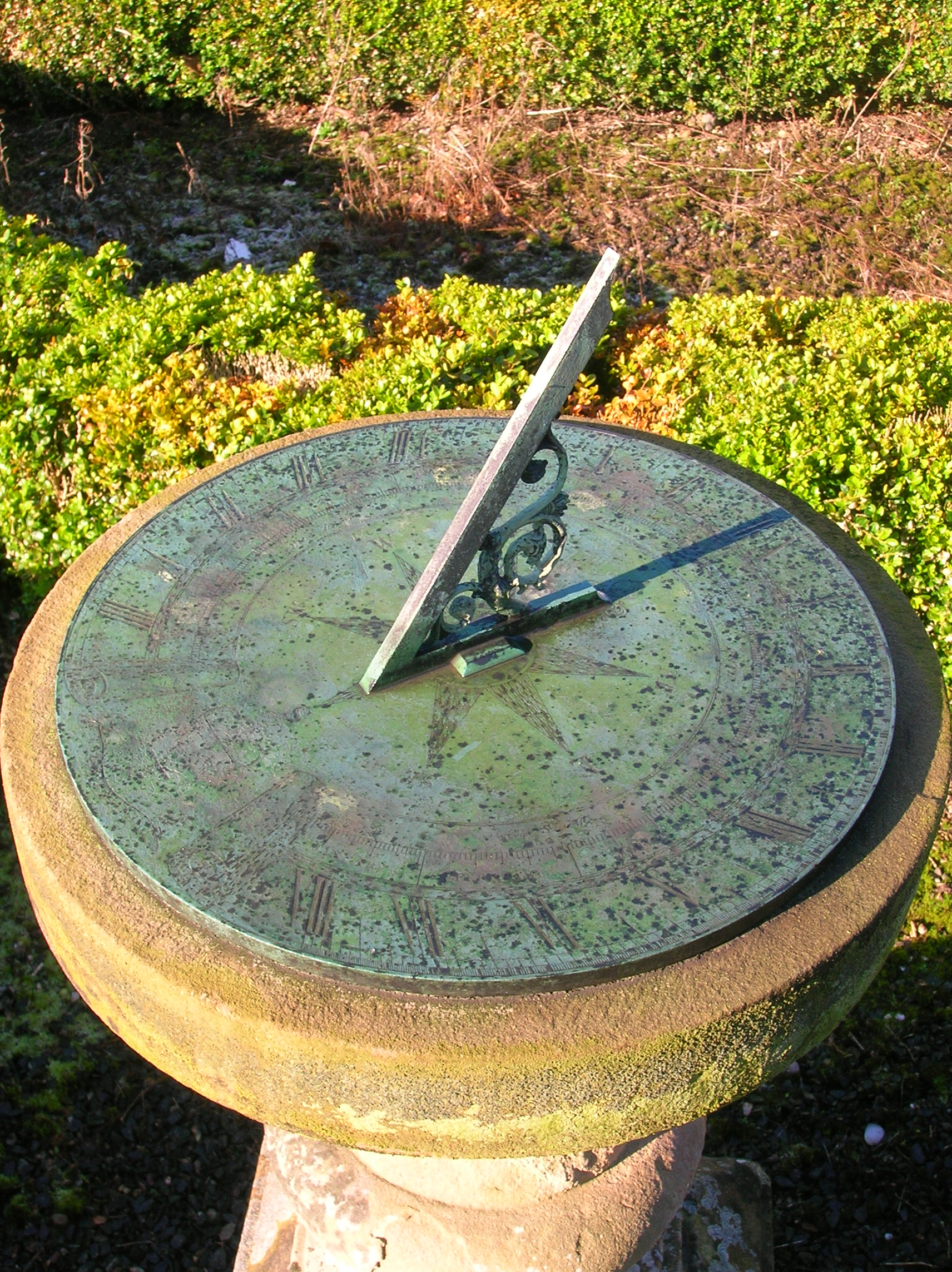
Detail of the dial. Unusually a coat of arms has been engraved onto the face.

=== Natural history ===
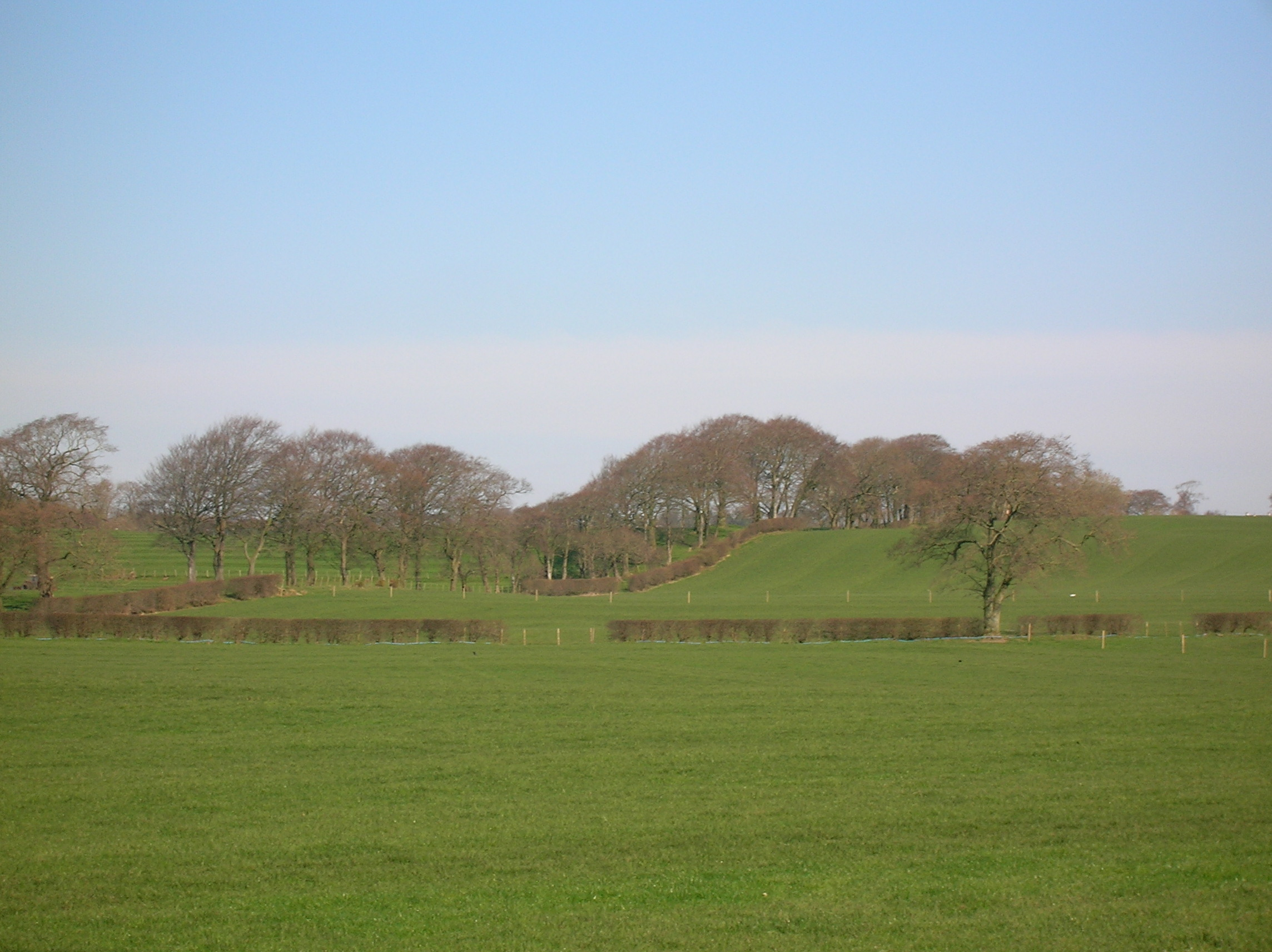
The old wooded lane from Muirhouses farm to Middleton Cottage with the 'Cheepy Neuk'. 2007.

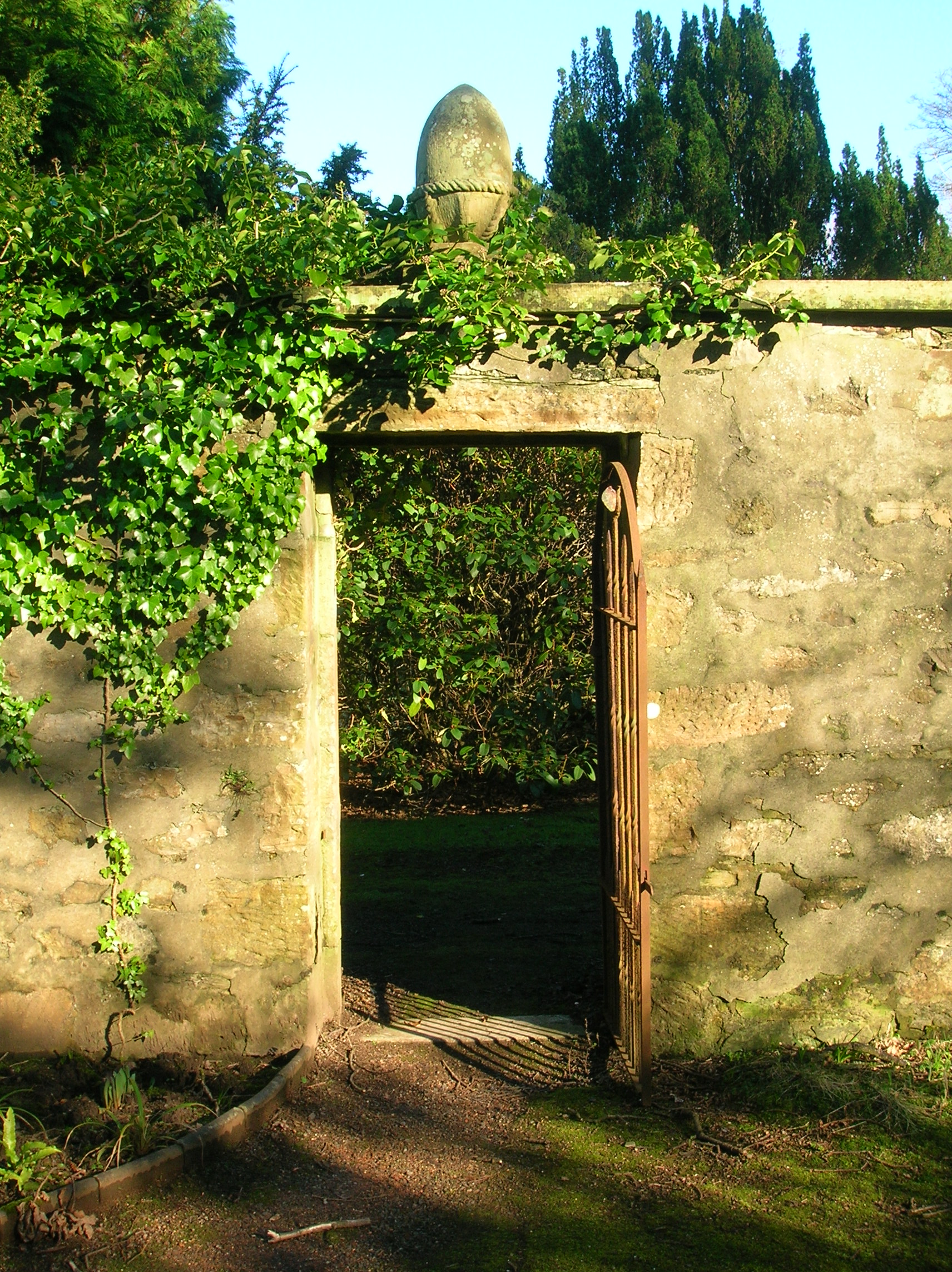
A stone pineapple in the gardens at Perceton House

The Scottish Wildlife Trust, based in Edinburgh, obtained a nature reserve here which was originally established by Irvine Development Corporation. It comprises a wooded area and open water, the latter being an old curling pond associated with Perceton House. The site is recognised for the bat species which roost and hibernate in the old estate's trees.

A section of the woodland strip that runs along the old road from Muirhouses farm (on the Perceton Roow road) to Middleton cottage on the main road, is marked at 'Cheepy Neuk' on the OS maps of 1966 and 2000. In Scots 'Cheepy' means 'Chirpy' as in bird song or it can mean 'a light kiss', prompting the thought that this may have been a trysting place for courting couples in times past.

The Yellow Archangel flower grows in the estate near to the old farm buildings. This species is possibly a native to Ayrshire, however it has a close distribution link to country estates and this makes its status as a native species rather uncertain. Other significant plants are the Twayblade orchid, helleborine orchid, sanicle, meadow saxifrage and the Welsh poppy.

=== Over and Nether Drummuir ===
The name may literally mean 'The large eminence or knowe'. These lands were held by the Barclays of Perceton until 1874, when they sold to the Macredies and then in 1830 they were purchased by the Morris family of Craig Estate.

=== Nether-Pierstoun ===
The Barclays held this estate for several centuries. King Robert the Bruce originally gave the lands of Pierstoun and Warrickhill to Sir James Stewart in around 1330. His son James inherited and his only offspring, a daughter, married Sir William Douglas (see Perceton) who took the title of Pierston and in turn his only offspring again were daughters, the eldest of whom married Robert Barclay in around 1444. Charles II made Robert Barclay a baronet by Letters Patent in 1668. The Barclays were much travelled and had strong social links with British and foreign royalty, also serving with distinction in the Royal Navy and the army. Nether-Pierstoun became simply Pierstoun / Perceton upon its sale to Andrew Macreadie, Provost of Stranraer in 1720.

=== Over-Pearston ===
The Blairs of Adamton, related to the Blairs of Blair, acquired this property through the marriage of John Blair with the eldest daughter of Sir William Douglas of Peirstoun. Pearston-hall (now Annick Lodge) stood on this estate. The property passed through the hands of the Earl of Eglinton and Winton, various other Montgomeries, James Somerville of Kennox, then further Montgomeries and others before becoming the property of Alexander Montgomerie of Coilsfield in the 19th. Century.

=== Perceton Row ===
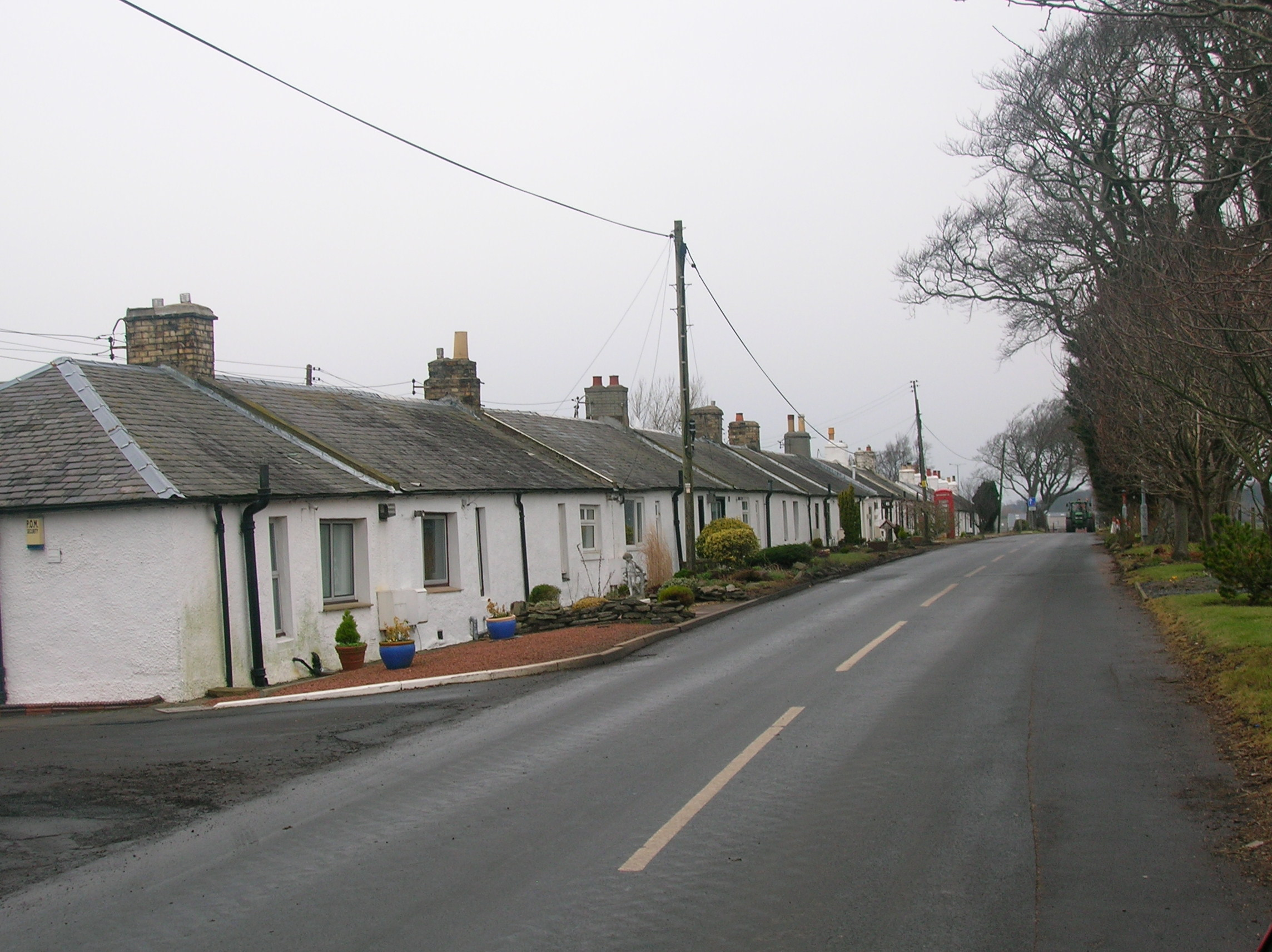
The old miners' and brickworkers' row at Perceton

A row of miners' and later brickworkers' cottages, a rare survival. The pictured cottages at Perceton Row are shown on the 1895 Ordnance Survey map, but not the 1828 Thompson map.

== See also ==
- Cunninghamhead, Perceton and Annick Lodge
- River Irvine
