= Roger Montgomerie =

British Conservative politician

Roger Montgomerie MP JP DL
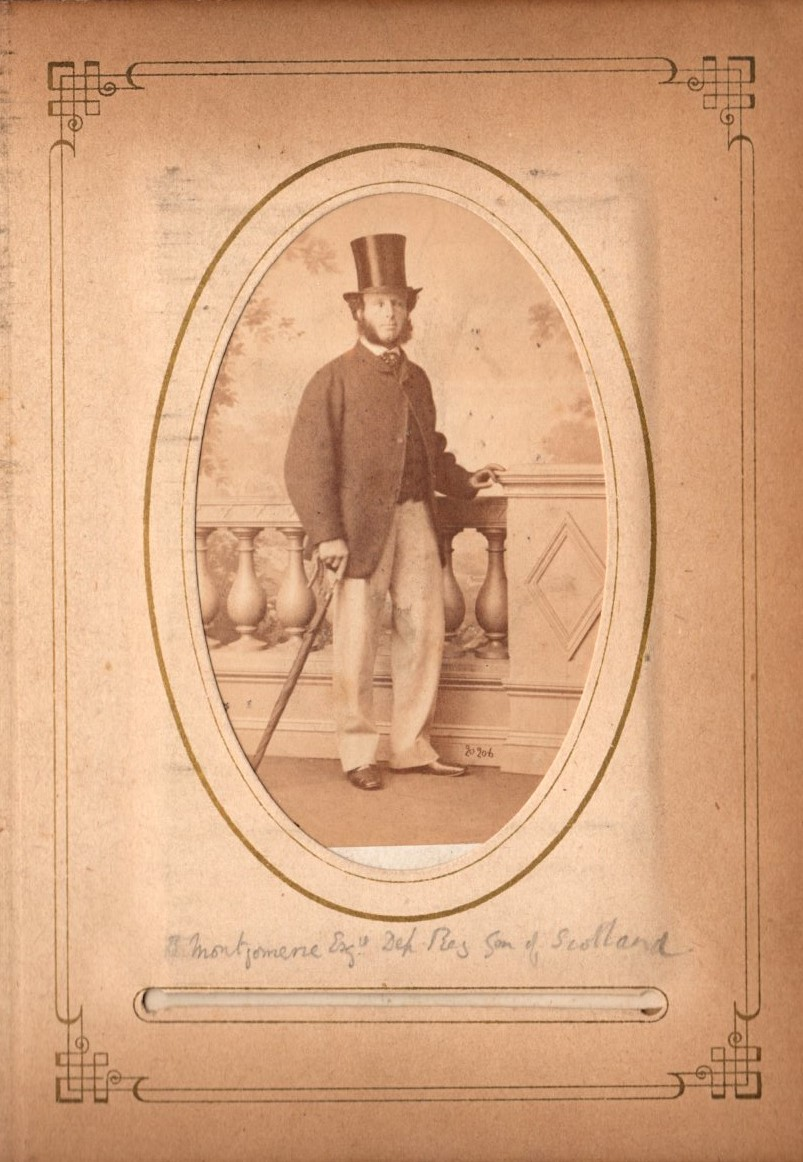

Member of Parliament for North Ayrshire
- In office 10 February 1874 – 12 April 1880
- Preceded by: William Finnie
- Succeeded by: Robert Cochran-Patrick

Personal details
- Born: 22 January 1828
- Died: 25 October 1880 (aged 52)
- Party: Conservative
- Parent(s): William Eglinton Montgomerie; Susanna Fraser Anderson

Roger Montgomerie, JP DL, (22 October 1828 – 25 October 1880) was a British Conservative politician.

Born 22 October 1828, 4th son of 9 children to William Eglinton Montgomerie and Susanna Fraser Anderson

Montgomerie was elected MP for North Ayrshire in 1874, but did not stand for re-election at the next election in 1880.

Having been educated at Rugby School, Montgomerie entered St. John’s College, Cambridge 23 November 1846 and obtained a B.A. in 1851 and M.A. in 1854. He was admitted into the Faculty of Advocates as an Advocate of the Scotch Bar in 1852 being Advocate-Depute in 1858, 1868 and 1874–1880. He was Deputy Clerk of the Register, Justice of the Peace for Ayrshire, and Deputy Lieutenant of Ayrshire.

A member of the Lodge Mother Kilwinning and Proxy Master Grand Lodge, he was nominated and elected to office for 1878 and presided over the annual Christmas festivities at the Eglinton Arms' Hall in Kilwinning, when he proposed in succession of the visiting lodges.

Described as having many amiable qualities, he was greatly respected by his political opponents as by the party which he did his best to serve. His leisure time was devoted to the cultivation of the fine arts, being very proficient in carving on wood, and in painting in oil and water colours.

Montgomerie died of typhoid fever, unmarried on 25 October 1880 at Annick Lodge, Ayrshire, the family home and is buried in the family grave alongside his paternal grandparents, parents, aunt, sister Elizabeth and brother John Eglinton Montgomerie in Dreghorn Churchyard and New Cemetery, North Ayrshire, Scotland.

Parliament of the United Kingdom
Preceded by William Finnie	Member of Parliament for North Ayrshire; 1874 – 1880	Succeeded by Robert Cochran-Patrick
