= Robert Cochran-Patrick =

Scottish Conservative politician

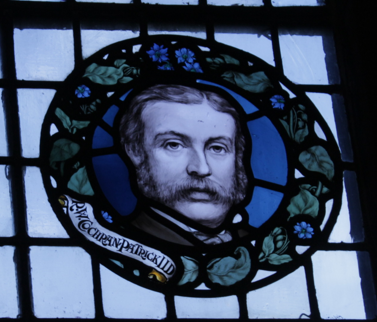
Memorial window to R W Cochran Patrick in the Scottish National Portrait Gallery

Robert William Cochran-Patrick LLD (5 February 1842 – 15 March 1897) was a Scottish Conservative politician who sat in the House of Commons from 1880 to 1885.

Cochran-Patrick was the only son of William Charles Richard Cochran of Woodside in Beith, Ayrshire, and his wife Agnes Cochran, daughter of William Cochran of Ladyland, Ayrshire. He was educated privately and then at the University of Edinburgh and Trinity Hall, Cambridge. He was a J.P. for Ayrshire and Renfrewshire and a deputy lieutenant for Ayrshire.

At the 1880 general election Cochran-Patrick was elected member of parliament for Ayrshire North. He held the seat until 1885. He was Permanent Under-Secretary for Scotland from 1887 to 1892 when he retired owing to ill-health. He was a member of the Fishery Board for Scotland from 1887 to 1888 and then Deputy Chairman from 1896.

In 1876 he published his first book, entitled 'Records of the Coinage of Scotland from the earliest Period to the Union,' in 2 volumes. This concluded the a vast proportion of Scottish coins were made from native gold and silver.

Cochran-Patrick died at the age of 55.

Cochran-Patrick married Eleanora Hunter daughter of Robert Hunter of Hunter, Ayrshire in 1866.

== Works ==
- Medieval Scotland (1892)

Parliament of the United Kingdom
Preceded by Roger Montgomerie	Member of Parliament for North Ayrshire; 1880 – 1885	Succeeded by Hugh Elliot
