= John Eglinton Montgomerie =

Scottish Royal Navy officer

Admiral John Eglinton Montgomerie CB DL JP
- Born: 23 December 1825
- Died: 10 September 1902 (aged 76)
- Military career
- Allegiance: United Kingdom
- Branch: Royal Navy
- Service years: 1840-
- Rank: Admiral
- Awards: CB

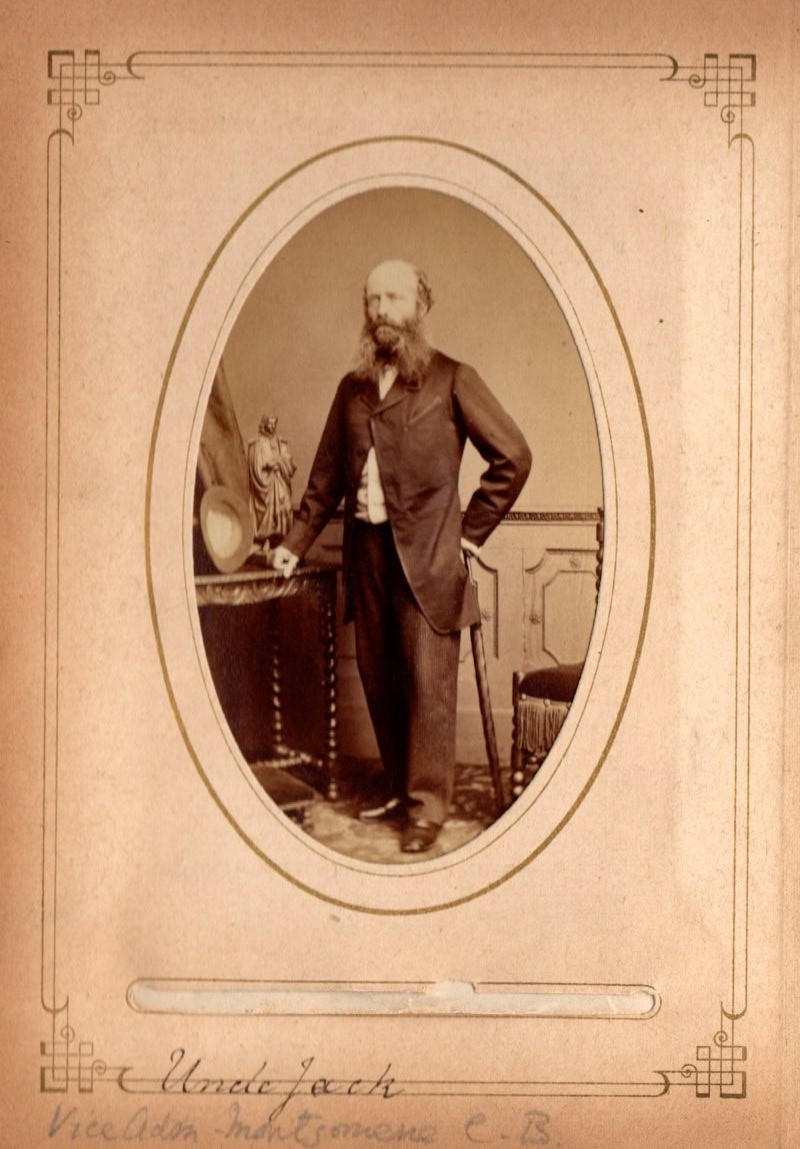
John Eglinton Montgomerie, known as Uncle Jack to his nephew, Sir John Anthony Cecil Tilley whose album this was scanned from

Admiral John Eglinton Montgomerie CB DL JP (23 December 1825 – 10 September 1902) was a Scottish Royal Navy officer.

Montgomerie was born at Dankeith, Symington, South Ayrshire, Scotland in 1825, the son of William Eglinton Montgomerie (1789–1852) by his wife Susanna Fraser Anderson (1800-1884), daughter of John Anderson, merchant of London and Susanna Fraser.

His father was from the Clan Montgomery, and a paternal descendant of Alexander Montgomerie, 6th Earl of Eglinton (1588–1661).

2 x great-nephew of Richard Oswald, in 1881 he was visiting his 1st cousin once removed, Richard Alexander Oswald (1841-1921) at Auchencruive. Oswald was the 2 x great nephew of George Oswald.

He entered the Royal Navy in 1840, holding the rank of Captain from 24 November 1862; Rear-Admiral from 09 Mar 1878; Vice-Admiral from 8 July 1884 and Admiral from 15 December 1888. He served in China during the Second Opium War, for which he received the Second China War Medal. He was Naval Aide-de-camp to Queen Victoria 1876 to 1878, became vice-admiral in 1884 and retired as admiral.

In 1871, Montgomerie was Captain of HMS Blanche (1867). and between 1872 and 1875, HMS Caledonia

He held the offices of Deputy Lieutenant (DL) and Justice of the Peace (JP) for Ayrshire, and was appointed a Companion of the Order of the Bath (CB).

In 1887, he was a director of the Ardrossan Harbour Company when, having been moved from the private ownership of the Earl of Eglinton, the company embarked upon an expansion programme to increase trade. Plans were in place to work with the Caledonian Railway Company with the primary objective of connecting the coal fields and iron works of Lanarkshire with Ardrossen.

He died unmarried at Newfield, Kilmarnock on 10 September 1902. and is buried in the family grave alongside his paternal grandparents, parents, aunt, sister Elizabeth and brother Roger Montgomerie in Dreghorn Churchyard and New Cemetery, North Ayrshire, Scotland
