= Cairnduff =

- Stewarton, East Ayrshire, Scotland
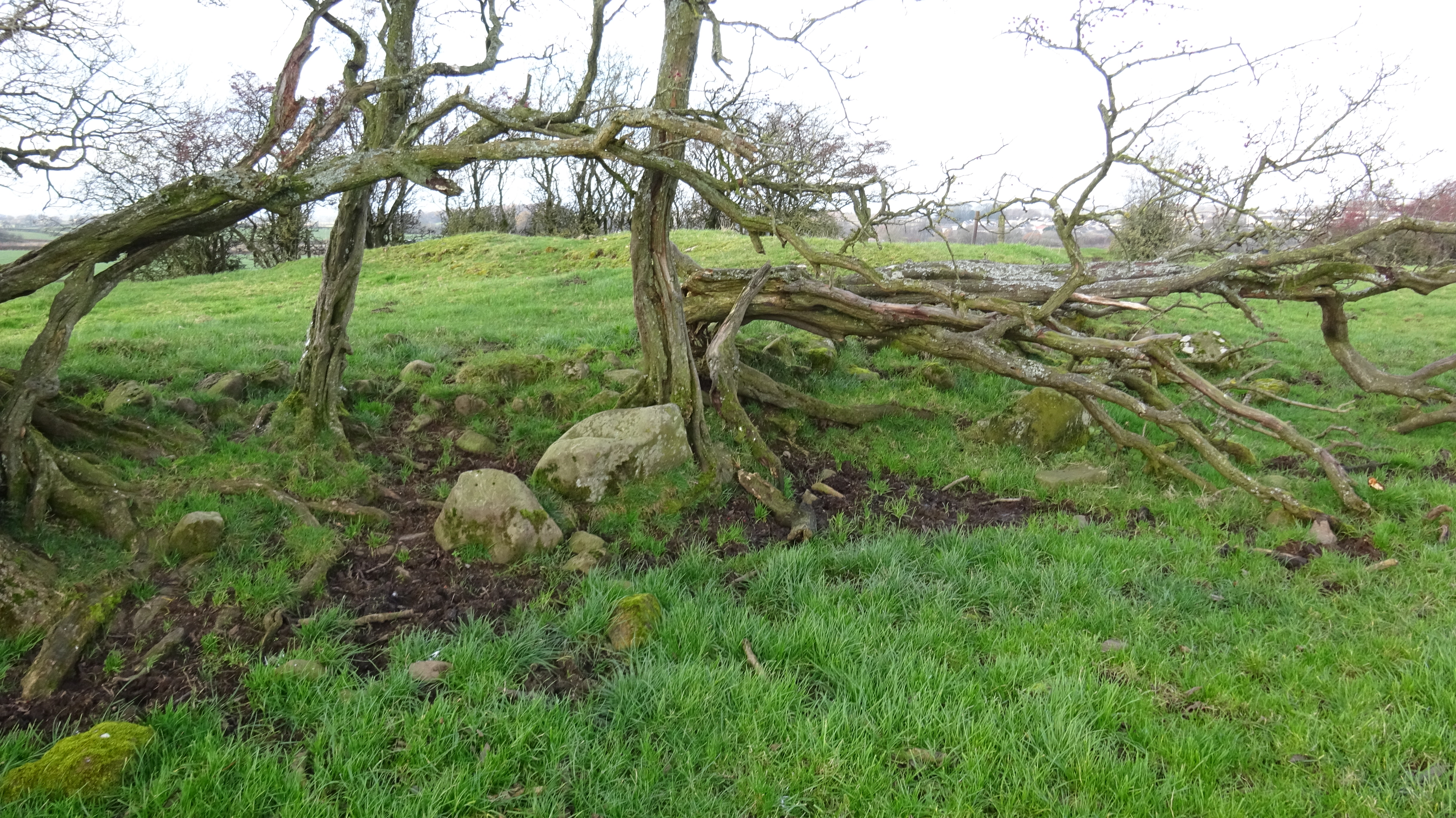
- Cairnduff Bronze Age Burial Mound

Site information
- Type: Burial Cairn
- Owner: Private land
- Open to the public: Yes
- Condition: Extensive robbing damage

Location
- Coordinates: 55.673995°N 4.5126024°W
- Grid reference: grid reference NS42094514
- Height: 0.7 metres

Site history
- Built: Unknown
- Materials: Boulder banks

Cairnduff, Cairn Duff or Carn Duff is a roughly circular Bronze Age burial cairn, located on the lands of High Peacockbank Farm near the town of Stewarton in East Ayrshire, Scotland. It was built around 3000 years ago.

== Location ==
Cairnduff is situated on the summit of Cairnduff Hill at 114m and Smith points out its prominence and that it is visible from the possible moot hill or watchtower site near High Castleton in the vicinity of Lainshaw House. The position gives clear views of Strathannick and the surrounding hills to the north and south-west.

== Description ==
Cairnduff is a type of tumulus, barrow or burial mound dating within the time period approximately 1300–700 BC, the Bronze Age. The term cairn is typically given to such structures in Scotland and refers to a stone pile, built and not of natural origin. The descriptive term cairn in this context is itself derived from the Scottish Gaelic: càrn [ˈkʰaːrˠn̪ˠ] (plural càirn [ˈkʰaːrˠɲ]).

The centre of this once circular cairn has been entirely removed due to the robbing of stones and only a low, roughly circular stoney bank around a 1.0m wide and a maximum of 0.7m high remains. Turf-covered, the cairn is located within a rectangular field bank. A significant quantity of rounded stones are still present and some are exposed to view in situ or spread around the site. A few larger boulders, possibly perimeter stones are present and the indications are that the diameter of the cairn may originally have been over 20m. The stones are whinstone and mostly large. No hammer or chisel marks were found on any of the stones.

The three urns found were buried in pits that were close to the original ground level. One urn was around a foot in diameter and the other two were 5½ inches in diameter and six inches in height, with zig-zag lines around the rim. In 1820 it was recorded that other urns might be present "as not more than a fourth part of it has yet been examined". A height of 5 to 6 feet measured in 1820 with stones possibly removed previously for road building, etc.

The site was wooded in 1779 as shown on the Lainshaw Estate map. The cairn with its contents of three cinerary urns was exposed when trees were being removed by uprooting them from this small plantation in around 1810 to 1826. These urns or beakers are recorded to have contained bones.

The Black Hill Cairn is a Bronze Age burial site near Kirkfieldbank in the Clyde Valley and is set in a similar location to Cairnduff at the highest point in the area.

== History ==
The Lainshaw Estate map of 1779 shows a Cairnduff Park and below it a Bonfire Park running down to the Annick Water. The cairn itself is not named or indicated and only a small clump of trees is shown in its location, lying just outside the Lainshaw Estate on the lands of High Peacockbank.

Circa 1810 or 1826 Mr John Deans of Peacock Bank (sic) decided to extract some small trees from his plantation on Carnduff Brae when he exposed three urns or beakers that contained bones. The position of the urns within the cairn was covered with a considerable quantity of stones and earth. The stones would have had to be collected and carried to the site, probably from the river as many are rounded and river worn. No detailed description of the urns survives other than some details of the size and their present location is not recorded.

By 1857 Mr. James Neilson Provan of Peacockbank was the landowner. The urns contained bones and relics and these vessels were found enclosed in small excavations that were close to the original ground level. One urn, around a foot in diameter, was broken whilst being removed. The remaining two urns had a diameter of 5½ inches and were six inches in height. They were made from coarse clay.

The field name 'Bonfire Park' suggests that the cairn, located at the highest point of ground overlooking Stewarton, may have been the site of traditional bonfires, such as those related to Halloween.

The typical burial ritual of the time involved the corpse being laid under a funeral pyre and burnt, together with any artefacts. Once cremated the surviving bones were carefully separated from the ashes and placed inside an urn that was inverted and buried in a pit. The ashes, charcoal and other remains of the pyre may have been buried in a pit nearby. The whole was covered in stones and earth to form a cairn.

== Views of Cairnduff ==
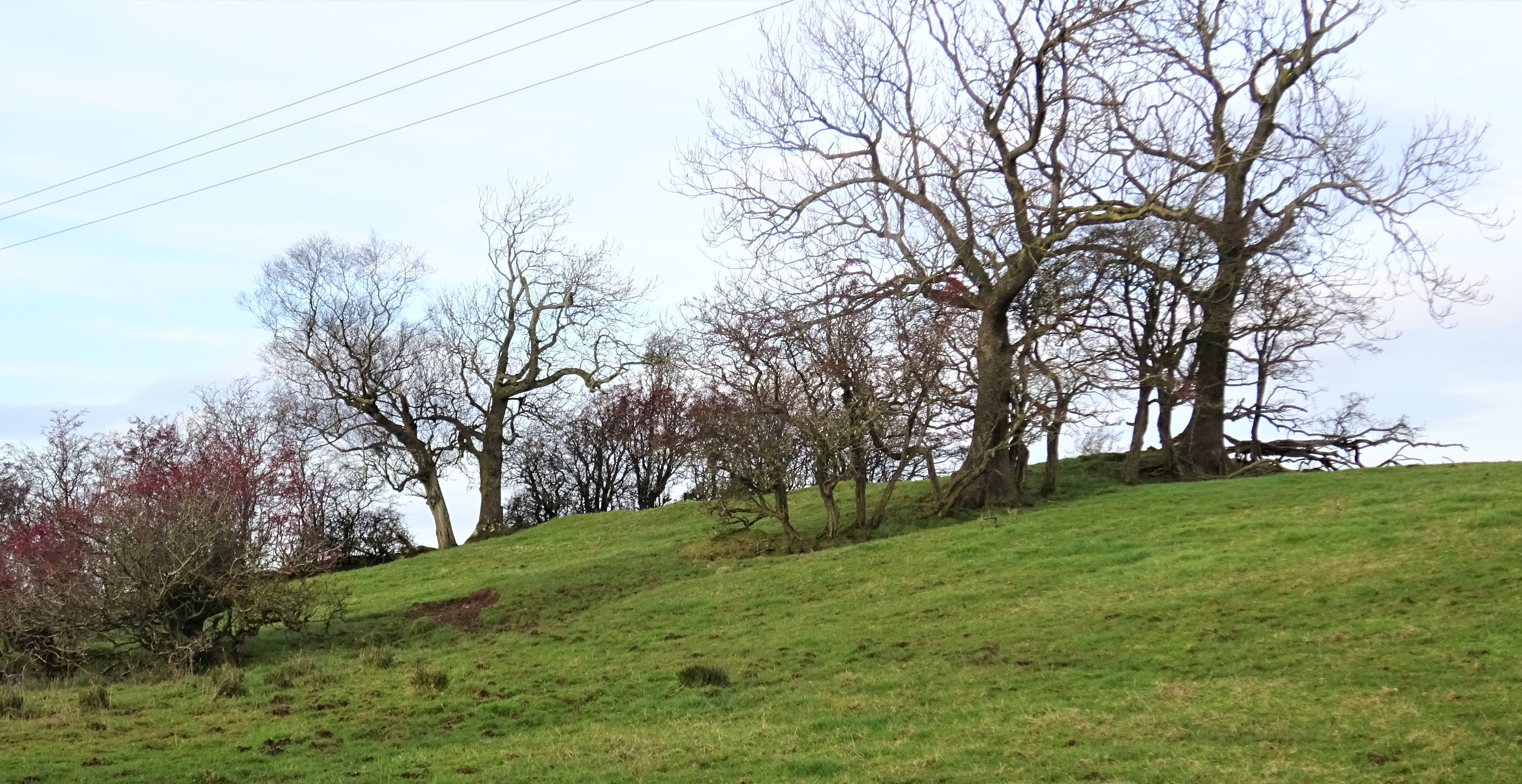
The Cairn's site on Cairnduff Brae as seen from the east.

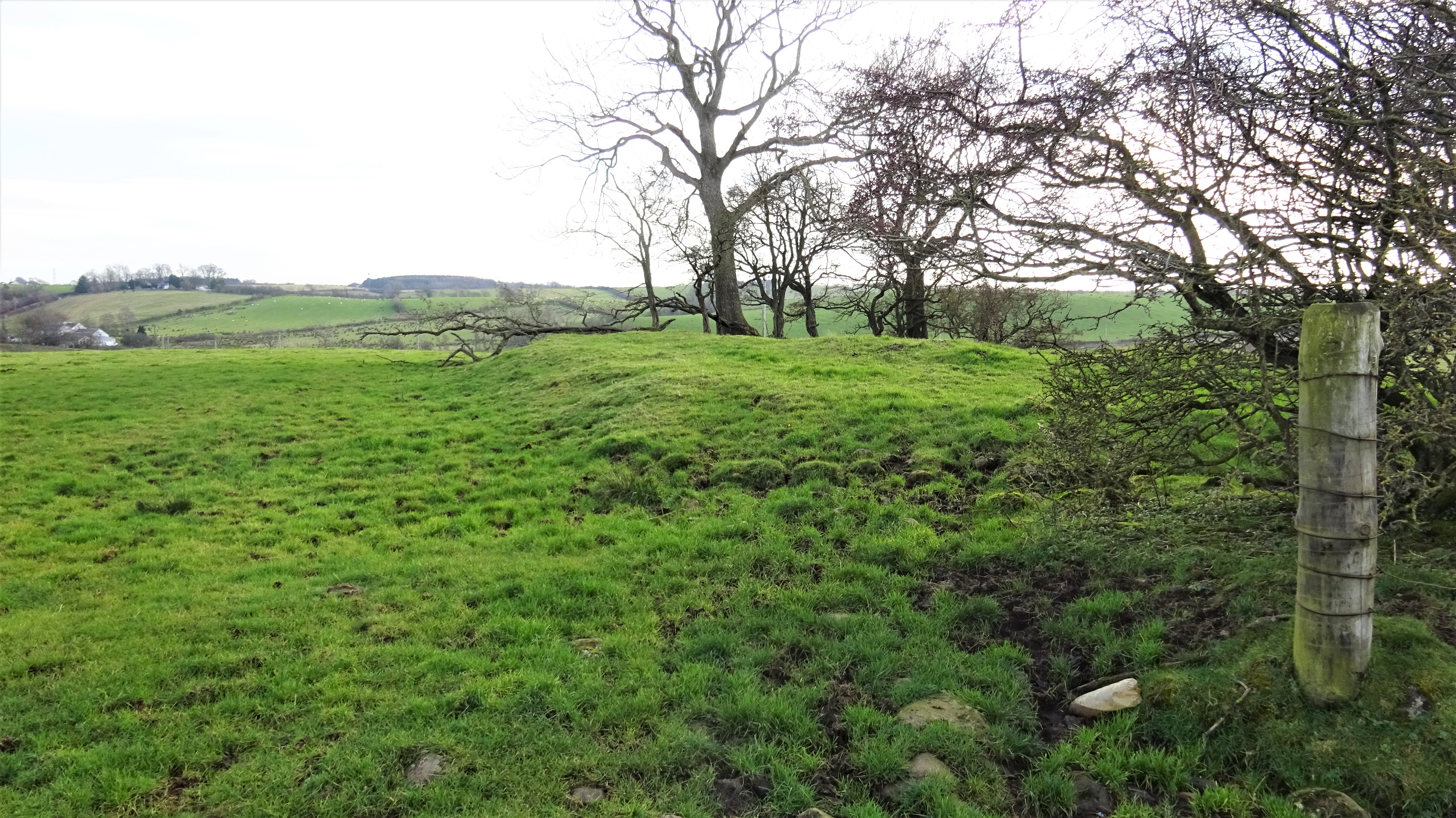
The remnants of the cairn.

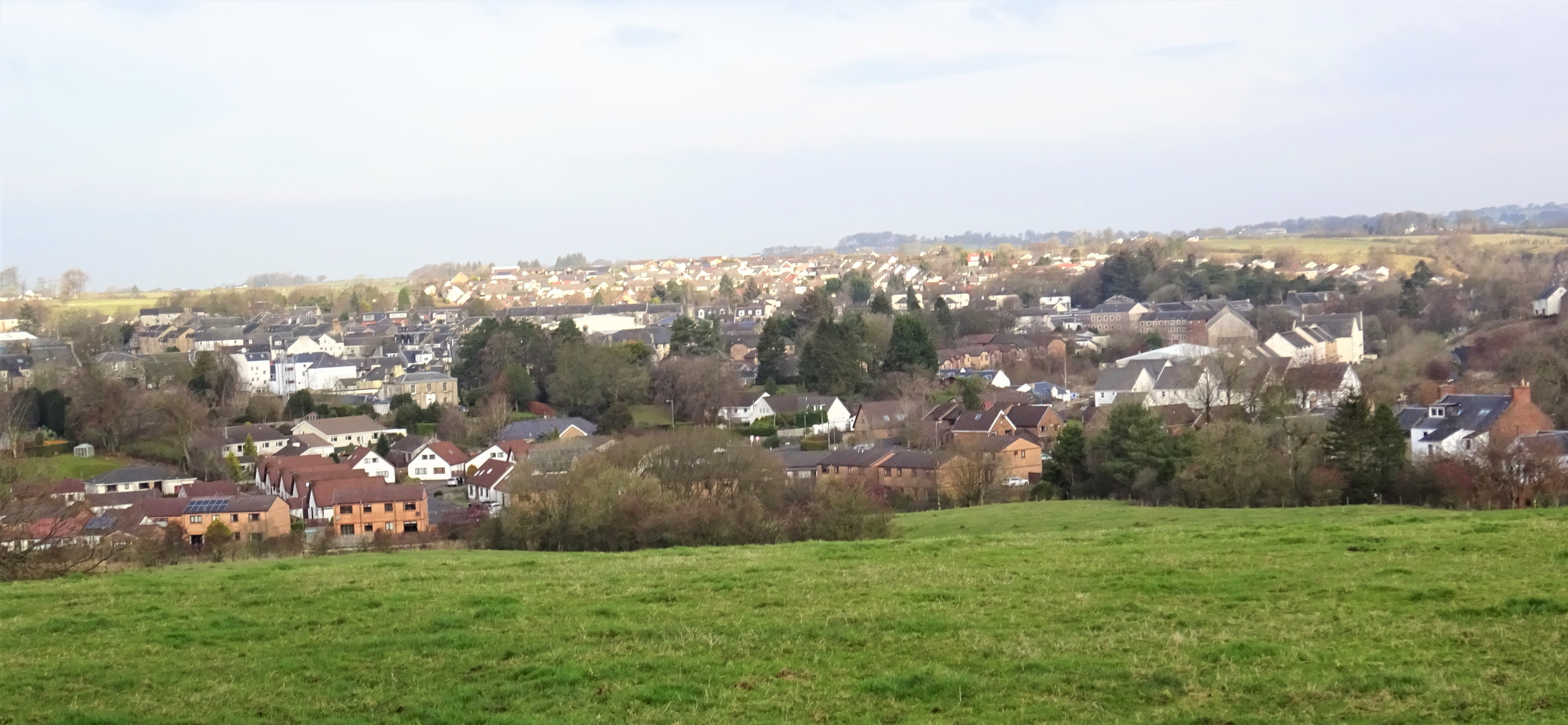
The view of Stewarton.

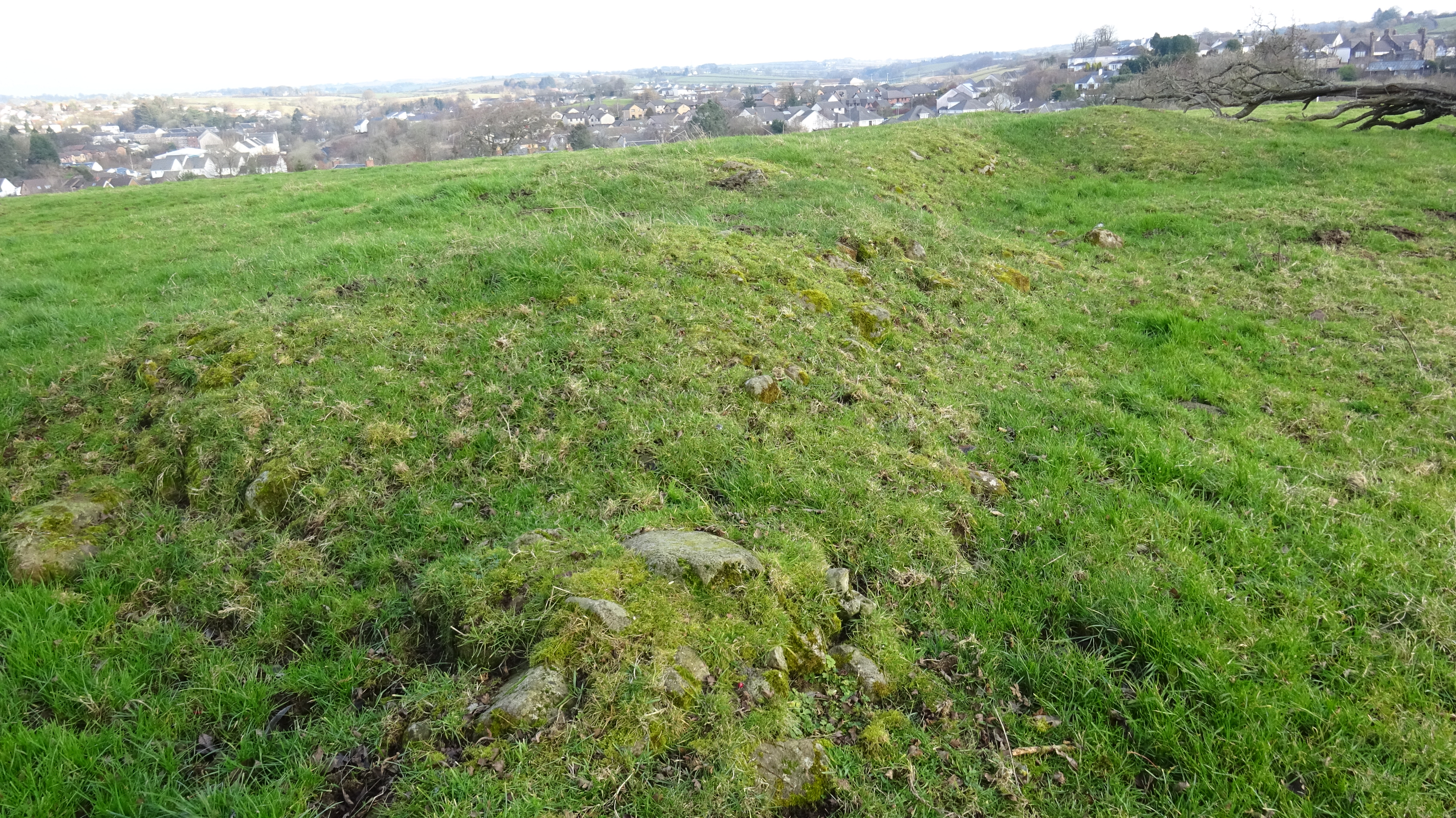
Stones within the cairn.

== See also ==
- Kemp Law Dun
- Lawthorn

== Bibliography ==
- Crawford, William (1779). Plan of the Estate of Lainshaw. William Cunninghame Esq.
- Drummond, Peter (2019). Scottish Hill Names, Scottish Mountaineering Trust. ISBN 978-0-907521-95-2.
- MacKie, Euan (2004). A Burial Ground of the Middle Bronze Age at Girvan. Friends of the McKechnie Institute. ISBN 0-9544219-1-4.
- Paterson, James (1863–66). History of the Counties of Ayr and Wigton. V (II) - Cunninghame. Edinburgh: J. Stillie.
- Smith, J. (1895). Prehistoric Man in Ayrshire. London : Elliot Stock.
