= Dundonald, South Ayrshire =

Village in South Ayrshire, Scotland

Coordinates: 55.578°N 4.594°W

Dundonald: Scottish Gaelic: Dùn Dhòmhnaill
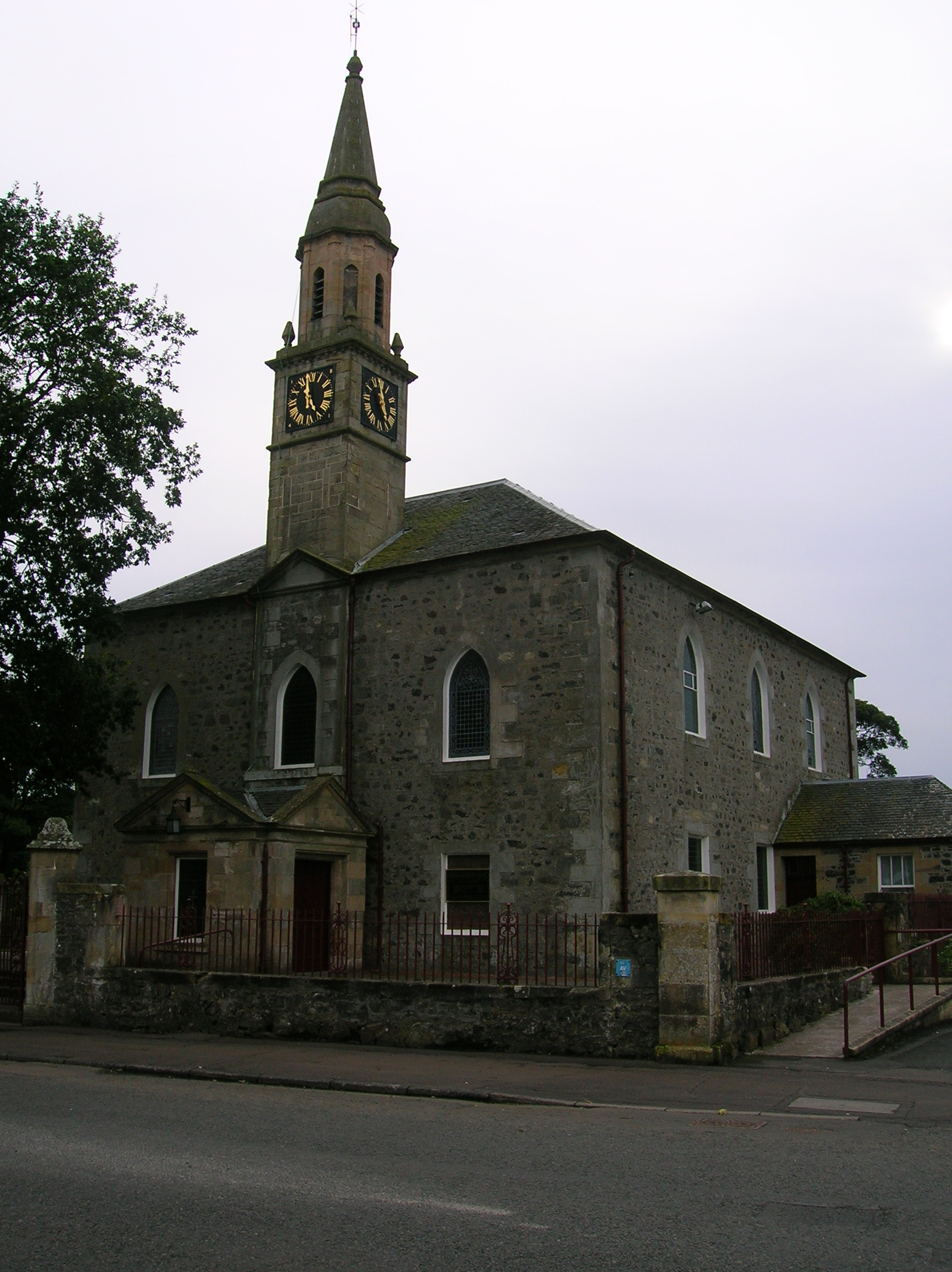
- Dundonald Parish Church

- Location within South Ayrshire
- Population: 2,570 (2020)
- OS grid reference: NS365345
- Council area: South Ayrshire
- Lieutenancy area: Ayrshire and Arran
- Country: Scotland
- Sovereign state: United Kingdom
- Post town: KILMARNOCK
- Postcode district: KA2
- Police: Scotland
- Fire: Scottish
- Ambulance: Scottish
- UK Parliament: Central Ayrshire
- Scottish Parliament: Carrick, Cumnock and Doon Valley

Dundonald (Gaelic: Dùn Dhòmhnaill) is a village in South Ayrshire, Scotland.

== The village ==
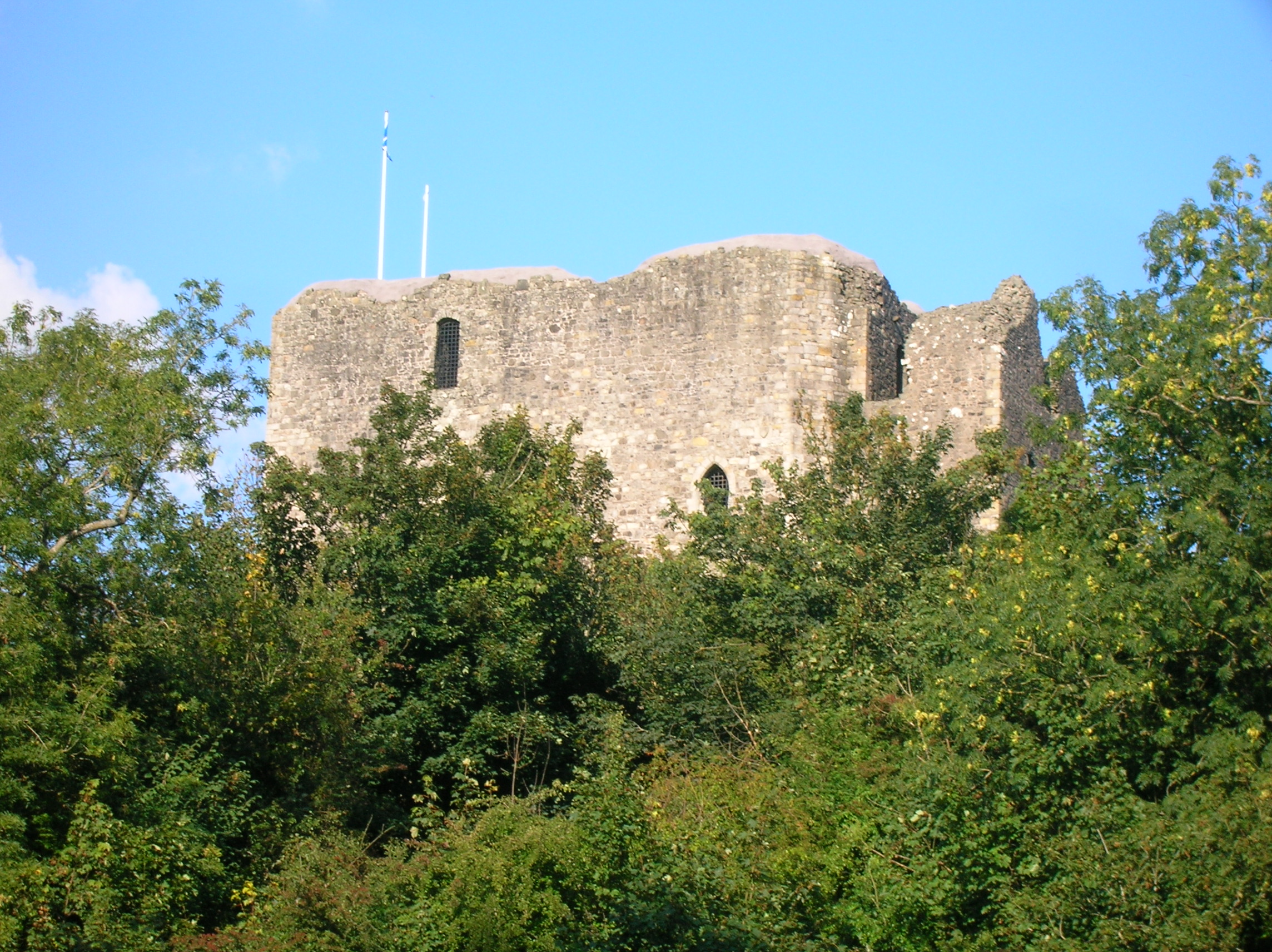
Dundonald Castle from the Old Bank woods

The village is mostly known for Dundonald Castle, which was built in the 14th century by King Robert II, on the ruins of a stone castle built in the late 13th century by Alexander Stewart, 4th High Steward of Scotland. It served the Scottish kings for 150 years.

The ruins of Old Auchans Castle lies nearby, the previous residence of Susanna Montgomery, Lady Eglinton. In Dundonald Woods near the old Hallyards Farm are the ruins of Kemp Law Dun, an Iron Age vitrified hillfort, close to the site of St Mary's Chapel.

Since 1945, it serves mostly as a dormitory town for the larger towns in the area (Ayr, Irvine, Kilmarnock and Troon).

== The parish church ==
The present church (NS 366 343) was built in 1803, however the first recorded church was present in 1229 when it was gifted to the convent at Damilling and later to Paisley Abbey, with whom it stayed until the Reformation.

Views in and around Dundonald

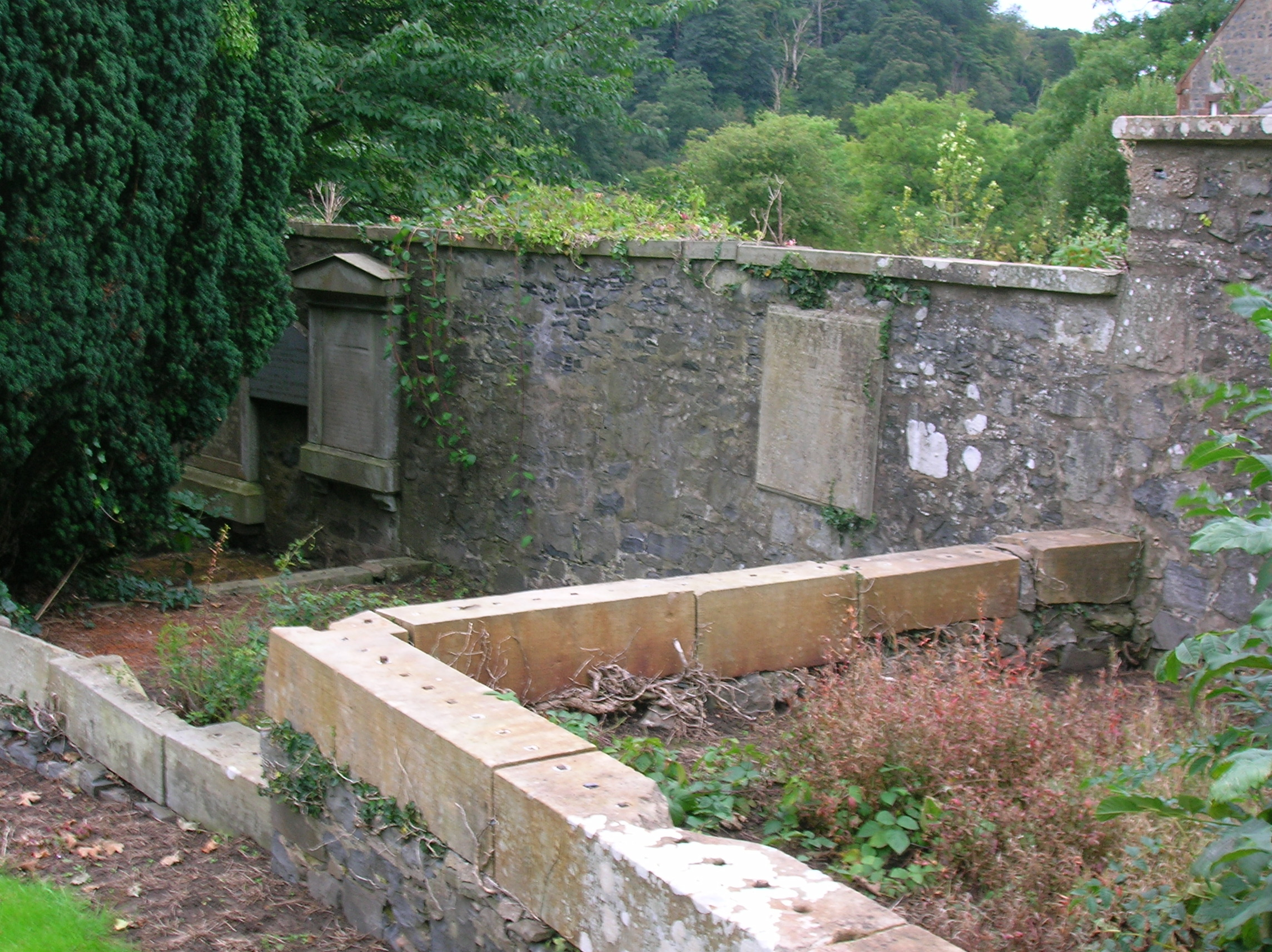
The Auchans Burial Ground, Dundonald Parish Church

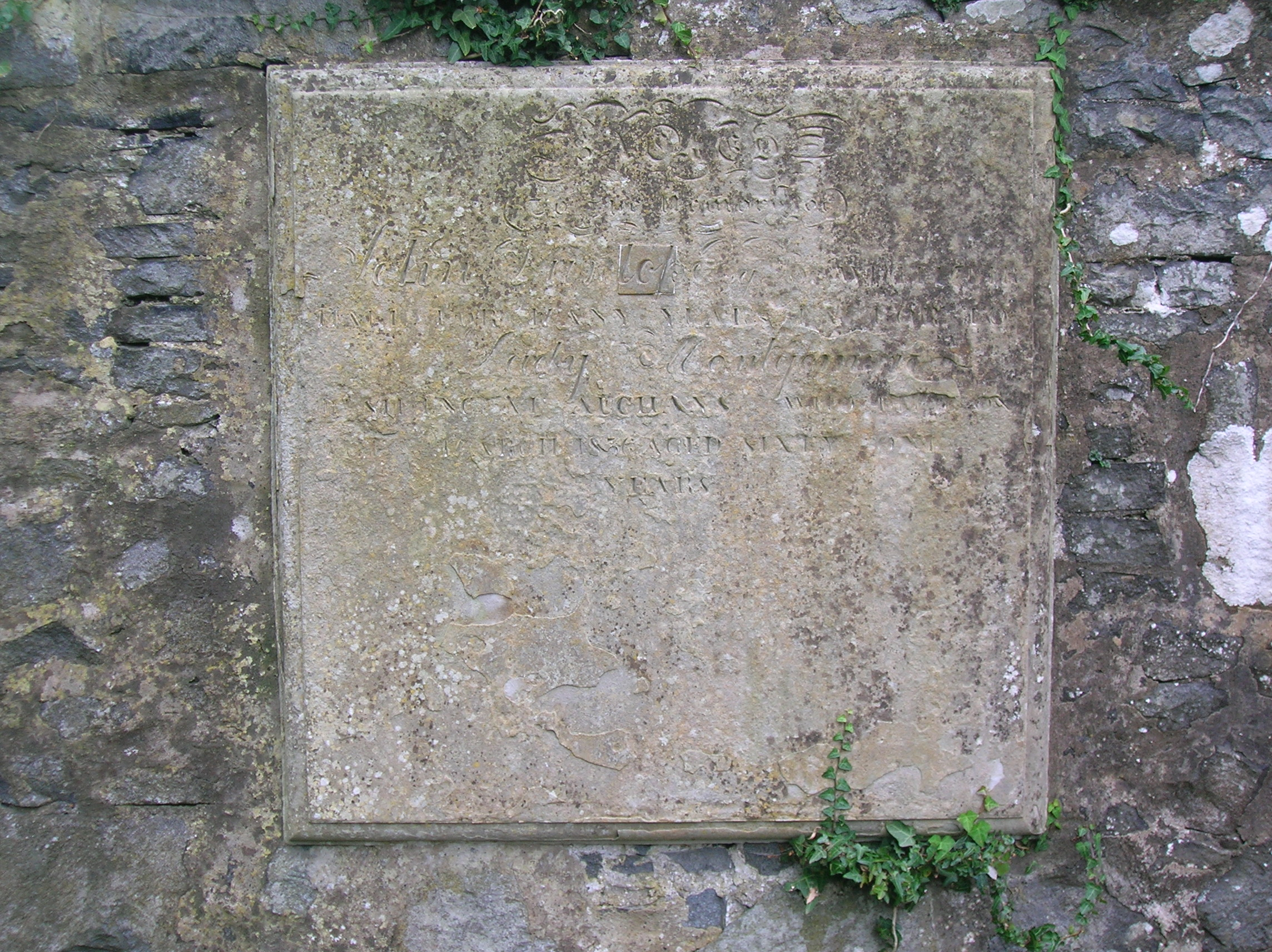
Memorial to John Dunlop Esq., who lived to over ninety years of age; onetime Factor at Auchans Castle.

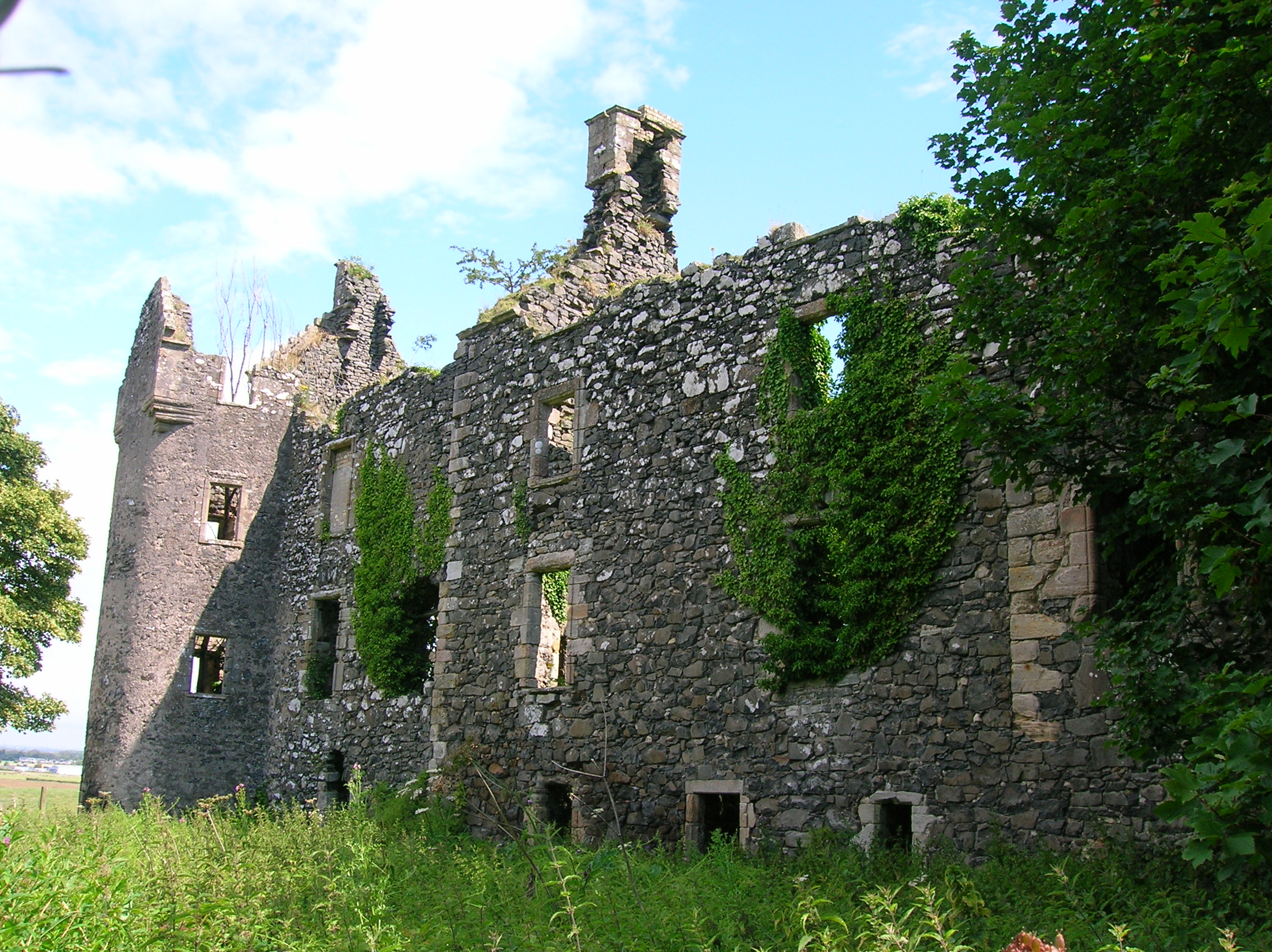
A view from the South-East of Auchans House ruins in 2009

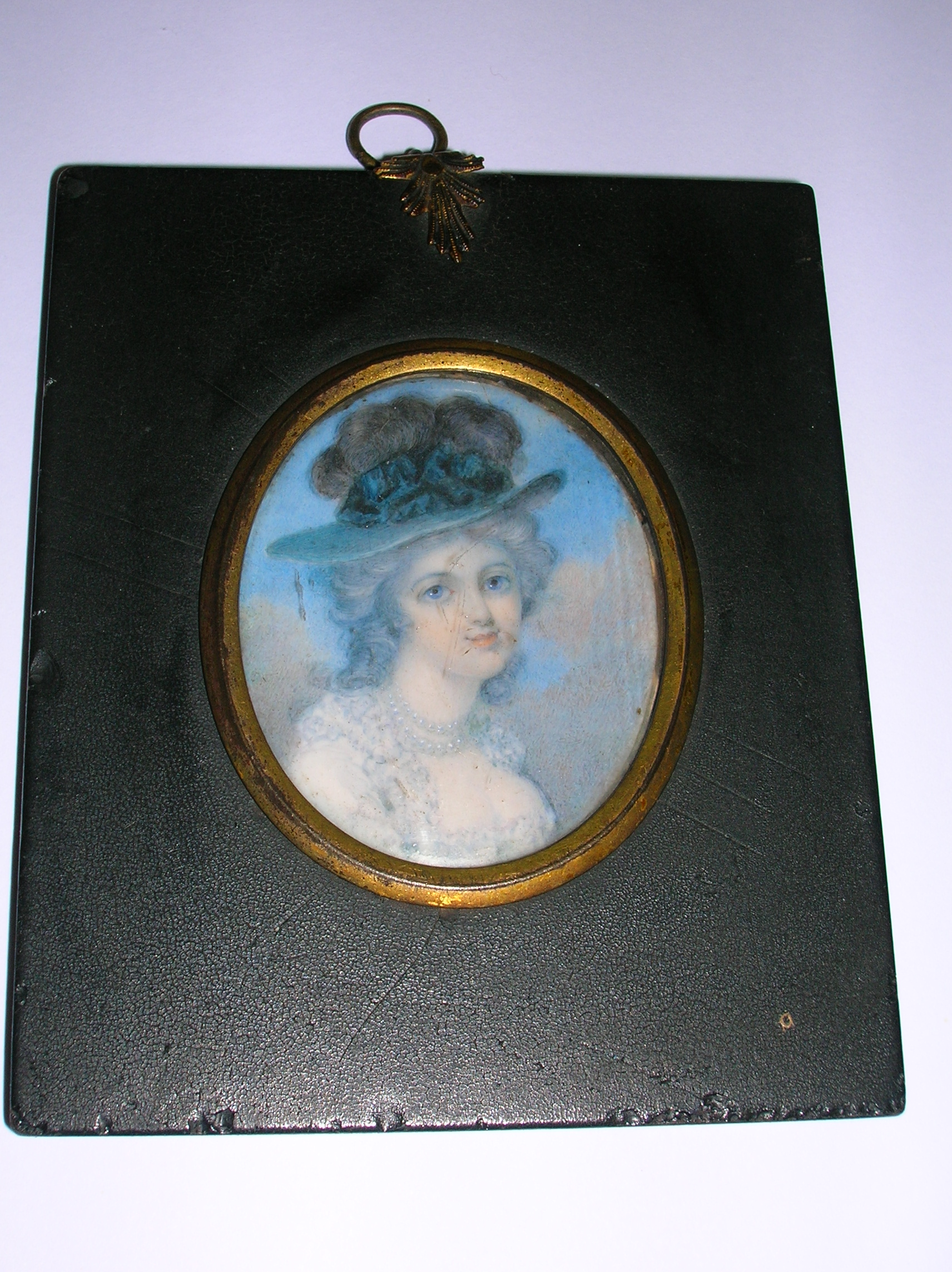
A miniature of Susanna Montgomery, Lady Eglinton, Dowager Countess. Circa 1710.

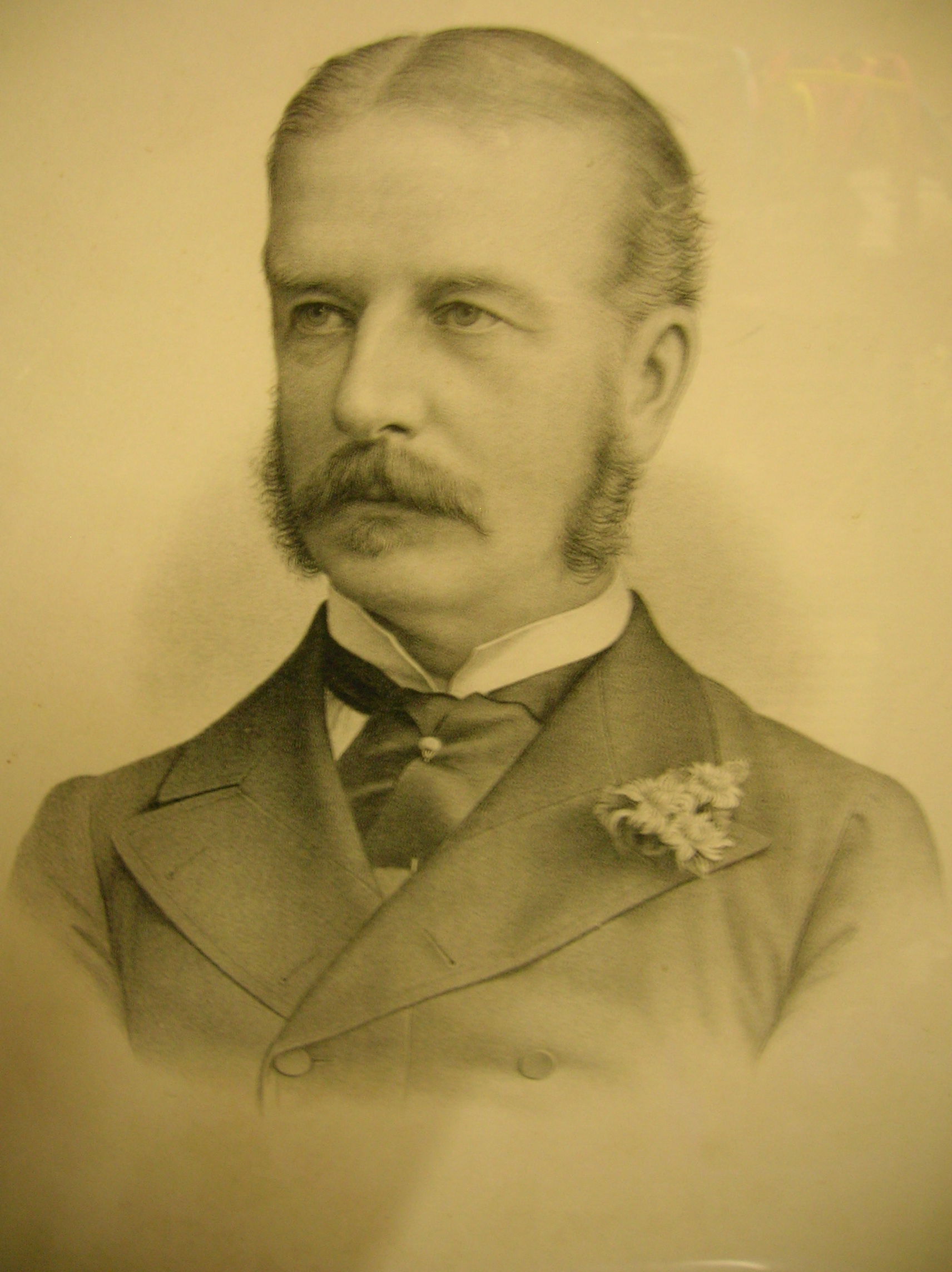
Commissioner Vernon of the Eglinton estates.

== New Auchans House ==
A new Auchans House (NS 36035 34900) was built circa 1819, designed by William Wallace. The house was built for the Earl of Eglinton's commissioner Monteaulieu Burgess of Coilsfield, followed in 1885 by the Hon. Greville Richard Vernon, son of the 1st Lord Lyveden. Major Coats of the Paisley thread manufacturers tenanted the house at one time, as did the Beattie banking family. In 1947 the Earl of Eglinton sold the house to the Earl of Dundonald. The house was then sold by the Earl of Dundonald in 1960 to a builder and finally demolished in 1970 and the site has since been developed as a housing estate on the edge of the town.

== Natural history ==
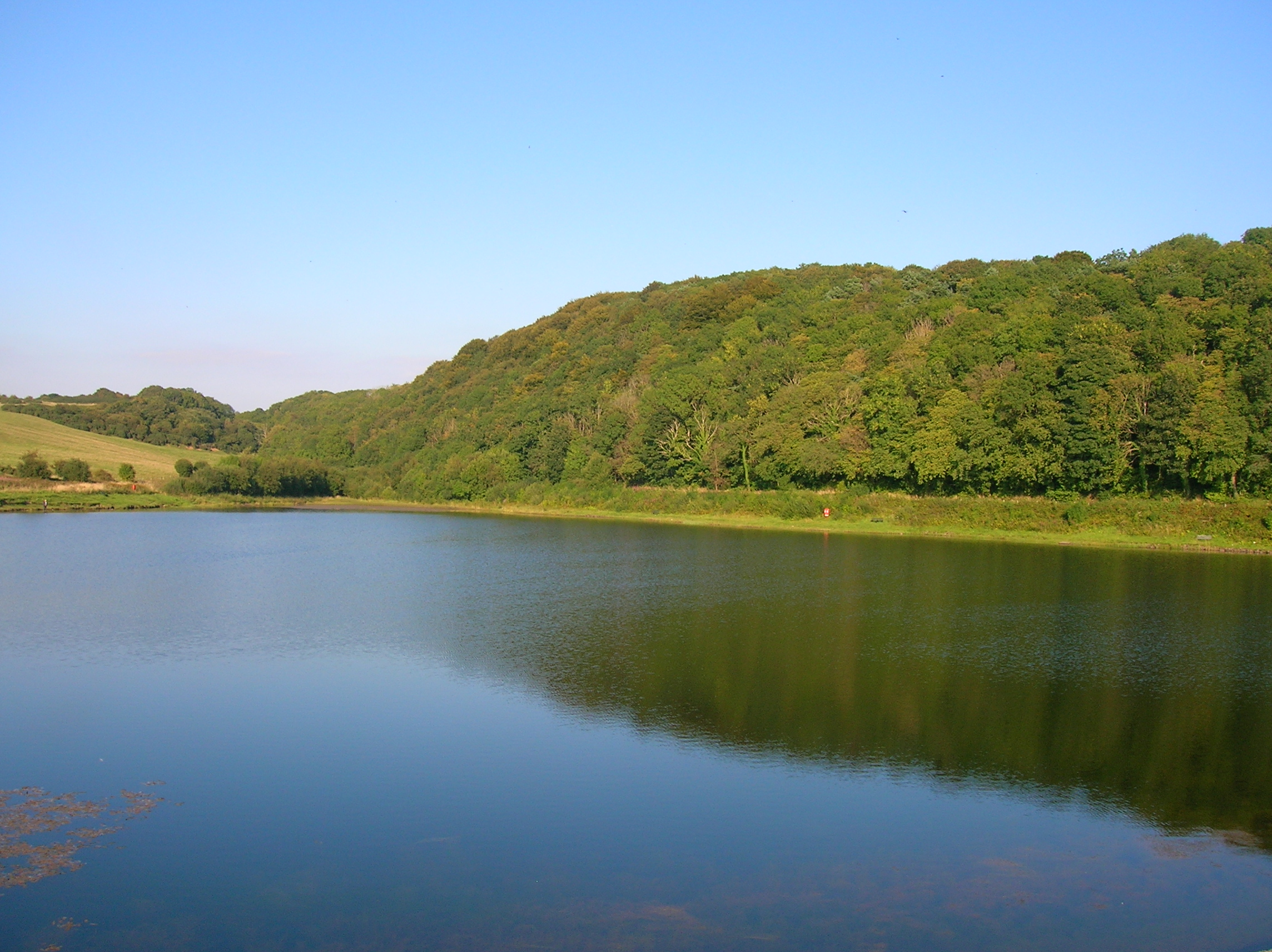
Aught Woods and Collennan Reservoir.

Dundonald Woods (NS363343) are one of the most extensive areas of elm-dominated woodlands in Ayrshire. Ash, oak and sycamore are also abundant; much of the policies are composed of derelict-coppiced-type growth from trees felled in the Second World War. Some conifer plantations are present. Wetland habitats are also present, including the Collennan Reservoir, springs and a eutrophic loch, contributing to the high biodiversity of the site. Dog's Mercury, Wood Melick, Broad-leaved Helleborine, and Giant Bellflower are amongst the significant plants present.

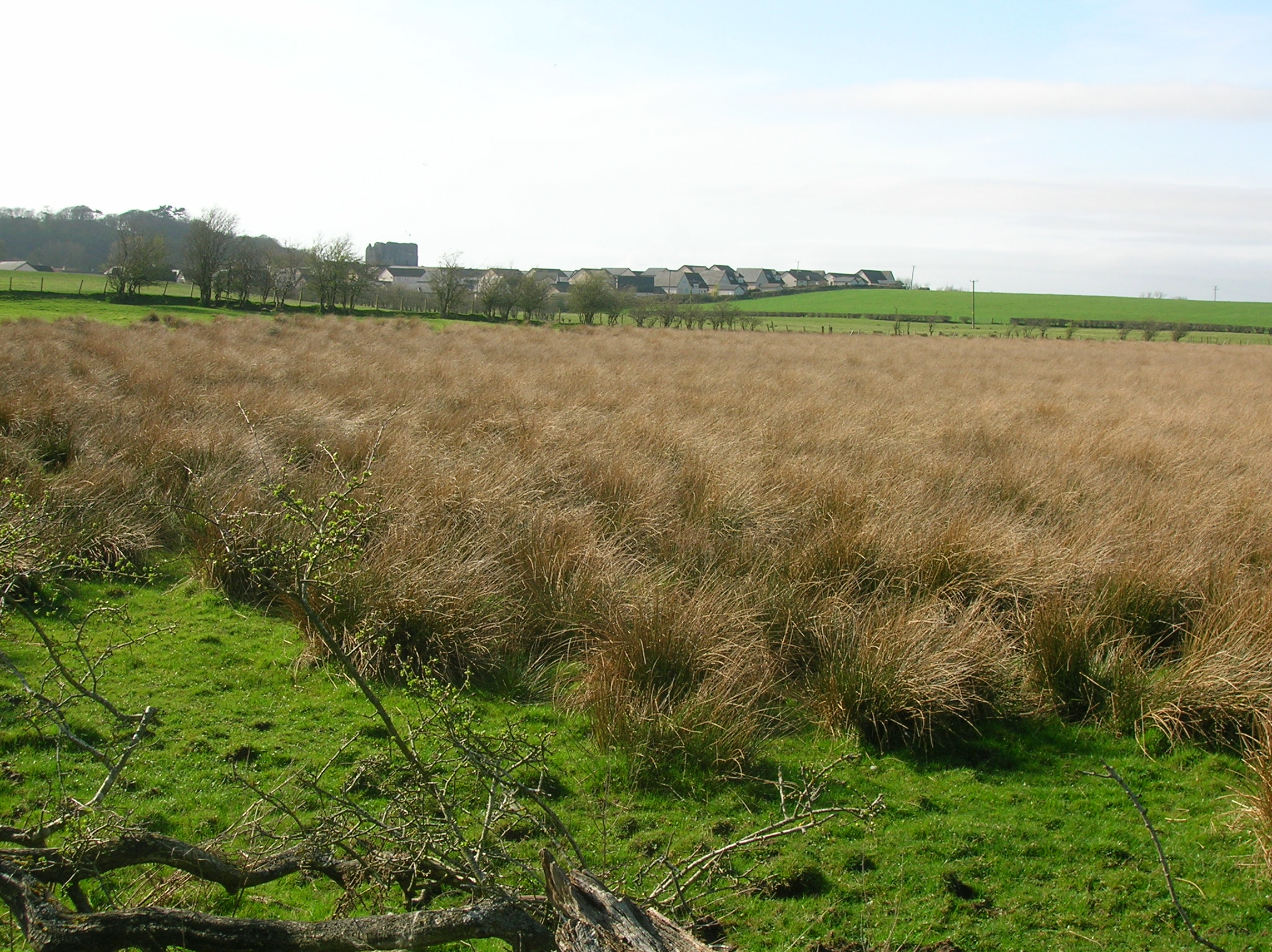
The site of Galrigs Loch with Dundonald in the background.

The small loch of Galrigs was located near Laurieston Farm and the ruin of Lochside Farm; it is now evident as a marshy area dominated by rushes. Galrigs was the old name for the lands of Newfield.

== Sport ==
=== Troon Dundonald A.F.C. ===
The prominent sports team in the village is Troon Dundonald A.F.C.

The club was formed in 1983 by 3 'ageing' players, at which time they were named Troon Burns A.F.C., and have now surpassed their 30th season in the Ayrshire Amateur Football Association. During this time they have had a few name changes, sometimes due to sponsorship commitments, but in 1998/99 season, they settled on Troon Amateurs Football Club.

In the years since their formation, they have enjoyed 3 promotions in back to back seasons, 1983/84 through 1985/86, which saw them go from the 4th Division to the 1st of Ayrshire's Amateur Leagues, which is one of the largest & toughest amateur leagues in Scotland.

In recent years, the club have developed to add youth teams below the amateur structure.

In 2021 the club dug up the playing fields without properly consulting the community or obtaining the correct approvals, and were instructed to submit a retrospective planning application which is available for public comment.

The planning application was ultimately approved by South Ayrshire Council on 17 November 2022. However, the approval had two caveats that had to be complied with by February 2023. Those caveats were not attended to. As a consequence of that South Ayrshire Council took back the lease on the field on 4 September 2023. In conjunction with Ayrshire Roads Alliance, South Ayrshire Council are taking steps to rectify the outstanding drainage issues on the field. The timescale for this is to be completed in the Spring of 2024.

=== Dundonald Highland Games ===
The main sports event in Dundonald is the annual "Dundonald Highland Games" which brings the whole village together for the weekend in sport.

== The Slough of Despond ==
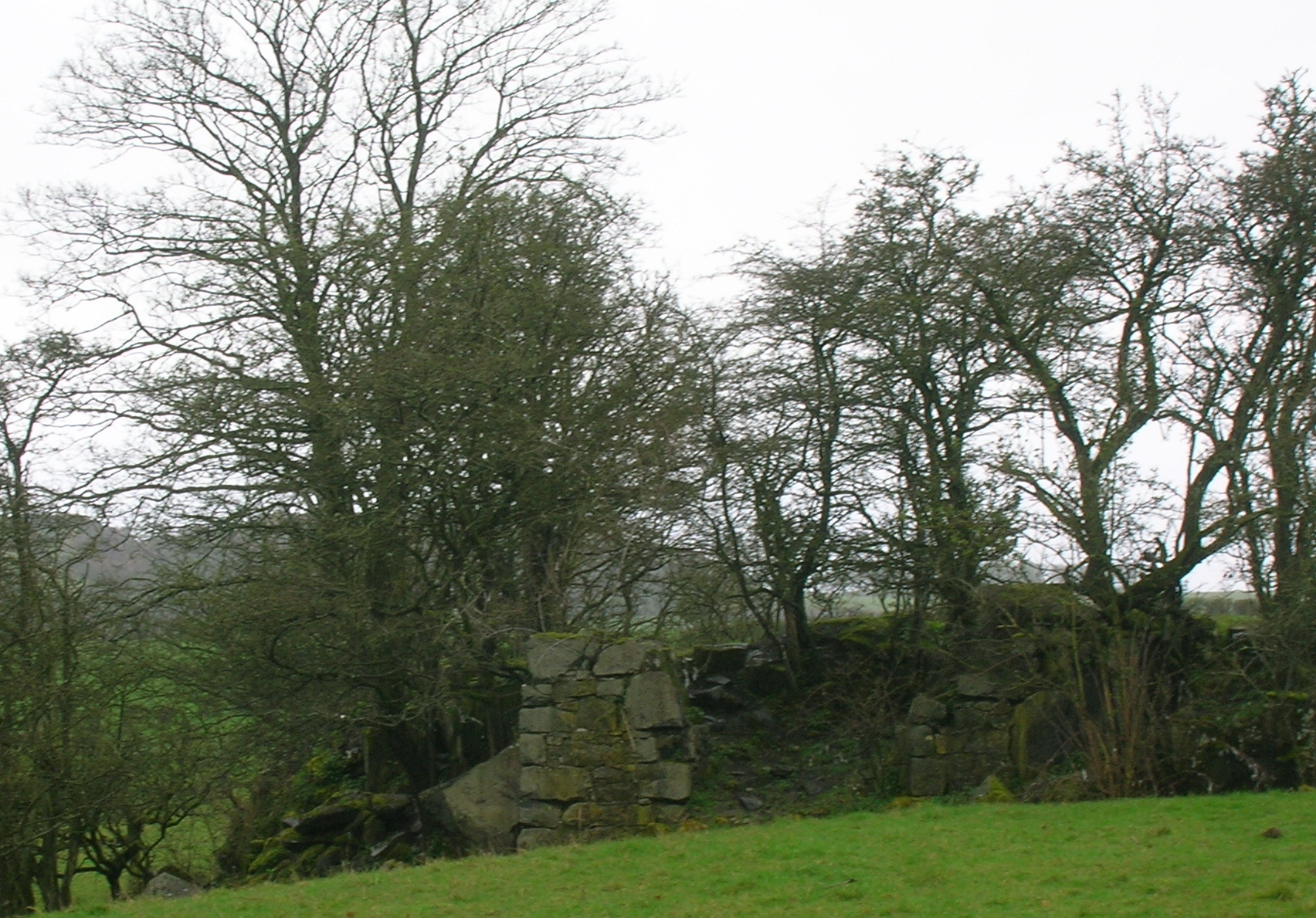
The old limekiln

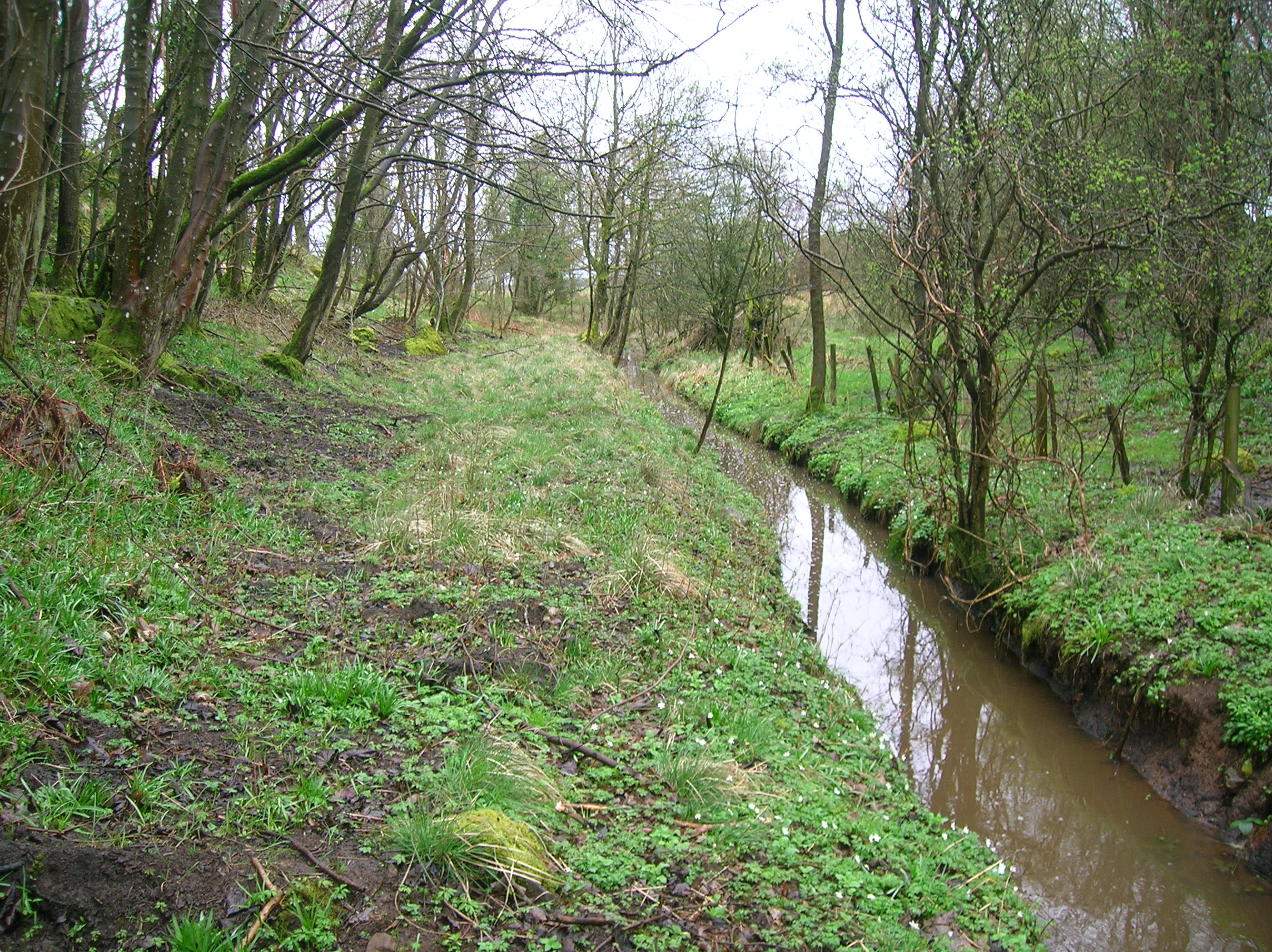
The Slough Burn in the Slough of Despond.

On the boundary of Dundonald and Symington parishes lies an area known as the 'Slough of Despond'. The original Slough of Despond is a deep bog in John Bunyan's allegory The Pilgrim's Progress into which the character Christian sinks under the weight of his sins and his sense of guilt for them.

The burn in this area, rising near the old Broadhirst Farm, has long been known as the Slough, the Scots equivalent spelling is Sleugh, meaning a marsh or quagmire. It is not known how the name 'Slough of Despond' was added to the area, however it is recorded since the mid 19th century and may be linked to the nearby limekilns that were generally notorious for the acrid 'hell-like' smoke that issued from them.

The Slough Burn still rises from the marshy area below the Broadhirst Woods, however the limestone quarry that served the limekilns is now abandoned, surviving as an area rich in wildlife, containing old woodland indicator plants such as Wood Anemone (Anemone nemorosa), Bluebell (Hyacinthoides non-scripta), Wood Sorrel (Oxalis acetosella), Dog's Mercury (Mercurialis perennis), Herb Robert (Geranium robertianum) and other species. The Slough Burn runs down past Dankeith House, Templeton and Fortacres, Todrigs and through Caprington, to join the River Irvine near Gatehead.

== Events ==
- August - "Dundonald Highland Games" - Traditional Scottish Highland Games.
- May - "Dundonald Music Festival" - A weekend of booked bands and jam sessions.

== See also ==
- Murder of James Young
