= Galrigs Loch (South Ayrshire) =

Coordinates: 55°34′34.0″N 4°34′53.8″W

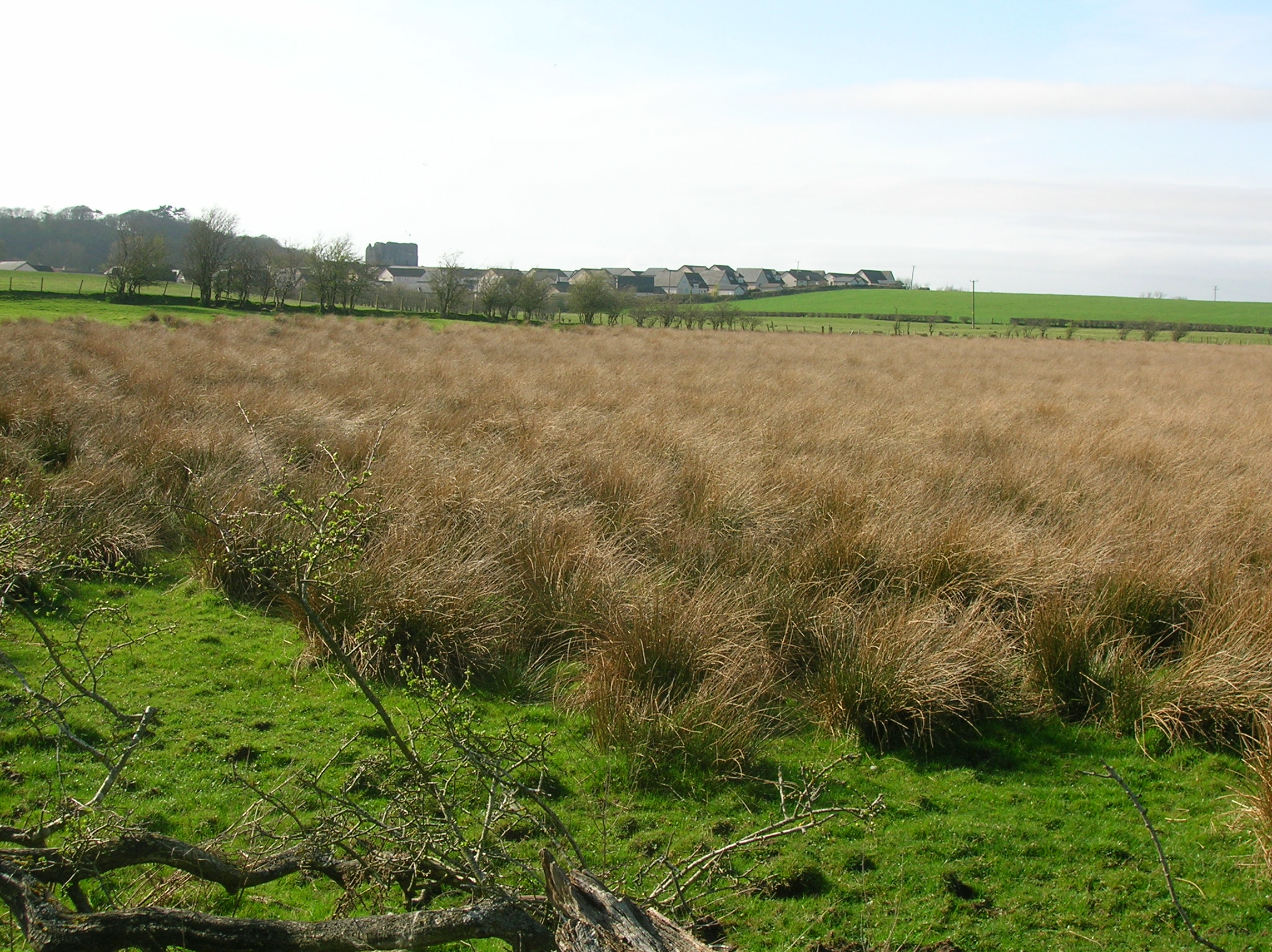
- The site of the loch looking towards Dundonald and the castle

- Location of Galrigs Loch, North Ayrshire
- Location: Dundonald, South Ayrshire, Scotland
- Type: Old freshwater loch
- Primary inflows: Broomhill Burn
- Primary outflows: Dundonald Burn
- Basin countries: Scotland
- Max. length: 800 yards (730 m)
- Max. width: 600 yards (550 m)
- Average depth: Shallow
- Islands: None

The Galrigs Loch was a substantial freshwater loch situated in low lying area between Newfield and Dundonald in South Ayrshire, Scotland. It was drained in the early 18th century.

== History ==
The loch was a natural feature, a post-glacial 'Kettle Hole' once of a substantial extent, fed mainly by the Broomhill Burn, rainfall, and field drainage. It is recorded in the placenames of Lochend, Lochside, and Mosside. The Broomhill Burn has been diverted away from the site which however remains dominated by rushes (Juncus species) and constitutes poor quality grazing. The loch site still floods in winter. No open outflow is now present and the site shows evidence of drainage in the form of rig and furrow.

The lands, variously known as 'Gariggis', 'Galriggis' and even 'Garrix', were held by a William Wallace in 1578, later by the Craufurds, and in the 1860s by the well known Finnie family from Kilmarnock who were heavily involved in the coal industry.

=== Usage ===
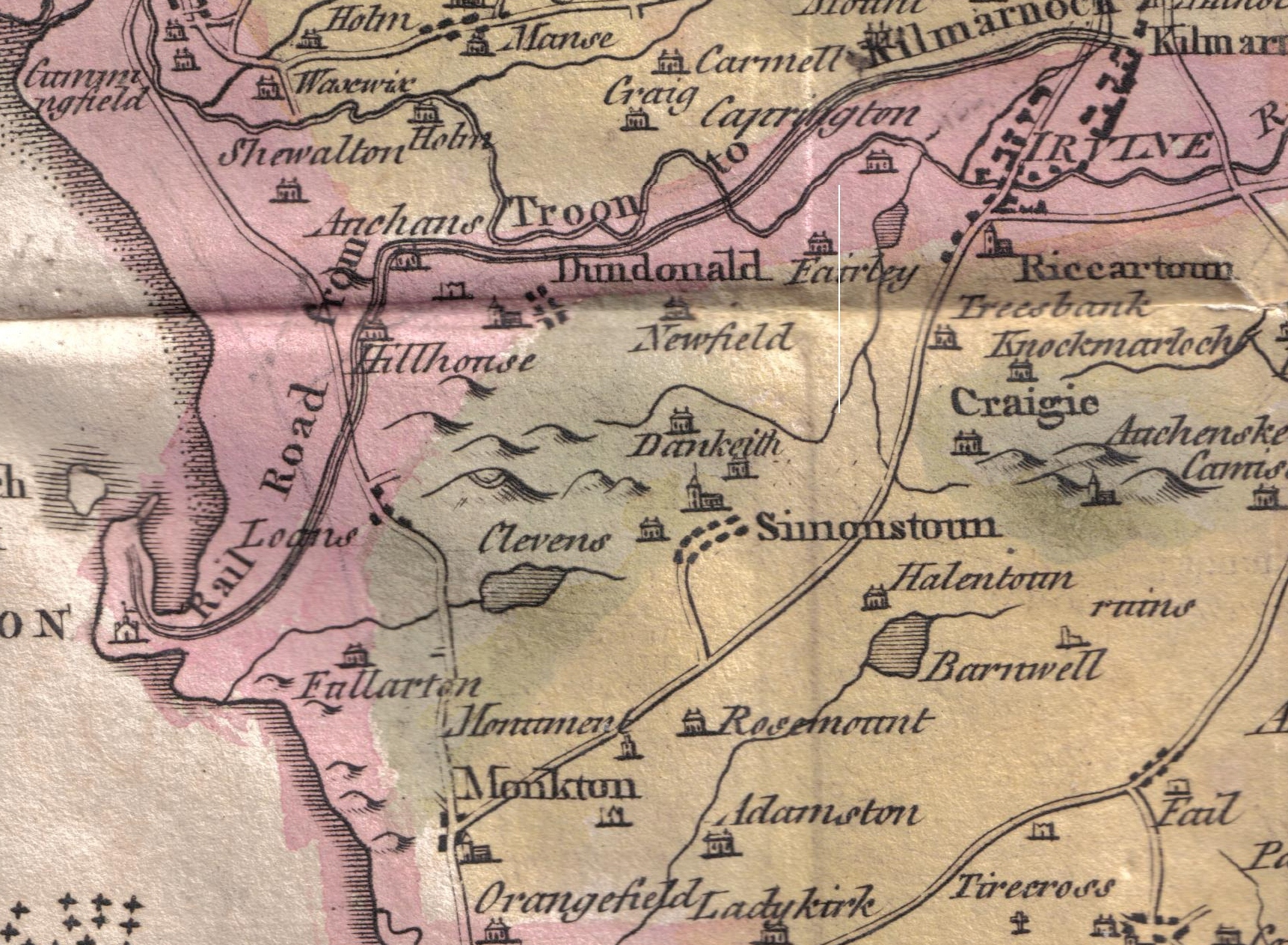
The site of Galrigs Loch lay in between Dundonald and Newfield.

No watermills seem to have been associated with Galrigs Loch and the Ordnance Survey maps of the mid 19th century only show the farm of Lochend or Lochside sitting above the old loch's site, approached by a lane, hedged on both sides, leading down from Newfield Mains. It may have been used for curling, however Newfield House had its own curling pond, opened on 4 February 1856, the site of Eglinton Jug playdowns. The 'Finnie Kettle' annual curling competition also took place at Newfield with a "..tea kettle modelled as a curling stone.." as the challenge cup. This competition still takes place at an indoor rink.

At the foot of the brae below where the now demolished Newfield House was situated, are remains of a stone dam and sluice.

=== Cartographic evidence ===
Blaeu's map of 1654, dating from Timothy Pont's survey of circa 1604, shows the loch as a significant body of water, extending towards Gar Rigs (sic), with no inflow and one outflow running down to the Dundonald Burn and eventually into the River Irvine near Shewalton. The farm on the loch's edge is recorded as Mosside. This is the last map to show the loch and this indicates that its drainage took place in the early 18th century. Roy's map of 1747 shows no clear loch, however a habitation recorded as 'Lochend' is present. The OS maps record the farm's name as 'Lochside'.

=== Drainage ===
Although the loch's drainage may have begun in the 18th century when Alexander Montgomerie, 10th Earl of Eglinton, was pursuing a number of agricultural improvements on his extensive estates and other landowners followed his example. Intensive drainage work may also have taken place in the 1740s as part of the improvements undertaken to provide employment for Irish estate workers during the Irish potato famines of the 1740s and the mid 19th centuries. Many drainage schemes also date to the end of World War I when many soldiers returned en masse to civilian life.

== Micro-history ==
The Lands and mansion house of Galrigs were renamed 'Newfield' circa 1723 by Captain Lawrence Nugent who had fought at the Battle of Neufeldt (Newfield) in Germany, however Galrigside Farm retained its ancient name. No link between the draining of the Galrig Loch and the 'New Field' therefore seems to exist. Lochside Farm is now only marked by its foundations although OS maps show it as still standing into the 1980s.

Views of the Galrigs Loch site

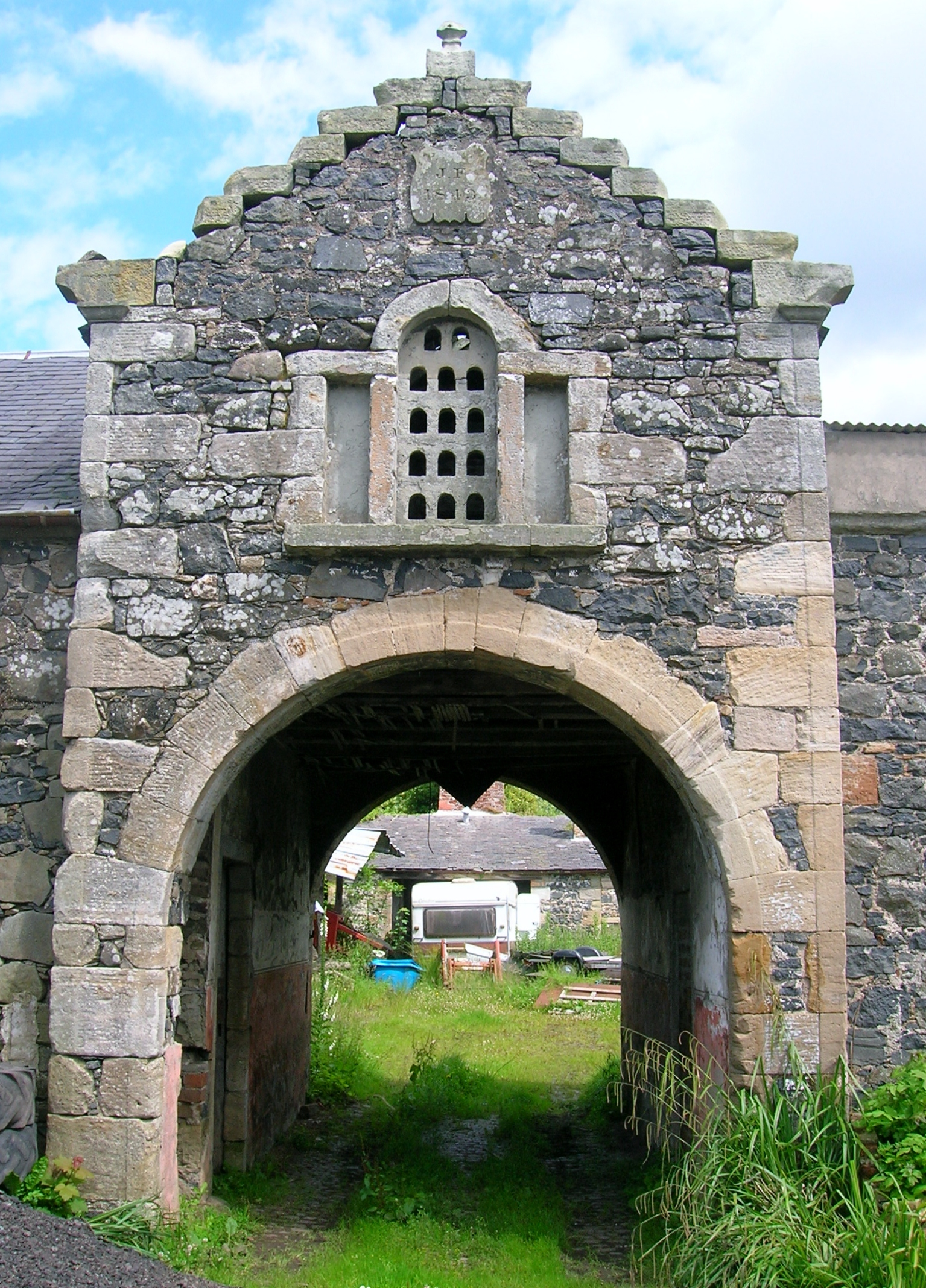
Pend and dovecot at Newfield Mains Farm.

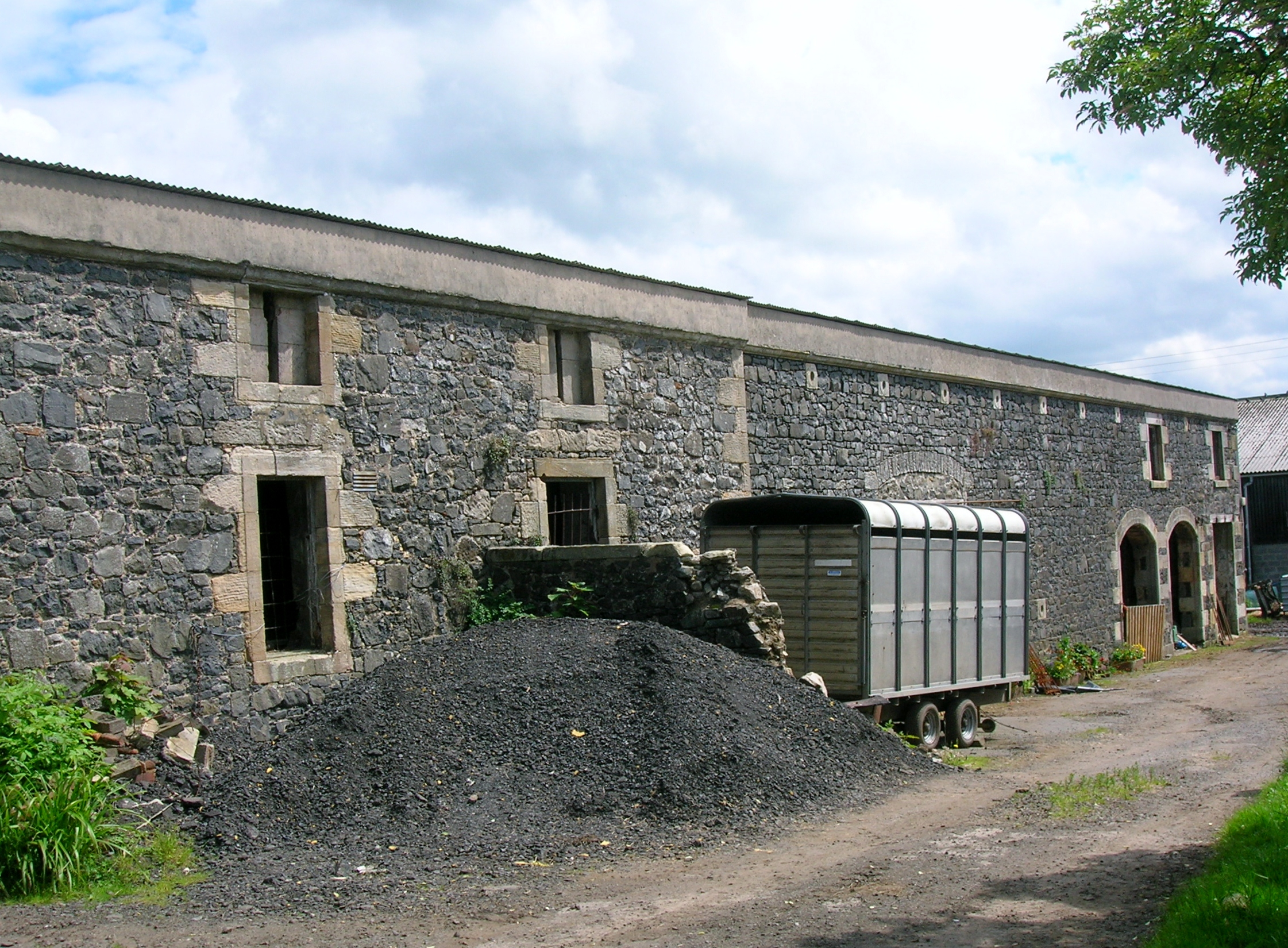
The south range of nearby Newfield Mains Farm.

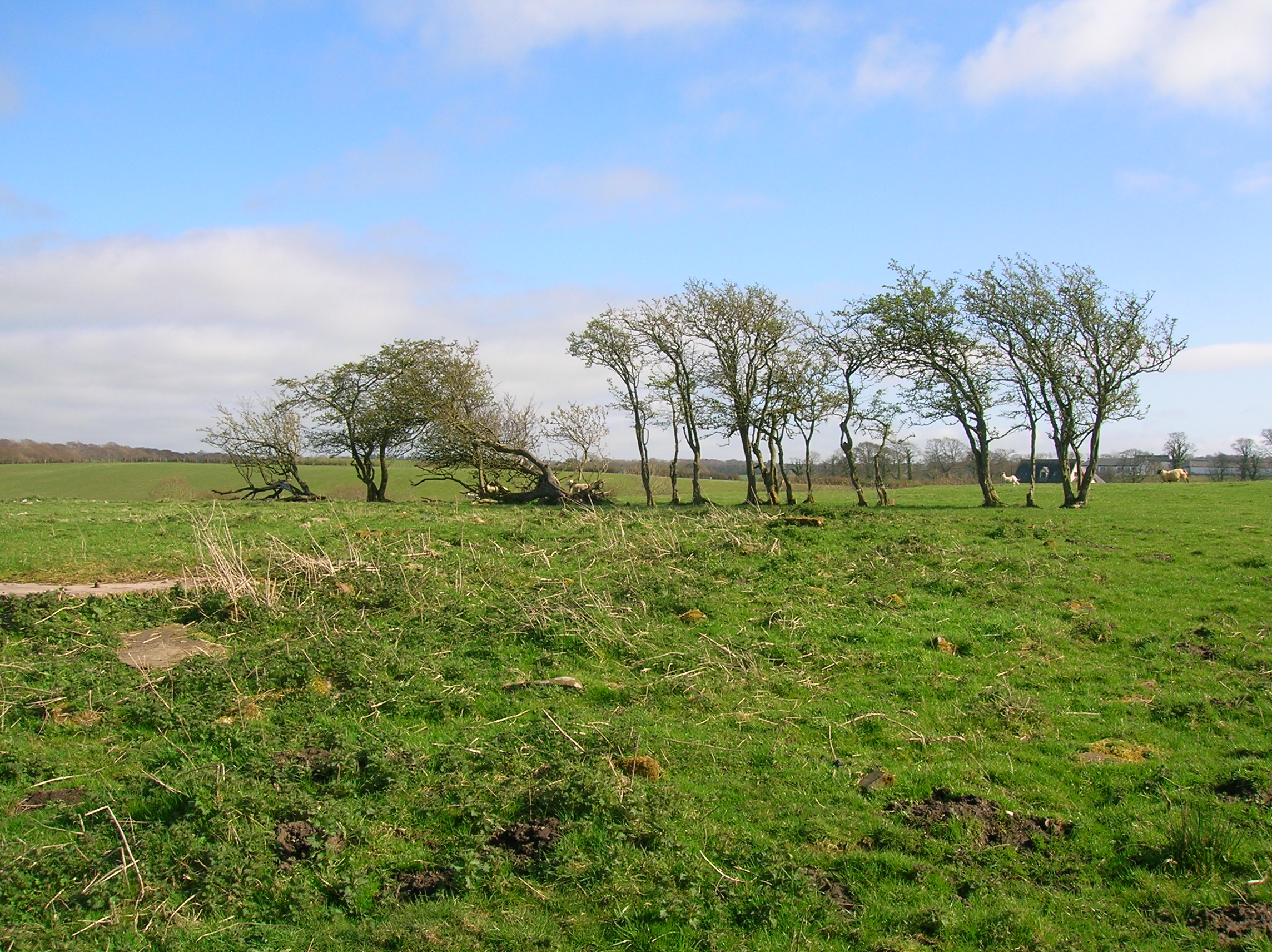
The site of Lochside Farm.

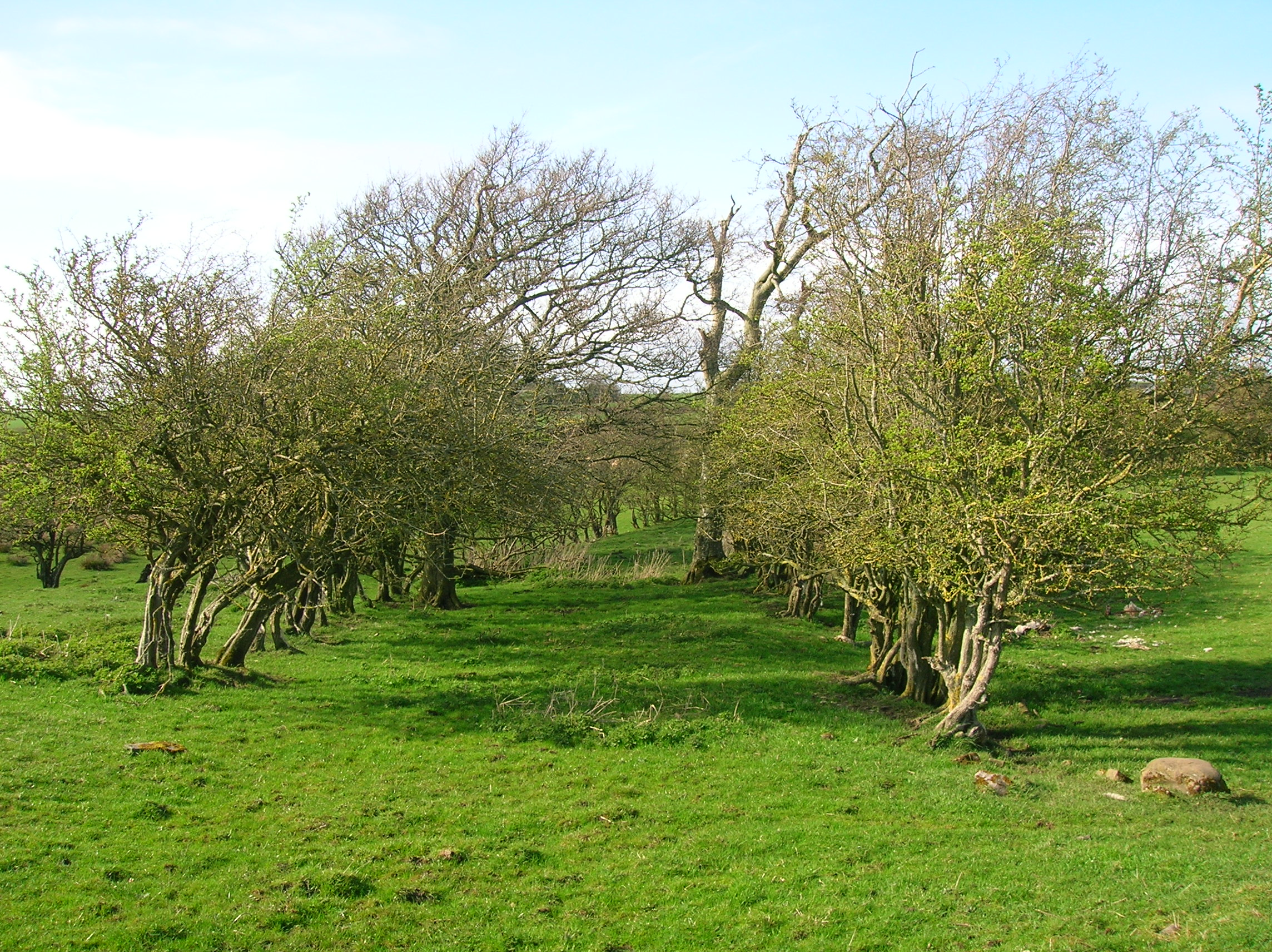
The old lane leading to Newfield Mains.

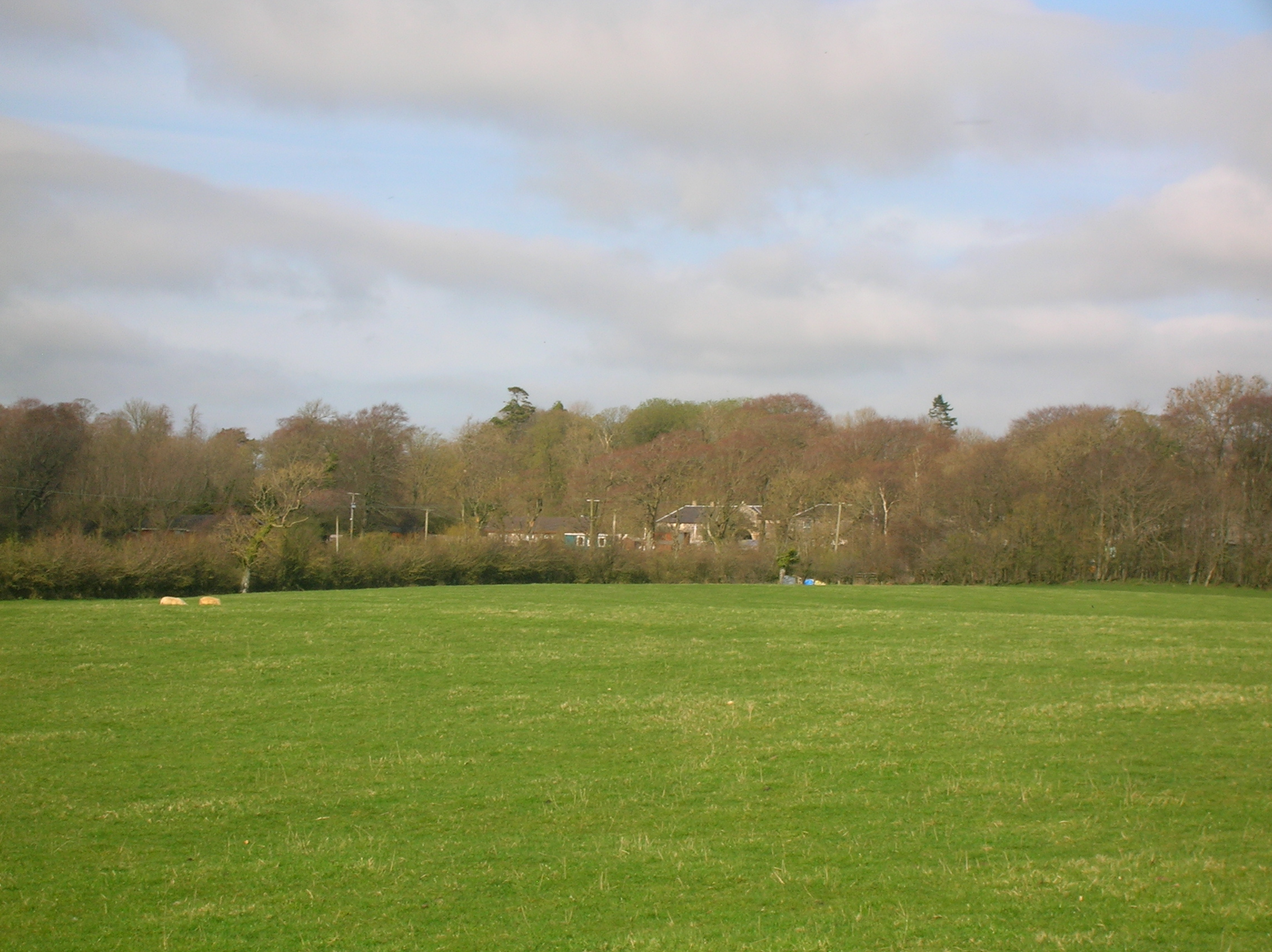
A view of Newfield Mains from the loch site.

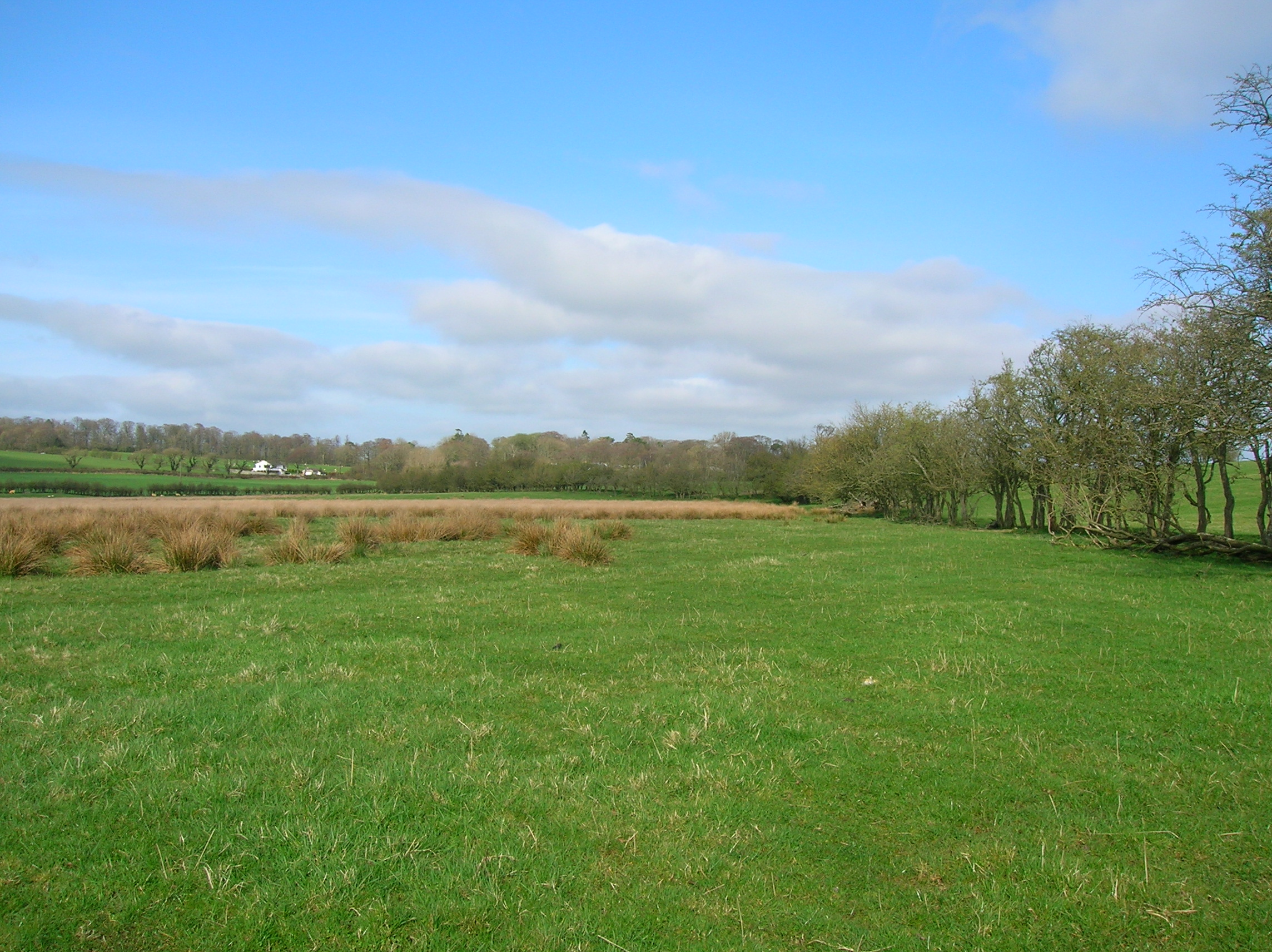
The eastern shoreline of the old loch.

== See also ==
- Caprington Loch
