= Lawthorn =

Coordinates: 55.6325°N 4.628°W

Lawthorn: Lethorn
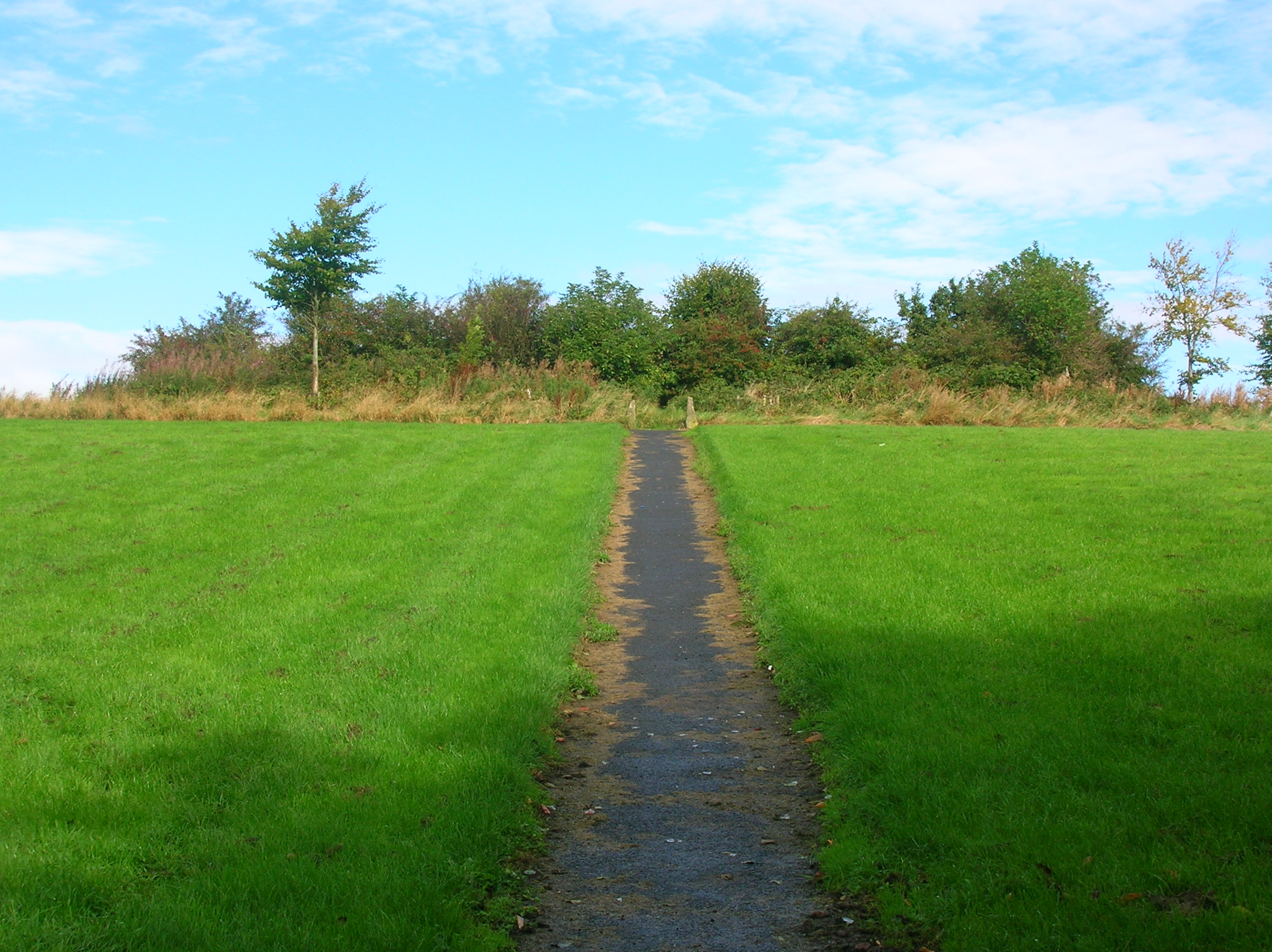
- Lawthorn Mount

- Location within North Ayrshire
- OS grid reference: NS346407
- Council area: North Ayrshire
- Lieutenancy area: Ayrshire and Arran
- Country: Scotland
- Sovereign state: United Kingdom
- Post town: Irvine
- Police: Scotland
- Fire: Scottish
- Ambulance: Scottish
- Scottish Parliament: Cunninghame North

Lawthorn is a hamlet near Perceton in Strathannick, Irvine, North Ayrshire, Scotland. The settlement lies on the old Irvine to Stewarton toll road.

== History ==
=== Lawthorn hamlet ===
The Annick Water flows between the village of Perceton and the hamlet of Lawthorn, however, the OS map shows that the hamlet was subsumed into the village of Perceton by 1895 and lost much of its identity. Lawthorn Cottage and Lawthornbank Smithy stood close to the Annick Water. Lawthorn cottage had a joiner's workshop with a John Highet as tenant in 1855–1857.

A toll house once stood near Lawthorn Cottage facing the bridge over the Annick Water; it became the property of the Earl of Eglinton after toll roads were abolished in the 1880s and local councils took over responsibility.

=== Barony of Stane ===
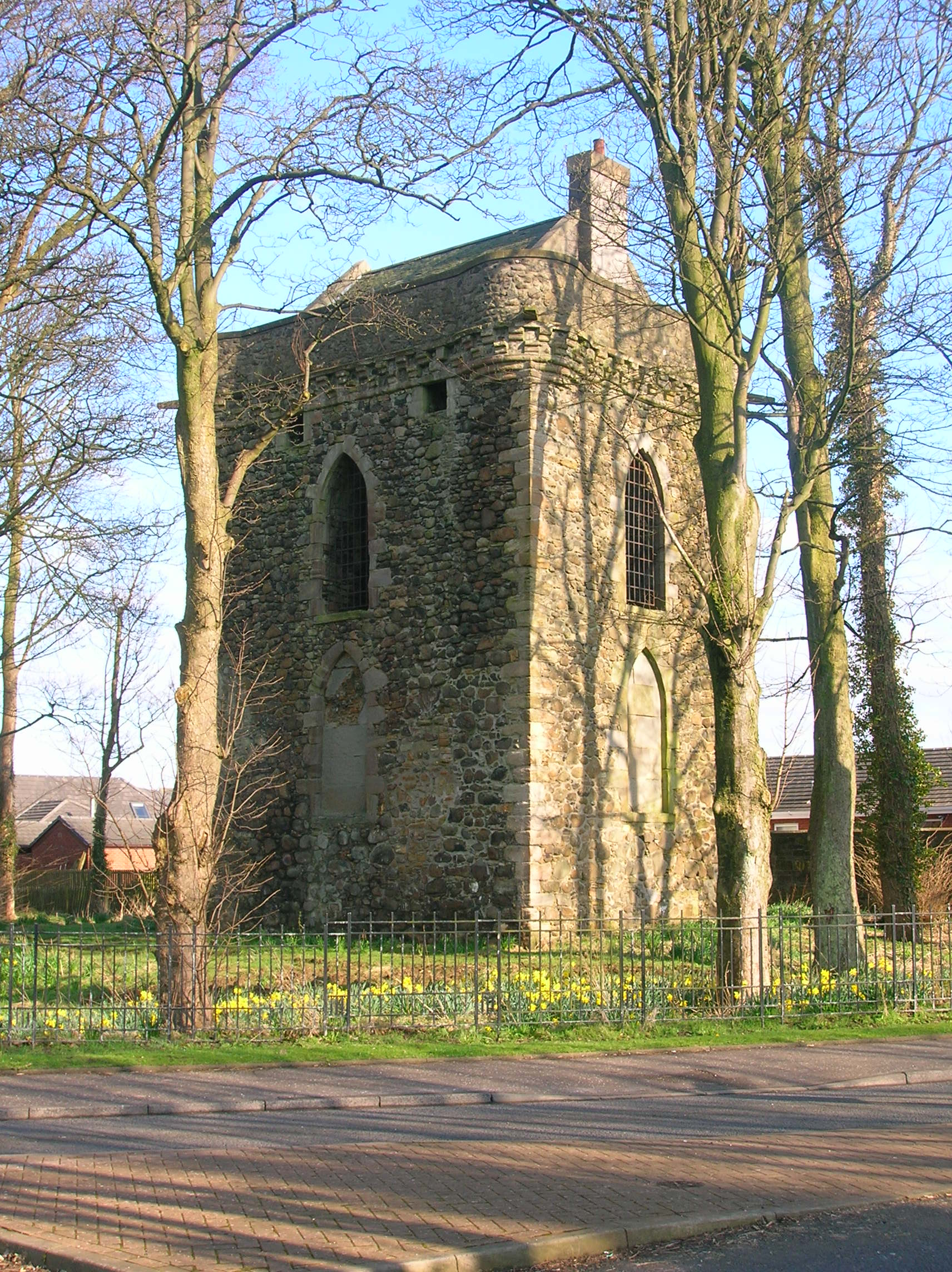
Stane Castle.

The lordship of Stonanrig or Stane extended to circa 300 acres and is first recorded as being held by "William Frawnces of le Stane" in 1417.

The Barony of Stane, St Bride's Kirk and Bourtreehill passed by marriage in 1508 of Elizabeth Francis, the sole heiress, to William Montgomery of Greenfield, third son of the 1st Earl of Eglinton. The present castle was built in 1520 by William Montgomery of Greenfield. The tower has been much altered with Gothic windows added when the building was altered to become a folly on the Eglinton Estate. The coat of arms of the Montgomery's of Stane and Greenfield were placed on the tower, being the same as those of Eglinton, but with 'proper distinction'. This may account for the coat of arms being thought to be upside down.

The foundations of the Stanecastle chapel were found a by Mr W Gray when digging drains. Judging from the foundations, the building must have been of considerable extent. The 1858 OS map marks the site of a nearby cemetery and an intriguing subterranean passage or vault four feet below the surface; nothing is visible at the site today. A small village once existed here and Stanecastle may have been the site of a nunnery before it became the home of the Francis family. In the 17th century the twenty shilling lands of old extent called Brydskirk are recorded, but with no mention of a chapel.

=== Etymology ===
The term 'Thorn' in Lawthorn may derive from 'torn, thorn, a tower', as in Jocks-Thorn on Cumbrae and in Kilmaurs, "alias Jock-Torn; and head, an eminence; hence tower-hill." 'Thorn' occurs in words meaning ‘assembly’, ‘meeting place’ and ‘piece of land' or ‘clearing’.

=== Lawthorn Mount ===
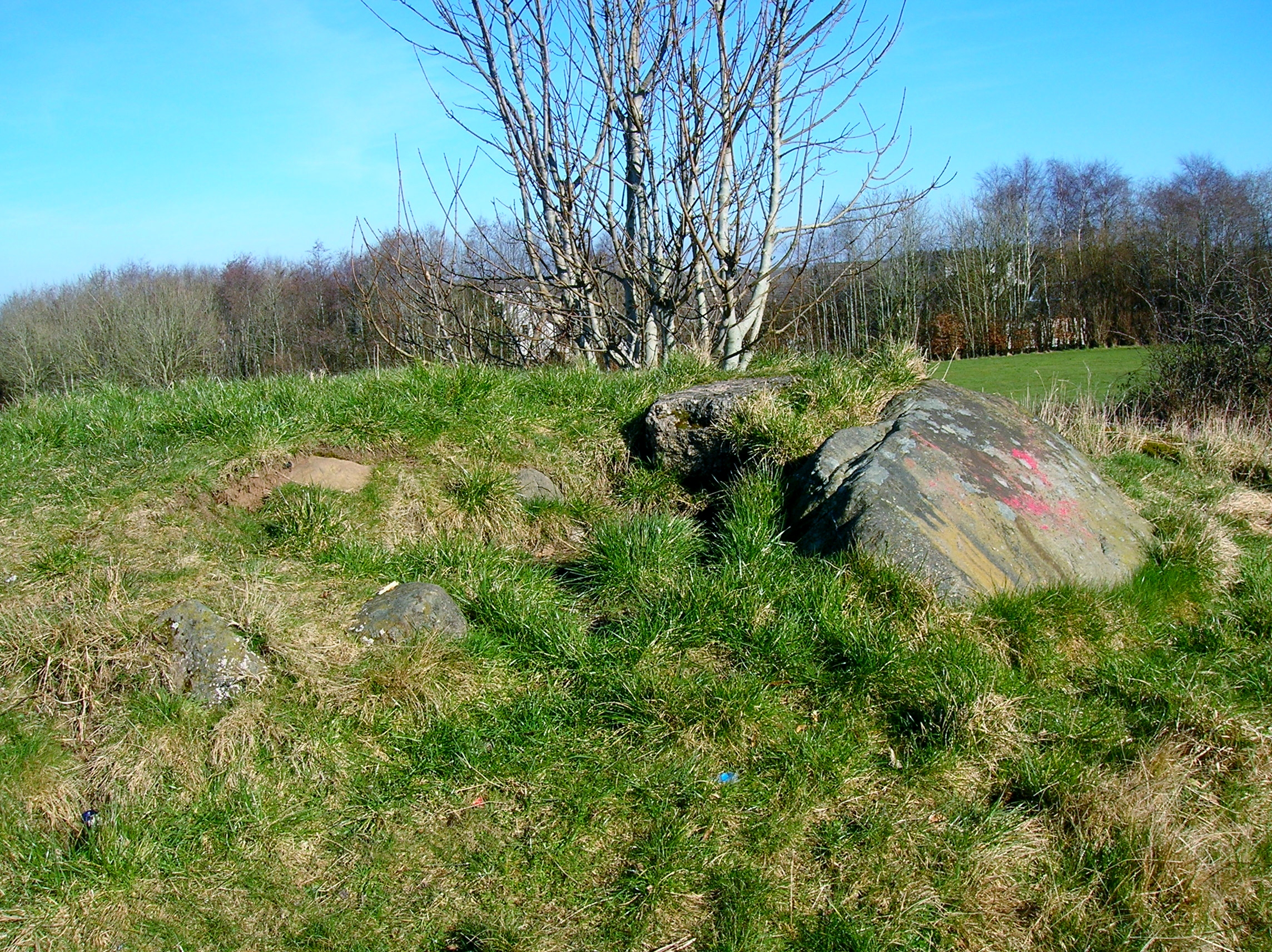
The barrow and the large greywacke stone.

Lawthorn Mount or 'The Thorn' is a scheduled monument classified as "Prehistoric ritual and funerary: mound, ritual or funerary" Regarded as a large and prehistoric cairn or barrow, a type of tumulus, a burial mound dating within the time period approximately 1300–700 BC, the Bronze Age. It is the highest point in the locality and its prominence is in keeping with barrows, cairns and other such burial sites.

The name 'Lawthorn' is suggestive of a secondary use as court hill or justice hill, which is the strong local oral tradition. The many 'Law Hills' in Scotland are considered to be ancient seats of justice where feudal justice was dispensed, investitures confirmed and other courts held before tolbooths were built. Stanecastle was the caput of the Barony of Stane and Lawthorn Mount may have been the location where the baronial court convened. No 'gallows' place-names are recorded for the vicinity however the Annick Water is nearby regarding judicial drownings of females as per the power of 'pit and gallows' then held by the laird or baron.

It measures 21 paces in diameter at the base, 14 feet (4.3 m) in diameter at the top and 9 feet 8 inches (2.95 m) high; is largely composed of boulders and one particularly large boulder of graywacke stone, 7 feet (2.1 m) long, is partially buried on the top edge facing south, above any possible kerb stones. The significance of this distinctive stone is unknown, however, the name 'stone' for the barony, the nearby place-names 'Stonemuir' and 'Lawthorn Mickle Stone' are suggestive a fallen or deliberately levelled standing stone. Given that the name 'William Frawnces de le Stane' is recorded from 1407 the place-name 'Stane' is unlikely to refer to the castle itself being built of stone to replace an earlier wooden one. An unofficial dig in the 20th century revealed no finds such as graves, etc.

Lawthorn Mount has also have been as the possible site of an early castle constructed from wood although no physical evidence has been found as yet to corroborate this. This much disturbed mound is clearly artificial and its size has been confused by a surrounding protective bank suggestive of a roundel created as part of landscaping works.

A Cairnmount Plantation is located nearby to the north and a modern Cairnmount has been built on an artificial mound at Sourlie in Eglinton Country Park.

==== Girdle Mount ====
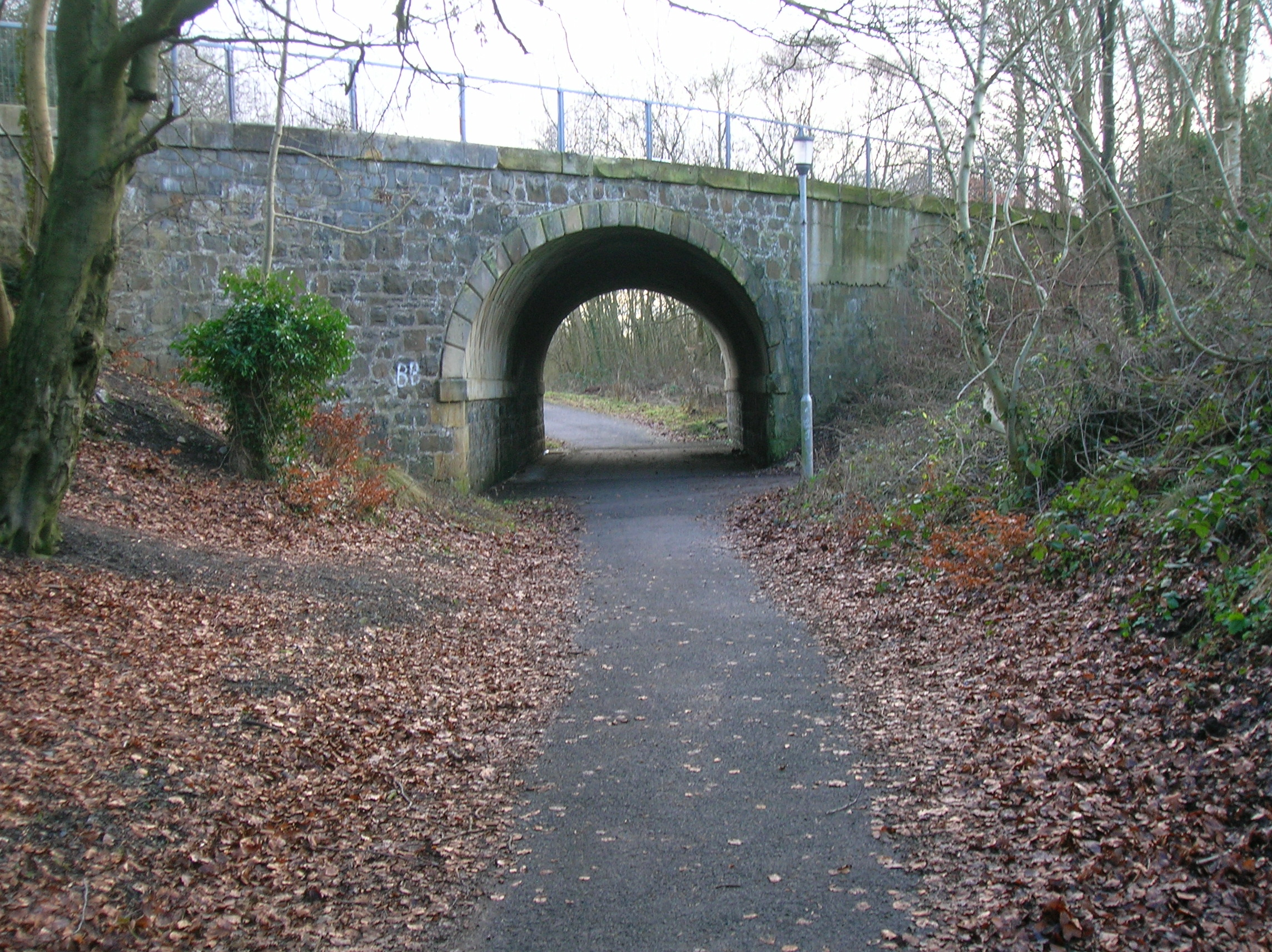
Old road bridge and railway trackbed near Lawthorn Primary School

Another well preserved mound stood nearby at Girdle Toll however it was demolished in 1852. This mound was circa 30 feet in diameter and around 3 feet high. A turf dyke also surrounded it and this was surmounted by a thorn hedge. In the vicinity were a number of trees, mainly beech.

=== Coal mining ===
In the census of 1820 there were five households with colliers at Lawthorn. The Glasgow and South Western Railway (Perceton Branch) ran from north to south through the area passing close to Littlestane. This was purely a standard gauge mineral line used to transport coal from the nearby collieries. Sections of the route are now used by pedestrians and cyclists.

=== Lawthorn Wood ===
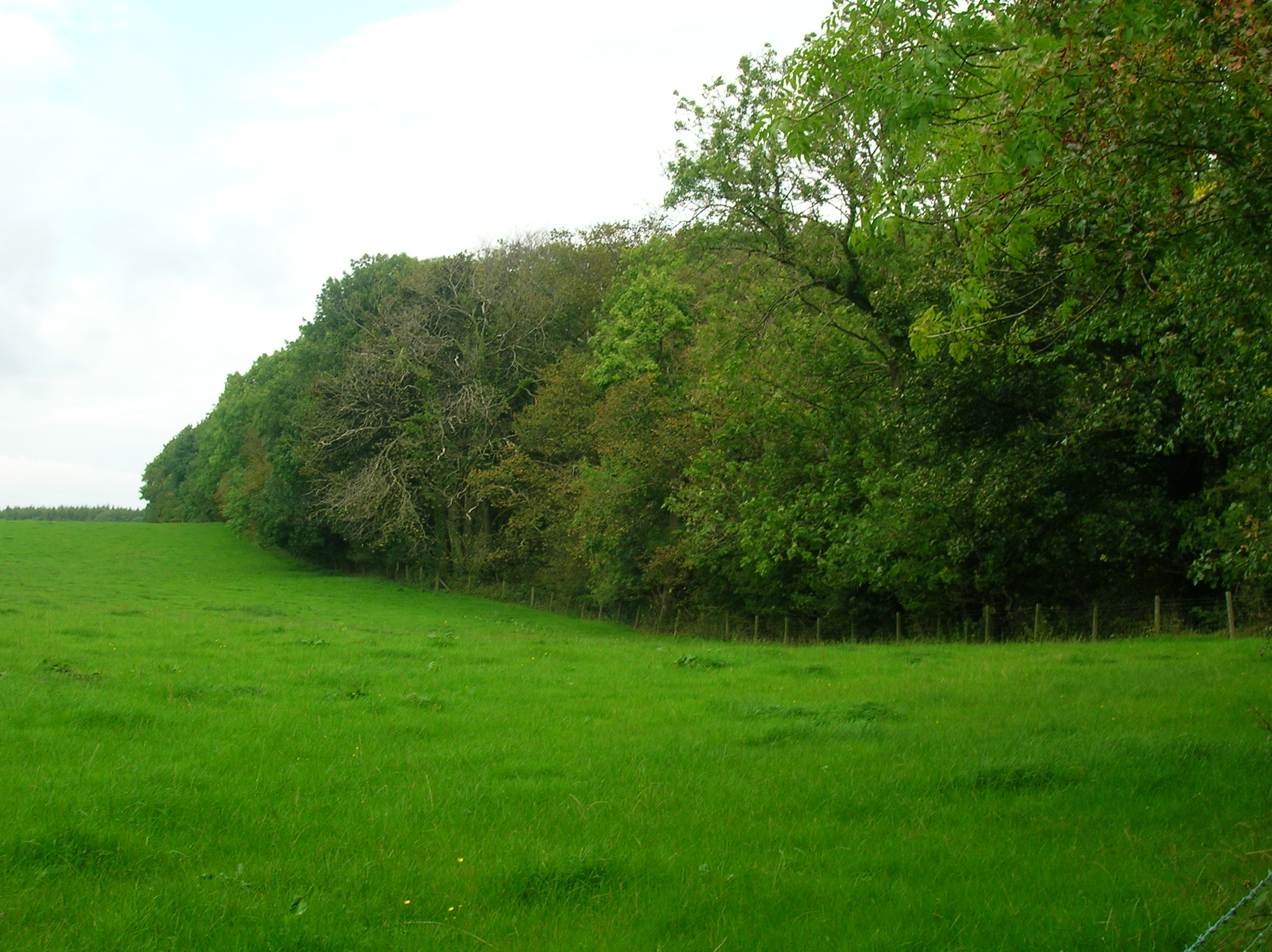
The western edge of Lawthorn Wood Nature Reserve

This woodland is a Scottish Wildlife Trust nature reserve and is a small, mature deciduous woodland. The tall canopy is now dominated by ash trees, with some beech and sycamore. The elm trees that were once common have died through Dutch elm disease however they have been left and their trunks encourage fungus growth and also provide nesting sites for bats and birds, including great spotted woodpecker. Standing water in a hollow adds to the species diversity of the site, including a locally uncommon plant, the water figwort.

The shape of the woodland boundary suggests that approximately half of the main wood was felled prior to 1856. In 1826 the wood ran down to the road and extended southwards as far as Stanecastle. Parts of this wood survive with a number of old trees, running as far as the main road and bordering Lawthorn Primary School.

=== The Farms of Lawthorn ===
Lawthorn Farm itself stands close to Lawthorn Mount. In 1855-57 it was described as a good farm steading with outer buildings used as offices and the tenant under the Earl of Eglinton was a James Dunlop.

Littlestone or Littlestane Farm stood on a lane off the western side of the nearby road and is shown as such in 1856.

A Stone Farm once stood opposite Lawthorn Wood and is recalled by inference in the names 'Littlestane' and the old Littlestane Loch. William Roy's map published in 1752-55 shows Stone Farm lying in between Lawthorn Farm and Littlestone Farm with several buildings and hedged enclosures approached by a lane branching off the road to Stanecastle. Stone Farm is still shown in 1826 but is not indicated on the 1856 OS map The site of the old Stane Farm is today marked by rubble, a building platform, field boundaries and the line of an entrance lane.

Two likely farms are recorded, one as 'Lawthorn Mickle Stone' in John Thomson's 1828 Atlas of Scotland, published in 1832. One may be 'Lawthorn' and the other 'Stane' The use of the name 'mickle' in farming usually refers to the larger of the two farms made up of unequal portions of an older area of land following the agricultural reconstruction of the 18th century as was the case on the Eglinton Estates as introduced by Alexander Montgomerie, 10th Earl of Eglinton.

== See also ==
- Cairnduff - A Bronze Age cairn near Stewarton, East Ayrshire.
