= Cochrane Castle =

Castle in Renfrewshire, Scotland

Coordinates: 55.8214°N 4.5267°W

Cochrane Castle was a castle, 1 mile (1.6 km) west of Johnstone, Renfrewshire, Scotland, near the Black Cart Water.

== History ==
The property was owned by the Cochranes in the 14th century; the family being elevated to Baron Cochrane of Dundonald in 1647, and Earl of Dundonald in 1669. It was purchased by the Johnstones of Cochrane around 1760.

A monument to commemorate the castle was built in 1896. It is a small corbiestepped tower, and incorporates a stone with the date 1592 and the Cochrane arms.

== Structure ==
There are no remains at the site. There IS a section of the original castle still standing ! It can be viewed in Google Maps Street View - Now labelled as Johnstone Castle on Tower Road. Opposite 8 Tower Road.

== See also ==
- Castles in Great Britain and Ireland
- List of castles in Scotland
