= Clan Cochrane =

Lowland Scottish clan

- Crest: A horse passant Argent
- Motto: Virtute Et Labore (By valour and exertion)

Profile
- Region: Lowlands
- District: Renfrewshire
- Animal: Boar

Chief
- The Rt. Hon. Iain Cochrane, 15th Earl of Dundonald
- The 15th Earl of Dundonald
- Seat: Lochnell Castle
- Historic seat: Auchindoun Castle

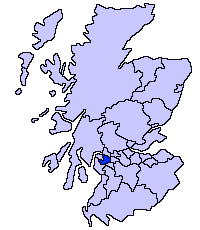
Map of Scotland showing the district of Renfrewshire, where the Cochranes lived

Clan Cochrane is a Scottish clan of the Scottish Lowlands.

== History ==
=== Origins ===
Traditionally the original ancestor of the Clan Cochrane in Scotland was a Scandinavian Viking who settled in what is now known as Renfrewshire, between the eighth and tenth centuries. It is evident that the name is of territorial origin, derived from the lands of Cochrane near Paisley. The origin of the name itself is believed to be derived from two Gaelic words which jointly mean The Roar of the Battle or Battle Cry. The Cochranes took the boar as their heraldic beast, in keeping with the character of their traditional ancestor. The three boar's heads adorning the chief's shield are said to represent the exploits of a warrior who killed three of the beasts who were terrorizing the countryside.

Another traditional origin of the name Cochrane is that it comes from when an early member of the family fought in battle with such bravery that his leader singled him out from the others and clapped him on the shoulder calling him coch ran which means brave fellow.

The first record of the name occurs in 1262, when a certain Waldeve de Coueran witnessed a charter concerning a transfer of lands between Dubhghall Mac Suibhne and Walter Stewart, Earl of Menteith.

Other early bearers of the name are William de Coughran in 1296, who signed submission to King Edward the First in the Ragman Roll; and Robert de Cochrane in about 1360. The name of 1296 appears in the Ragman Rolls swearing fealty to Edward I of England.

=== 14th, 15th and 16th centuries ===
In 1346 John de Coveran appears as a witness in the election of an Abbot of Paisley. Goseline de Cochran appears as a witness to several grants made by Robert the Steward to Paisley Abbey in 1366.

Robert Cochrane (later to become an Earl of Mar (1458–79) constructed most of what is still standing of Auchindoun Castle. It was passed to the Clan Ogilvy in 1489 and from them to the Clan Gordon in 1535.

In 1456 Robert Cochrane of Cochrane resigned the lands of Cochrane to his successor Allen Cochrane who received a charter from King James II of Scotland. Edward Cochrane was accused but cleared of having anything to do with the detention of King James III of Scotland at Edinburgh Castle in 1482.

In 1556 William Cochrane, chief of Clan Cochrane obtained a charter of confirmation for the lands of Cochrane from Mary, Queen of Scots.

In 1584 chief William Cochrane, along with several others, was charged with being involved in the murder of Patrick Maxwell, but Cochrane was never brought to trial.

In 1592 the Clan MacKintosh sacked Auchindoun Castle, which had been built by Clan Cochrane but which at the time belonged to the 6th Earl of Huntly, George Gordon, in retaliation for his killing of their ally, the Bonny Earl of Moray. Also in 1592 chief William Cochrane built a high free stone tower, known as Cochrane Tower or Cochrane Castle.

=== 17th century and Civil War ===
In about 1350 Robert II of Scotland had built Dundonald Castle in Ayrshire. The castle came into Cochrane hands in about 1638 and it was from there that William Cochrane, 1st Earl of Dundonald took his title.

During the Civil War of the 17th century the Clan Cochrane supported the royalist cause. Throughout the war clansman Sir John Cochrane travelled extensively abroad as the king's representative. The chief 'Lord Cochrane' fought in the royalist army at the Battle of Preston (1648).

In 1669 the Cochrane chief's title was raised from a Lord to an Earl when Sir William Cochrane was created 1st Earl of Dundonald. After the death of the 7th Earl, the descendants of Sir William's second son became the Earls.

=== 18th century and Jacobite risings ===
During the Jacobite rising of 1745 the main part of Clan Cochrane supported the British government and in the government army under General Sir John Cope there were two Cochrane officers; Captain John Cochrane and Captain Basil Cochrane, both were clansmen related to the chief, Earl of Dundonald. Both were taken prisoner at the Battle of Prestonpans in 1745. However, on the Jacobite side William Cochrane of Ferguslie shared in the victory. In October 1745 the seventh Earl of Dundonald had his horse shot from underneath him by Jacobites at the West Port, Edinburgh.

Later throughout the eighteenth and nineteenth centuries the Cochranes distinguished themselves in both land and naval forces, and came to be nicknamed the "Fighting Cochranes."

The Cochranes are known to have played an important role during the Napoleonic Wars. The most noteworthy of these fighting Cochranes was Thomas Cochrane, 10th Earl of Dundonald (1775–1860) who joined the Royal Navy at the age of 18. The high point of his career was when a brig under his command with a crew of only fifty-four managed to capture a Spanish frigate with a crew of over three hundred sailors and 32 heavy guns. He followed this by defending Trinidad Castle against the French in 1808. He later became the commander of Chile's navy and assisted that country, along with Peru, Brazil and Greece, to become independent. He was known as Lord Cochrane. He is buried at Westminster Abbey in Westminster, London.

=== 20th century ===
The father of the present chief, who was the fourteenth Earl served with the Black Watch, then during World War Two, he served in North Africa, Sicily, Italy and Greece. When the war ended, he served with the War Office and in Germany until he retired in 1953. Sir Ralph Cochrane the youngest son of Thomas Cochrane, 1st Baron Cochrane of Cults, was a British pilot and Royal Air Force officer, perhaps best known for his role in Operation Chastise–the famous "Dambusters" raid.

== Clan chief ==
The chief of the Name and Arms of Cochrane is Iain Alexander Douglas Blair Cochrane, 15th Earl of Dundonald, 10th Baron Cochrane of Dundonald as well as 10th Baron of Paisley and Ochiltree.

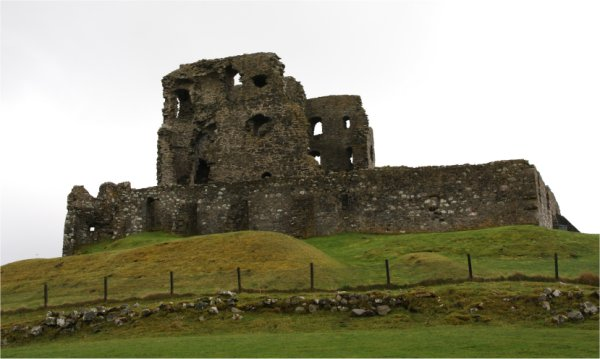
Auchindoun Castle

== Clan castles ==
Castles that have belonged to the Cochranes have included:

- Cochrane Castle.
- Auchindoun Castle.
- Johnstone Castle.
- Dundonald Castle.
- Lochnell Castle.

== See also ==
- Cochrane (surname)
- Robert Cochrane (favourite)
