= Auchans Castle, Ayrshire =

Castle in South Ayrshire, Scotland

Auchans Castle
- Craigie, South Ayrshire, Scotland; UK grid reference NS3548034599
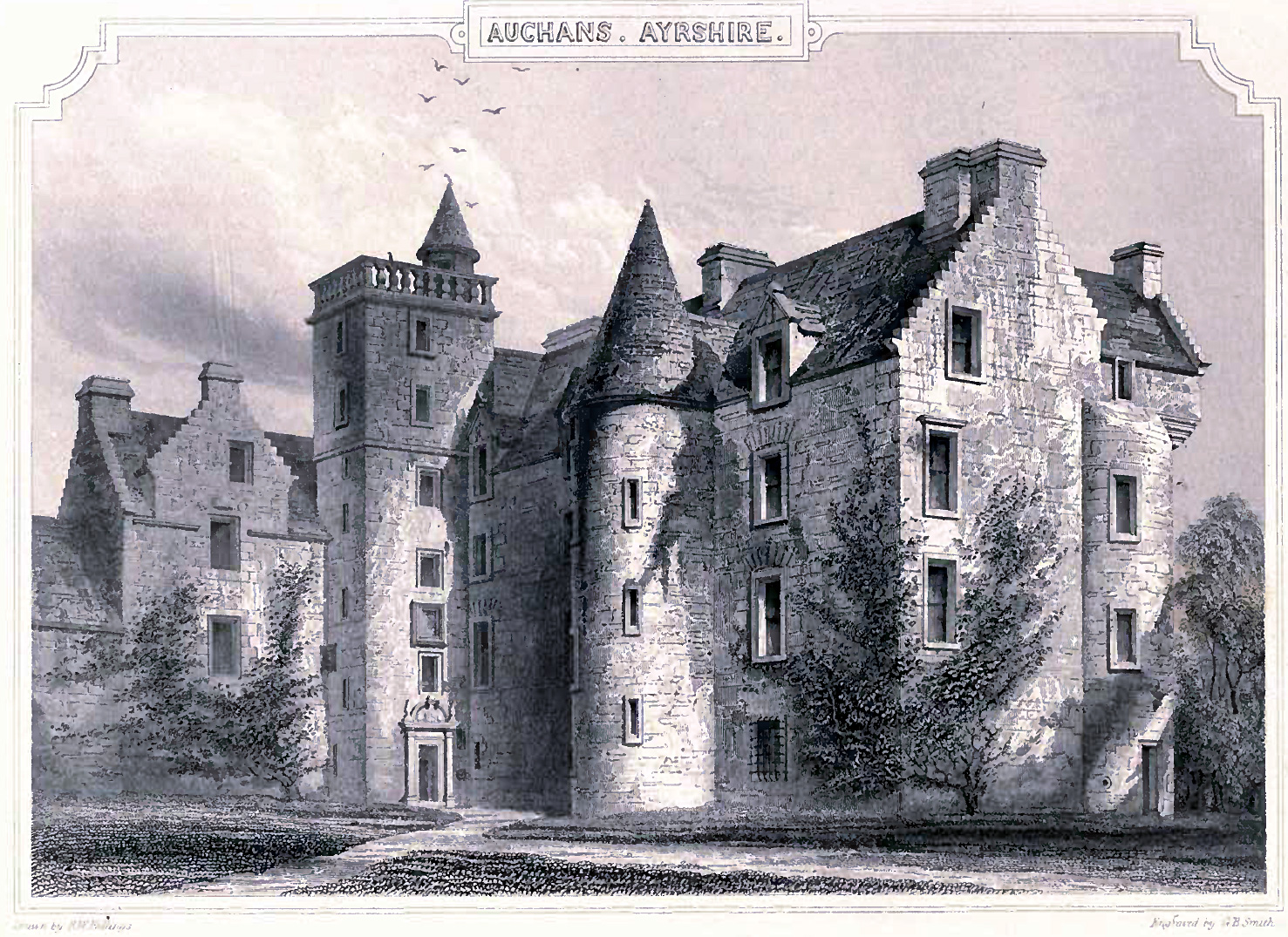
- Auchans in the 19th century

Site information
- Type: Mock military mansion
- Owner: Mr R Vernon, Hillhouse
- Controlled by: Montgomery clan Wallace Clan Cochrane Clan
- Open to the public: Private
- Condition: Ruin

Location
- Shown within Scotland
- Coordinates: 55.577185°N 4.611292°W

Site history
- Built: 16th century
- Built by: Sir William Cochrane
- In use: Until 19th century
- Materials: Whinstone and freestone

Auchans Castle, House, House of Auchans or Old Auchans, is a mock military mansion, Category A listed, T-plan building of a late 16th-century date converted to the L-plan during the early-to-mid-17th century; its ruins stand about 1 km W of Dundonald, South Ayrshire, Scotland. Parish of Dundonald. It was held at various times by the Wallace, Cochrane and Montgomerie families.

== Description ==
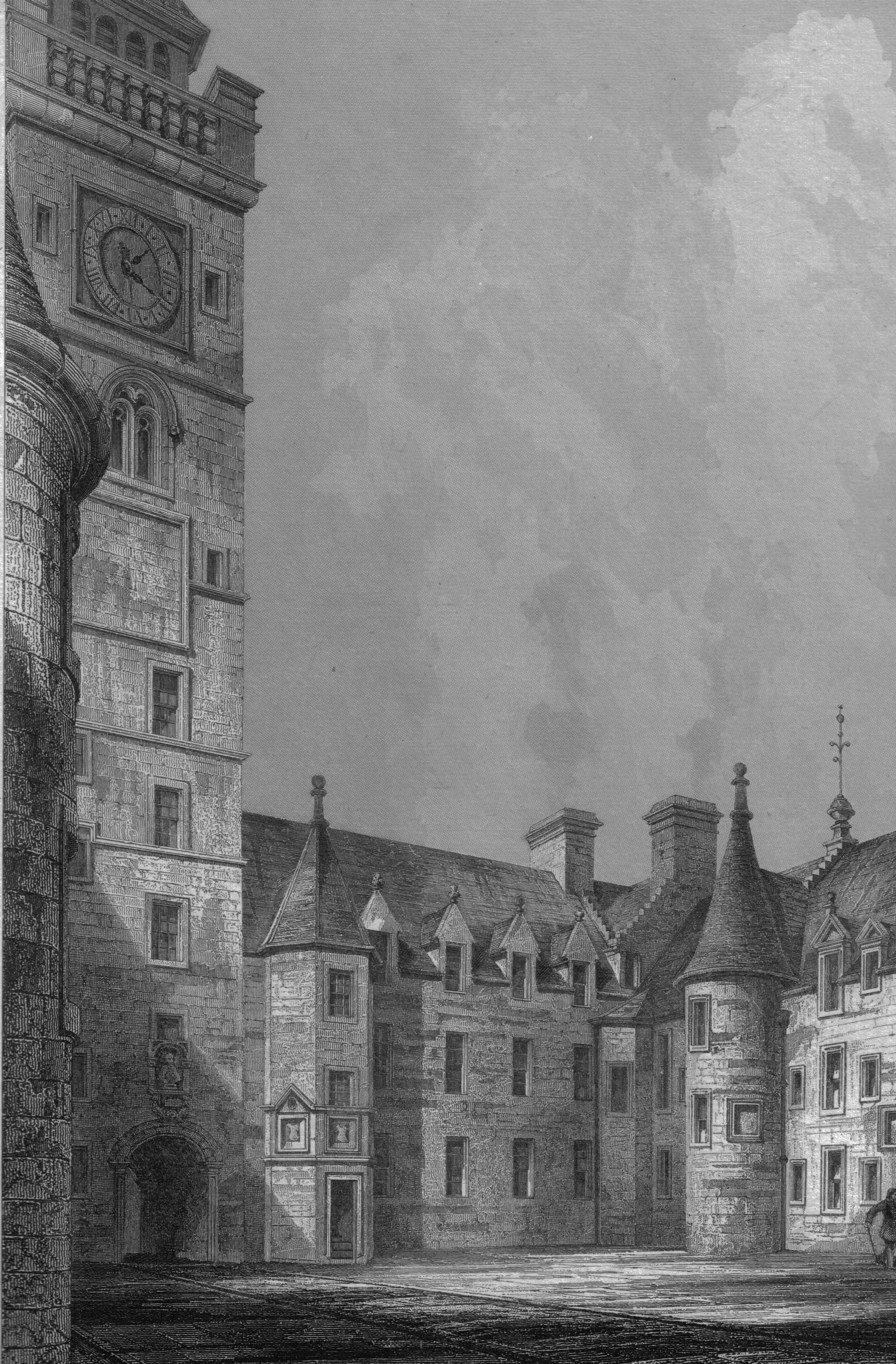
A view of Glasgow's old university buildings

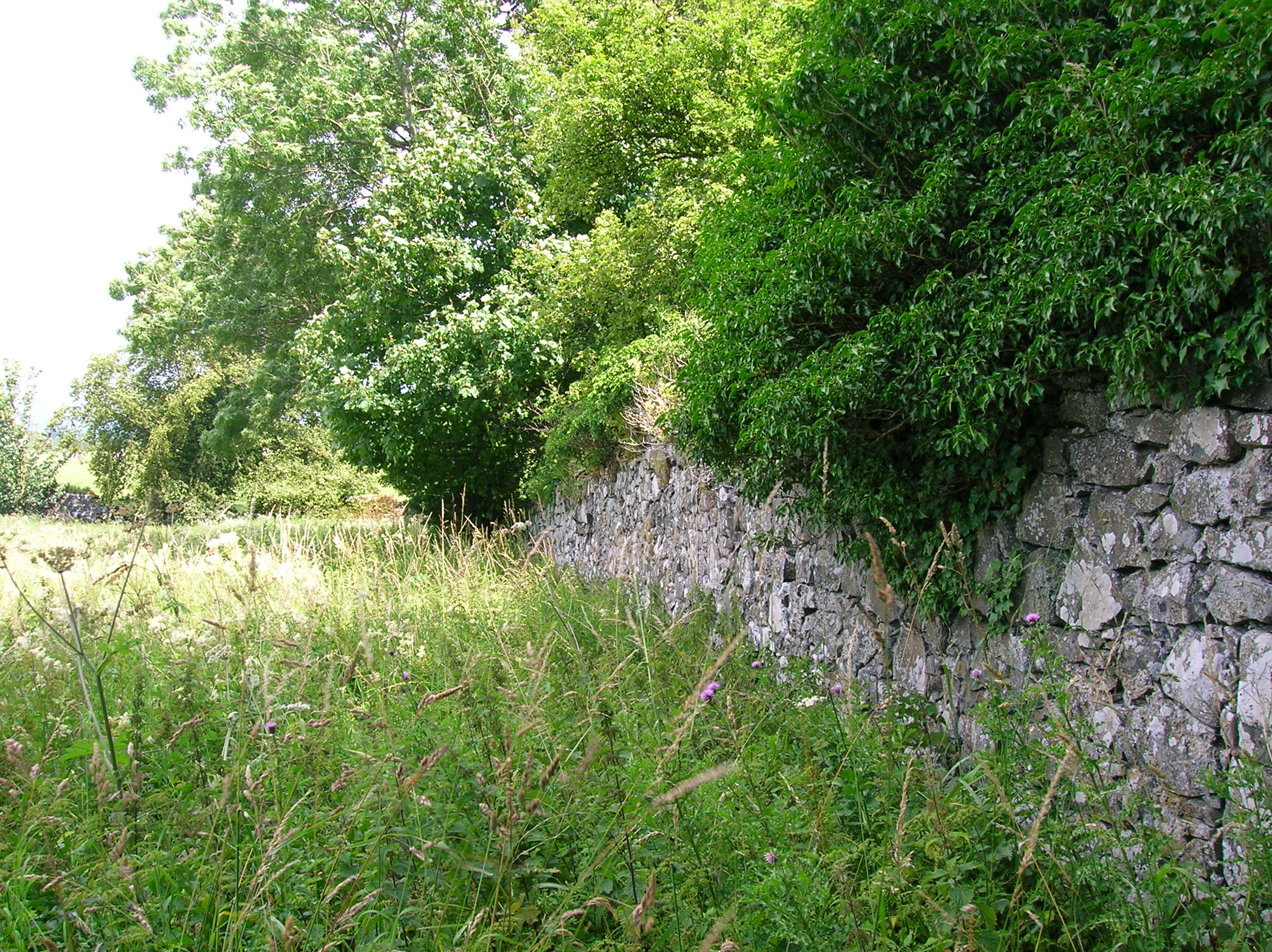
The walled garden

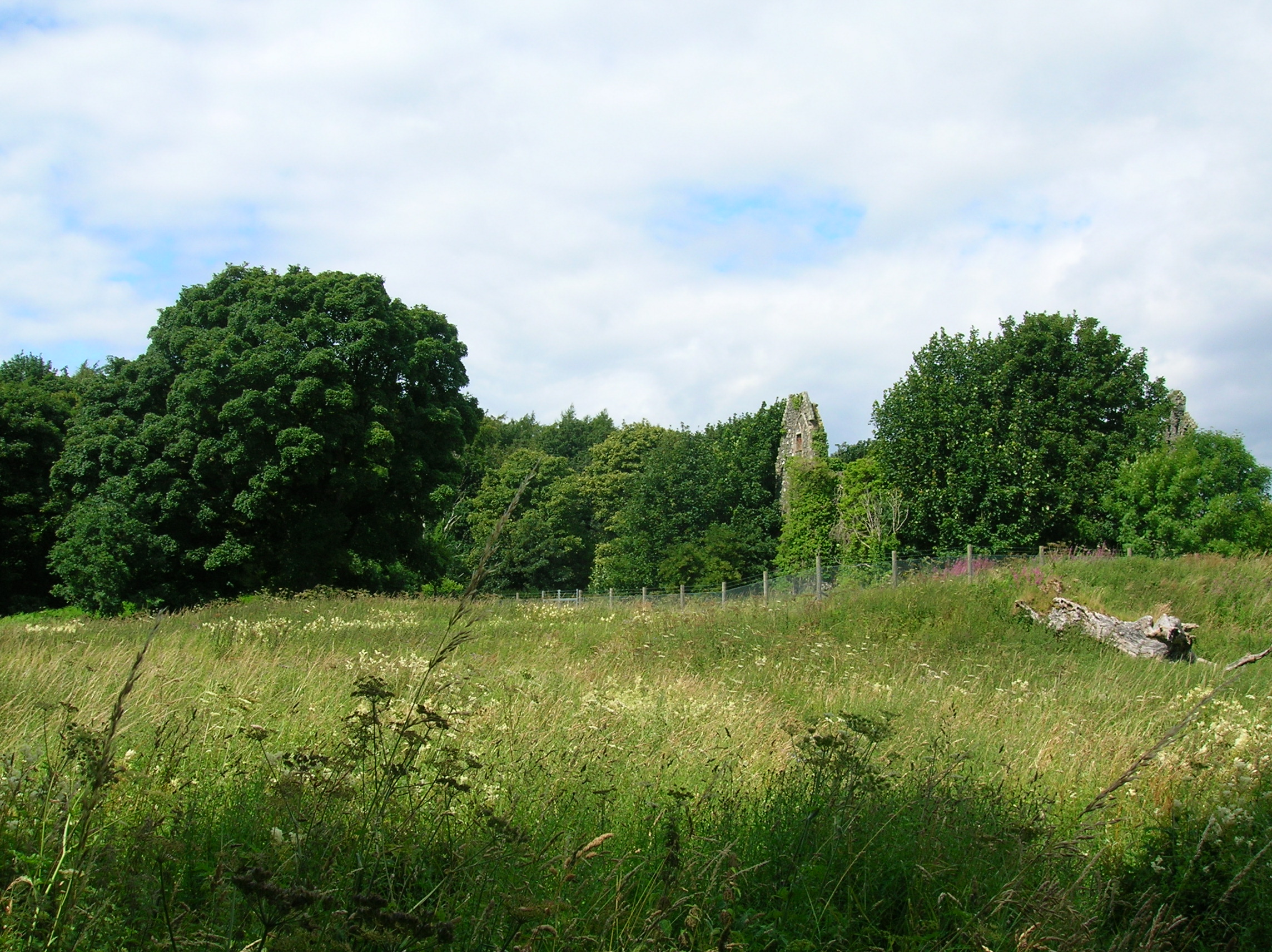
The view of the castle and old flower garden area from the walled garden.

McKean refers to Auchans as being amongst Scotland's principal châteaux which he defines as the dwelling of the owner of a great property, a large and beautiful pleasure house in the countryside, and records that James Wallace added the fashionable square stair-tower in the re-entrant angle, with its viewing platform and broken pediments in 1644. The spelling on Joan Blaeu's map of 1654 is 'Aghans'.

The castle stands on a slightly elevated knoll and is constructed mainly of whinstone. Cummell recorded in the 18th century that the building reminded him of the old Glasgow College buildings. The original house, with its high gables, had three principal storeys; the basement was vaulted and a stair-tower was situated externally, central to the South side. The balustraded terrace on the South side of castle was at one time enclosed within a courtyard. A new wing, three storeys and a garret in height, was at a later date added at the West end of the North wall, and a stair-tower, with a Renaissance-style doorway, was built, still visible in the present ruins. This new wing was extended still further on the North by the addition of a block with two towers. The basement of the block was vaulted; one of the towers was corbelled, square in section and its gables crow-stepped. Domestic buildings were added on the South and East sides of the courtyard.

The kitchen stood in the western wing; the first floor contained a suite of principal rooms, that in the western wing being known as the dining room in the 1860s, probably originally being the private room and bedroom of the proprietor. It was wood panelled and had an ornate marble fireplace. The second floor contained bedrooms and the third floor, partly in the roof, was chiefly occupied by a long gallery. This was lit by dormer windows and by a large traceried window in the east gable, long built up. The entrance was in the square balustraded tower and was of the Renaissance style. The main block of the castle was not vaulted and only the cellars in the North wing had vaults. Only a few gun-loops were provided as by 1644 such defensive structures were largely redundant.

One of the 'side angles' in 1876 carried a date stone engraved with the year '1644' and another carried the date '1667'. Likely marriage stones carried the initials that relate to Sir William Cochrane and his wife Eupheme Scott.

W C
D
E S

The now greatly ruined castle stands in its woodland policies amidst a series of stone-walled parks, the walls of which are mainly in a state of collapse. The building and the park walls were in the main constructed using stone robbed from Dundonald Castle. A vast number of valuable Eglinton family papers were discovered in one of the apartments in the 1880s, rescued as the building was in a terminal state of decay. Many had already been destroyed through neglect.

=== The Auchans pear, gardens and policies ===
MacGibbon & Ross record that flower gardens stood to the side of the property within a walled garden. In 1875 this garden was still under cultivation and in the orchard had stood the parent tree of the famous Auchans pear, the first of its kind in the county, brought in from France (or Norway) at an early date, said to be during the reign of Mary, Queen of Scots. This tree had grown to a great height and was blown down in 1793. In 2003 a sample of pears from Pluscarden Abbey near Elgin were sent for identification and were found to be the Black Aachen or Auchans pear. Hogg's Fruit Manual also records them as growing in Cheshire.

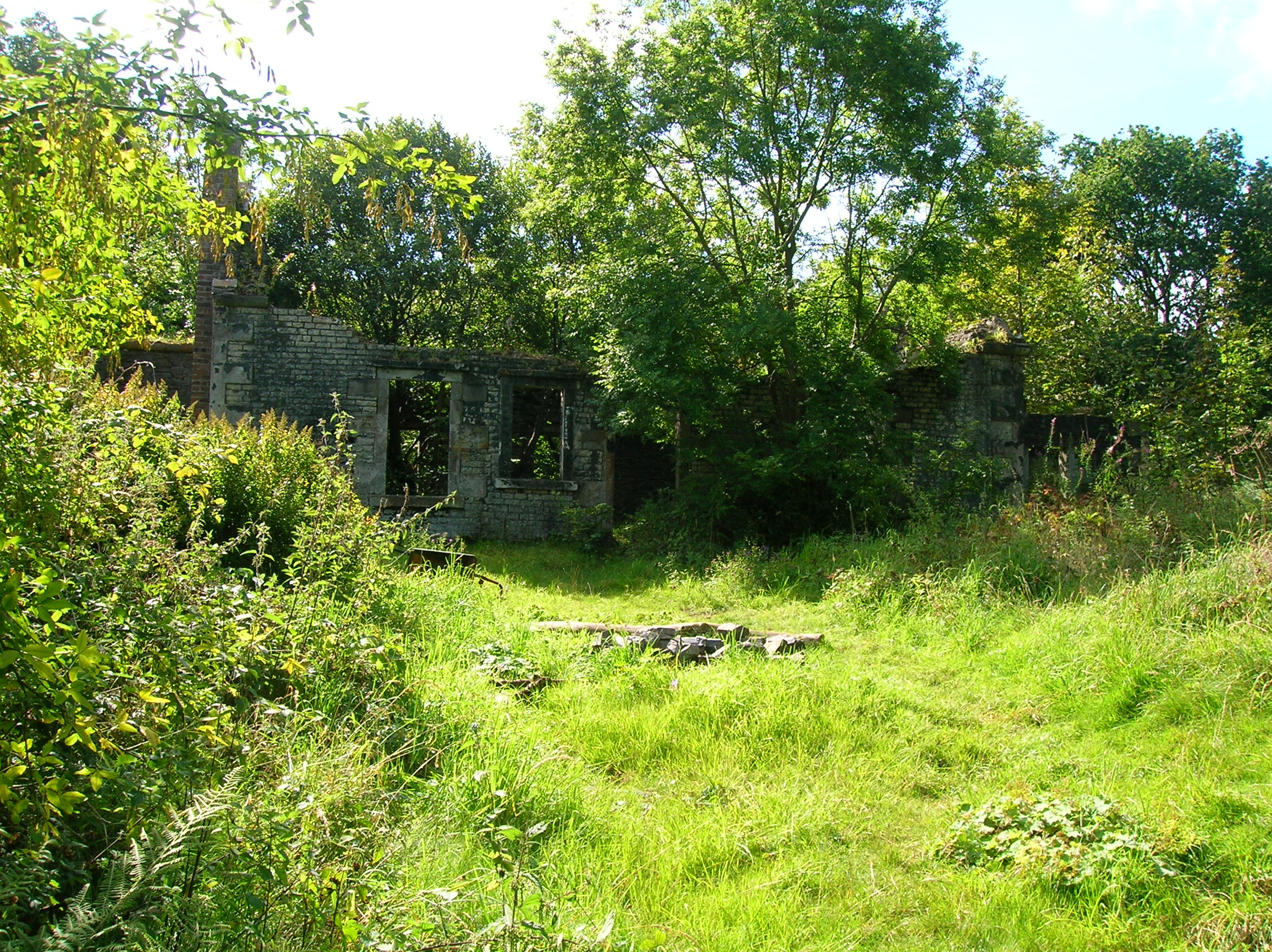
The ruins of old Parkthorn House

The Auchans pear may have taken its name from the castle as the proper name, 'The Toadback Pear', had dropped out of usage. It is a lumpy russet, showing great health and vigour and the fruit is described as being as "ugly as a toad". Other varieties are Red Auchan and Winter Achan. The flesh is described as tender, buttery, juicy, sugary, with a rich and aromatic flavour. Auchans are Scotch dessert pears of first-rate quality; ripe in November and December. As stated, the tree is a very abundant and regular bearer, particularly when it has acquired age. The Auchans pear spread all over Scotland as shown by the Pluscarden Abbey survival.

An artificial loch was situated within the policies, well stocked with fish. The Old Bank is the name given to the tree-covered hillside to the west, bordering the old deer park. An area known as Kemp Law is associated with the site of a vitrified fort and the Badger Brae that lies nearby. The mid-19th century OS maps show a complex of out-buildings and a dwelling called Old Auchans, situated above the castle and with Parkthorn farm nearby; it had views of what is now the quarry. The Old Auchans property is now ruinous; it may have been the dwelling of the estate factors before New Auchans House, now demolished, was built.

=== The Deer Park and Rabbit Warren ===
A deer park was present in the 1820s as shown by Thomson's map. Opposite Dundonald Castle is a high and precipitous bank, wooded, which until the 1820s formed part of the boundary of the Auchans deer park. The whole herd was removed by the Earl of Eglinton to the Eglinton Castle policies. The woods around the property were extensive and old; Auchans had been long been famed as a preserve for game. The OS map of the mid-19th century shows a rabbit warren in the central area between the Beech Wood and the Kemp Law areas.

== Wallace, Cochrane and Montgomerie families ==
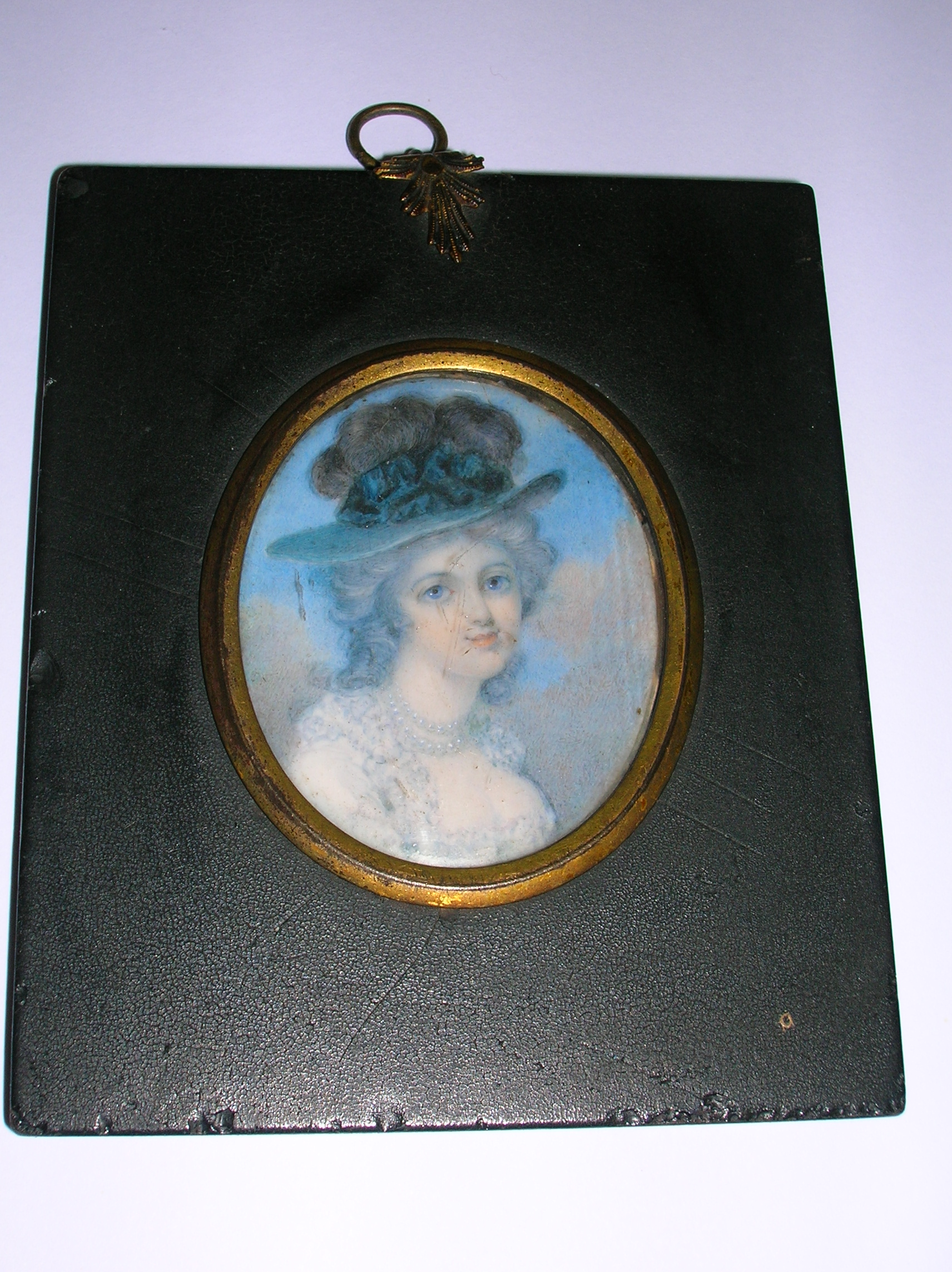
Susanna Montgomery, Lady Eglinton

In 1527 the estate of Achynche (Auchans) was first held by the Wallaces of Dundonald. The 1609 will of James Wallace, younger brother of the laird John Wallace of Dundonald, mentions his music books and costume. Colonel James Wallace was the last of that family to occupy the castle; he was an active supporter of the Solemn league and Covenant and led the rising at Pentland in November 1666. He died in exile in Rotterdam in 1678. His family were a branch of the Wallaces of Craigie. In 1640 the estate passed to his relative Sir William Cochrane of Cowdon, an arrangement carried out prior to Colonel Wallace's participation in the insurrection.

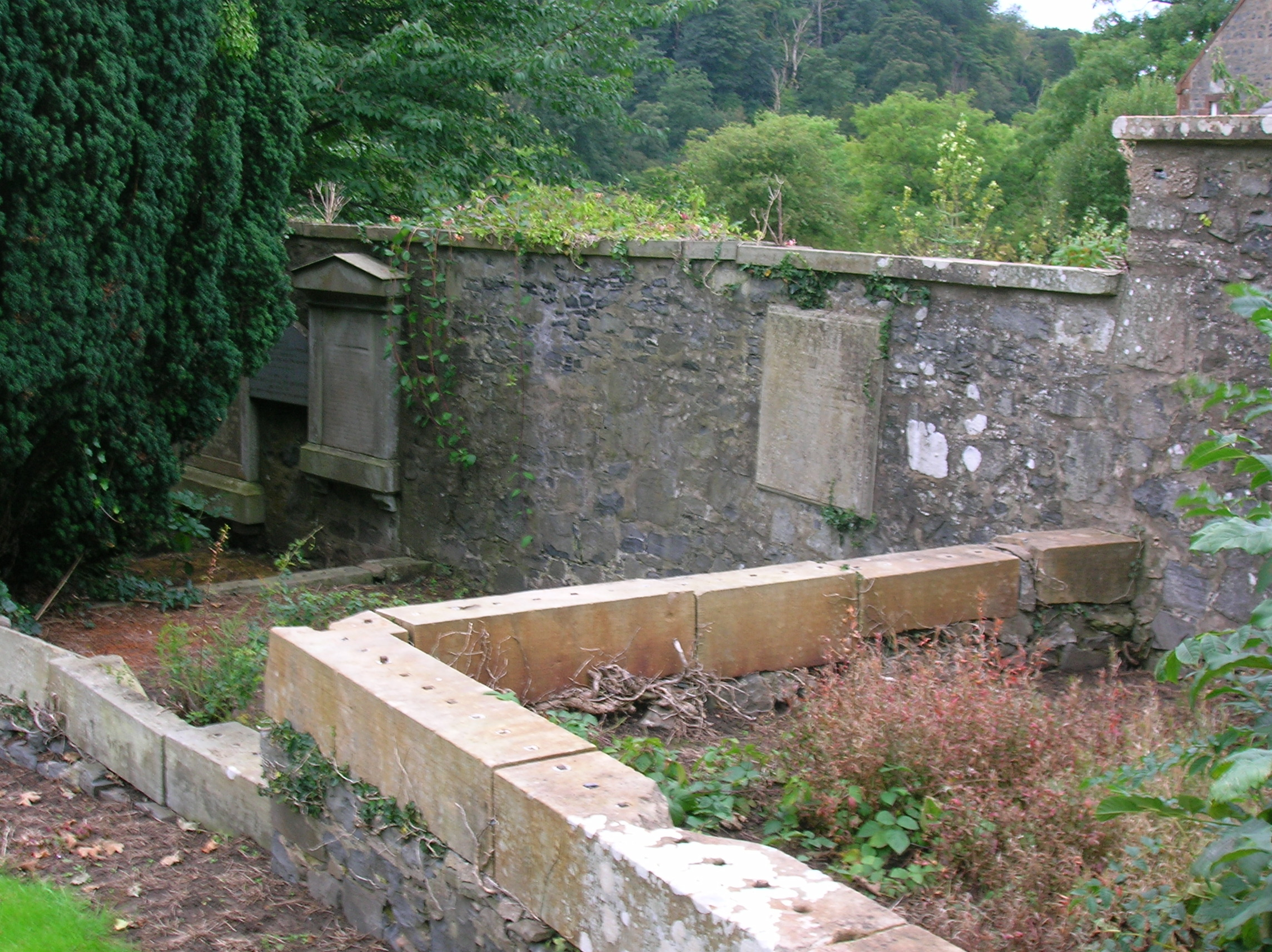
The Auchans Burial Ground, Dundonald Parish Church

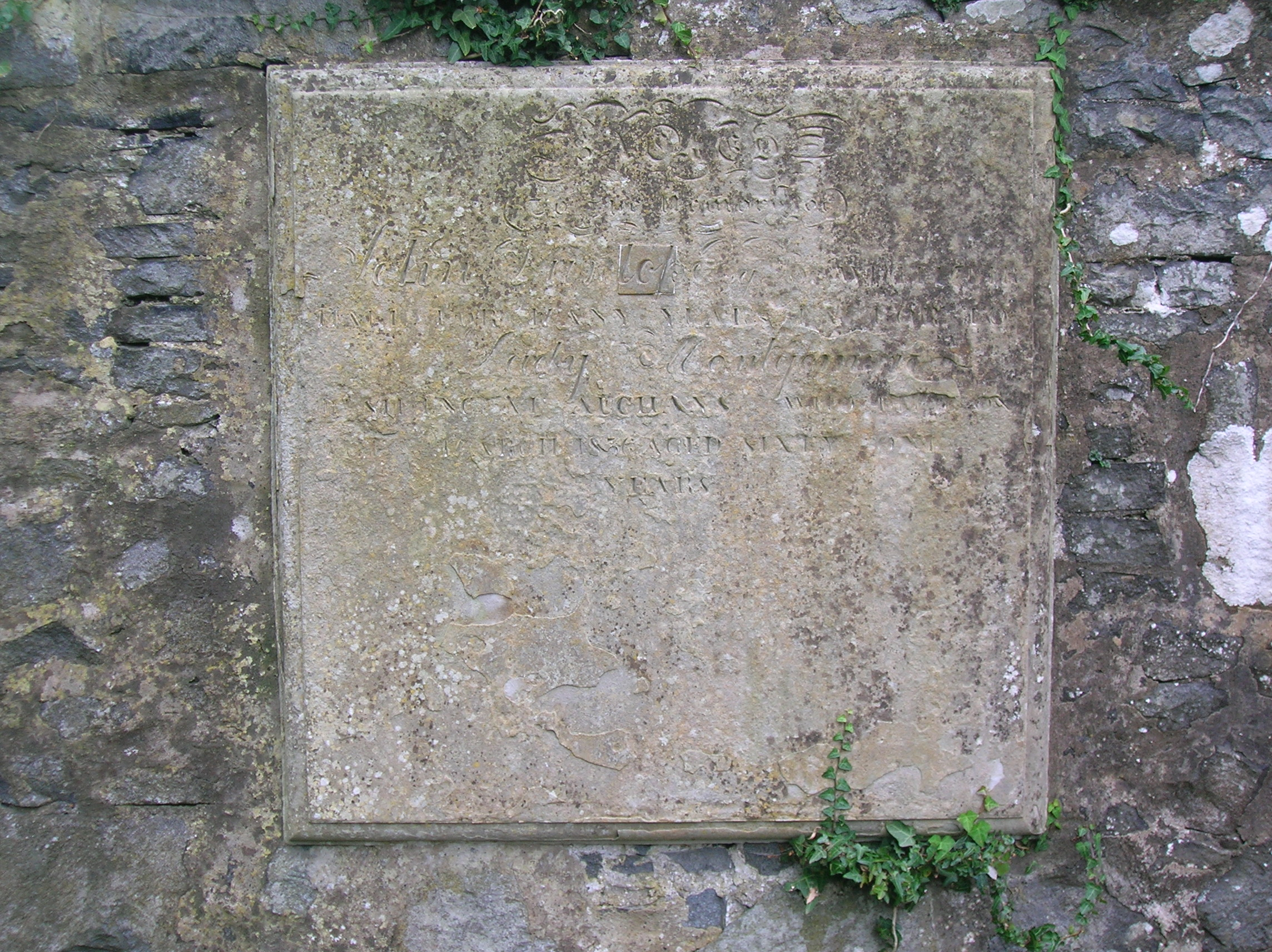
Memorial to John Dunlop Esq., onetime Factor at Auchans

Sir William also suffered during the Civil War, but after the restoration of the monarchy he was created Earl of Dundonald in 1669 for his services to the Crown. The second earl for a time lived with his mother, Lady Katherine Kennedy, at Auchans, after his father died, circa 1679. Adamson relates ambiguously that the earl lost the estate due to unfortunate scientific speculations. In 1876, it is recorded that one of the side angles had the date of 1644 and another of 1667; a marriage stone had the initials WCD (William Cochrane of Dundonald) and ES (Eupheme Scott) also occurred in two places.

After the death of Lady Eglinton in 1780, Auchans housed workmen's families. Archibald, the 11th Earl of Eglinton lived here for a while at some stage. The Dundonald cemetery houses the Auchans burial ground, next to that of Craighouse, Fairlie house and Shewalton House. John Dunlop Esq. of Whitmuir Hall near Selkirk has a memorial plaque, giving the fact that he was Factor to Lady Susanna Montgomery at Auchans and died in 1836, aged 61. John Dunlop Esq. is quoted by William Aiton as having set up and recorded rainfall with a rain gauge at Auchans House in 1808-1809.

In 1846 the property was owned by Lady Mary Montgomerie, by whose servants it was chiefly inhabited and it was becoming ruinous, with parts untenanted and locked up. The structure was altered quite considerably to accommodate the workmen and some features, such as ornate marble fireplaces, were removed and taken to Auchans House, now demolished. In 1875 estate foresters occupied the ground floor, but the roof was well maintained. In 1885 stones had been take to build cottars houses however part of the west wing next to the north gable was re-roofed. Janet Gilchrist, a single lady, was at the time employed as a caretaker and remained until 1897.

In 1892, following the death of Archibald William, the 14th Earl of Eglinton, his daughter Lady Sofia Constance Montgomerie inherited the Auchans estate that comprised the house and policies together with the farms of Bogside, Broomhill, Clevance, Crooks, Girtrig, Guilliland, Highlees, Kilnford, Laurieston, Parkthorn and Ploughland.

The building was able to be used during World War I to house German prisoners of war, however by 1922 the roof had largely collapsed.

Auchans was at one point re-acquired by the Earl of Dundonald, who owned Auchans House in 1951. Attempts are occasionally made to restore the castle, including interest by the Clan Wallace Society.

=== Lady Susanna Montgomery, dowager countess of Eglinton ===
It was traditional and practical for a dowager to move out of the family seat and dwell within a dower house or jointure-house. Susanna as dowager countess first moved to Kilmaurs Place and then to Auchans. Letters from 1765 are recorded as being written at Auchans and in 1762 she wrote in a letter to her son-in-law James Moray of Abercairney that her son (the tenth Earl) had given her Auchans House and that she was about to repair it. Millar records that after the murder, by Mungo Campbell, of her son Alexander, tenth Earl of Eglintoun, in 1769, she had retired from the position which she held in society and when her second son Archibald (the 11th Earl) was married in 1772, she took up her residence permanently at Auchans. She lived at Auchans for eight years.

Susanna is remembered for eccentrically taming a number of rats at Auchans to come for food at her table when she tapped on an oak wall panel and opened a small door. These ten or twelve rats would leave when instructed to; she commented that she valued the gratitude they showed, something she had rarely received from humans.

=== Views of Auchans Castle ===
Recorded names for Auchans are Achinynche (15th Century), Auchinche (1512), Achans, Achnes, possibly derived from the Gaelic 'Achaidhean' - 'tilled fields'. Auchans Castle, House of Auchans, Old Auchans and Auchans are modern day renderings that have resulted in confusion with other nearby houses.

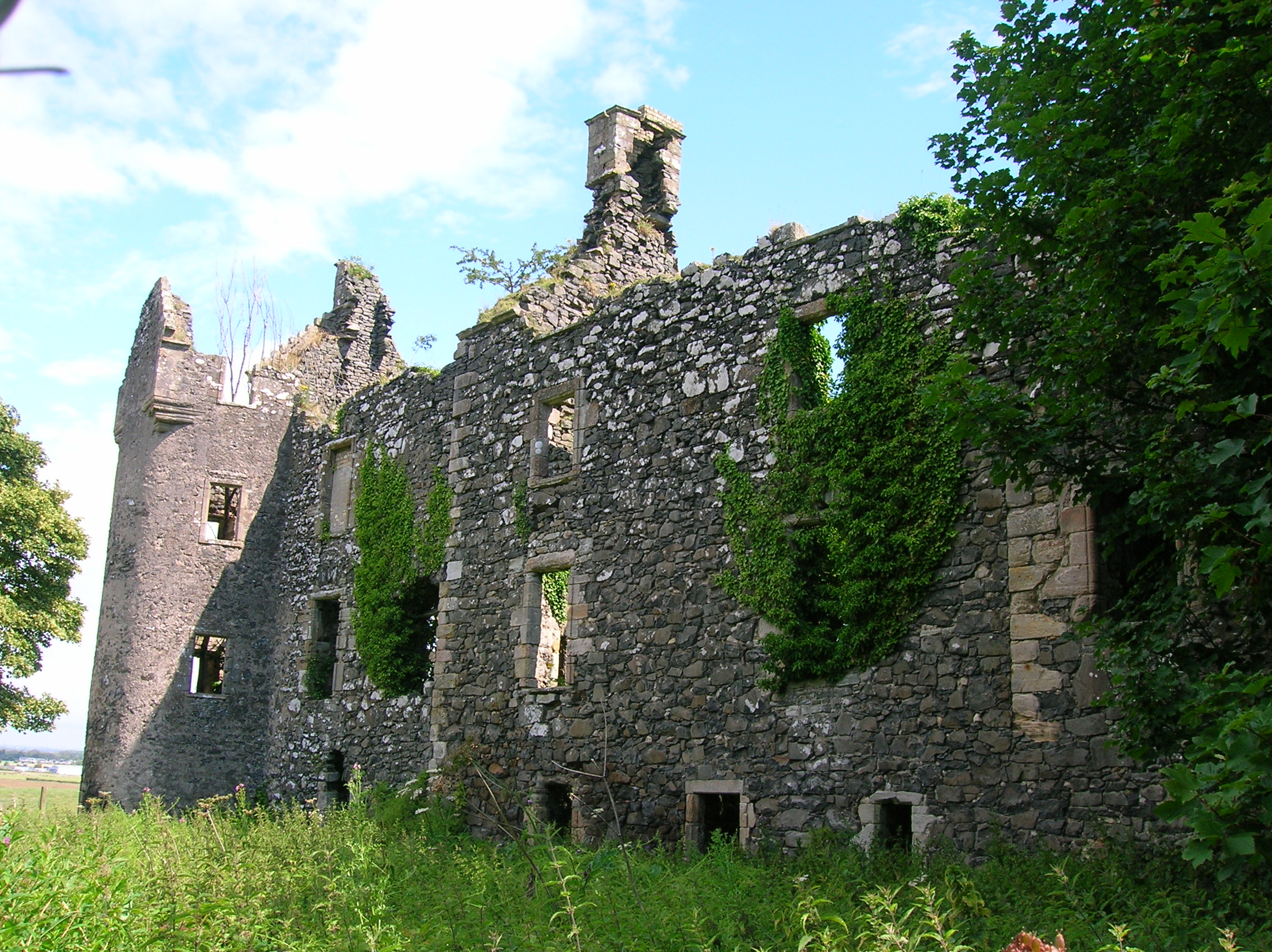
A view from the South-East of Auchans in 2009

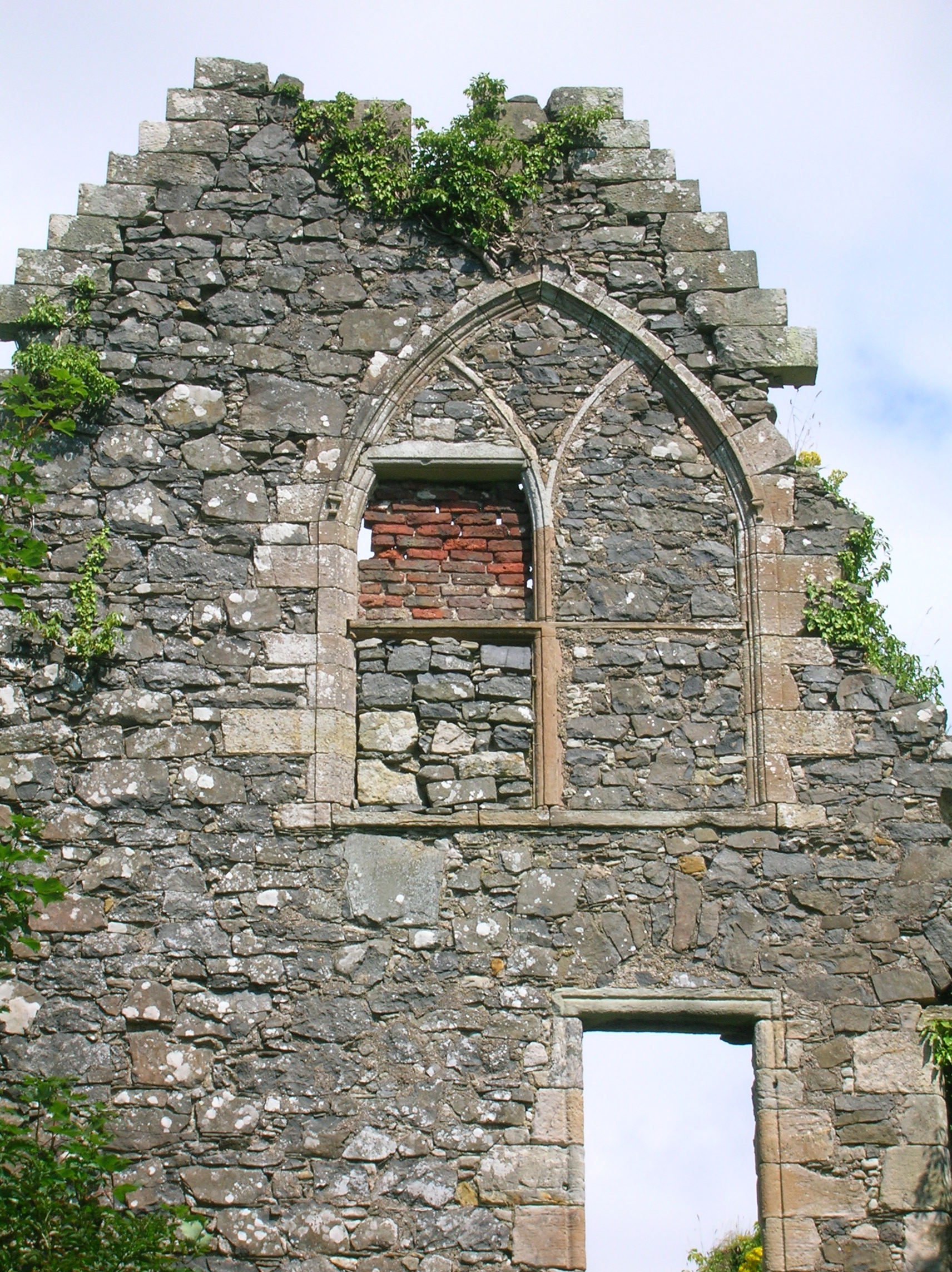
Traceried window in the East gable end

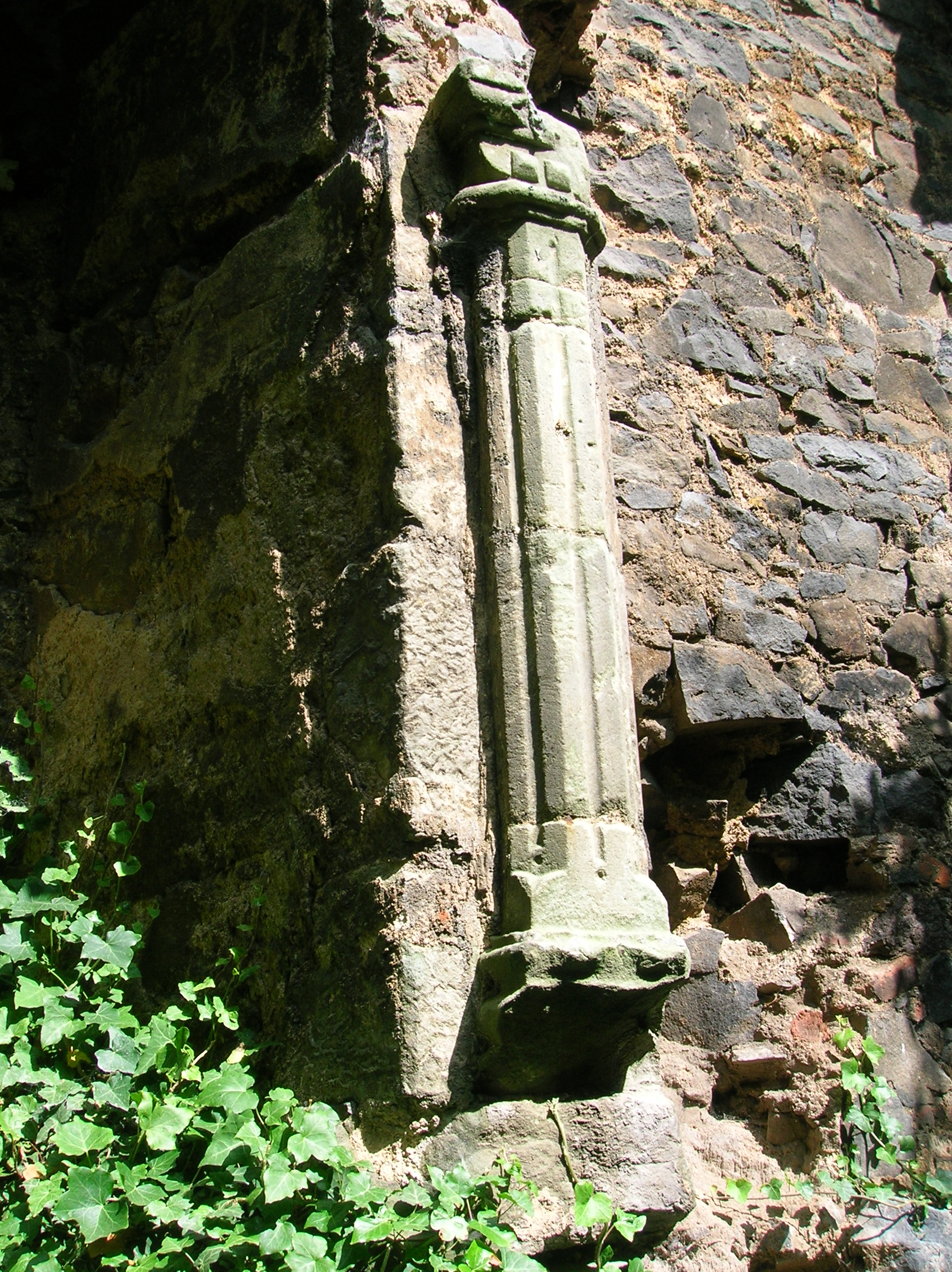
Details of old fireplace

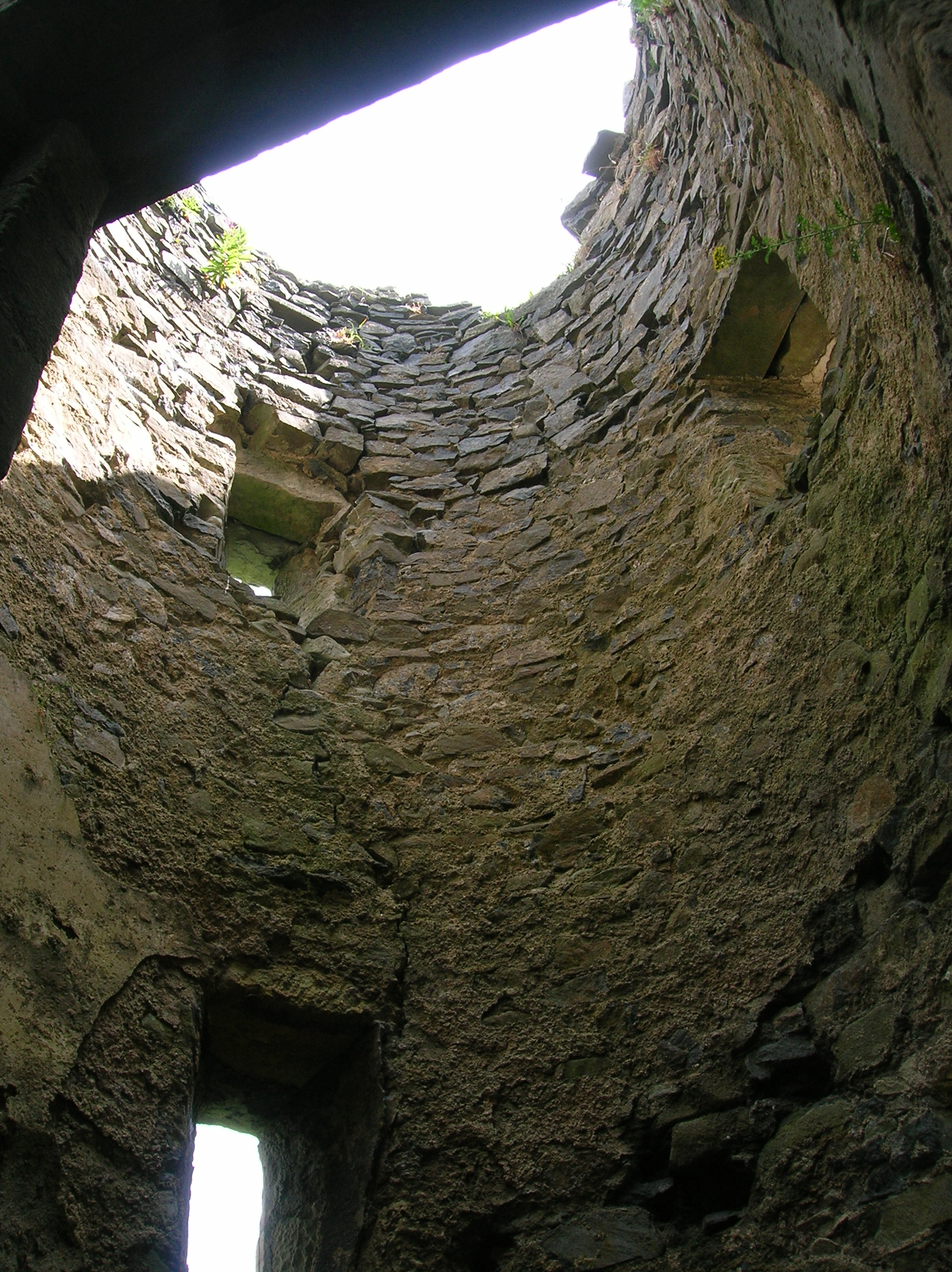
The interior of one of the round towers

=== Meeting with Samuel Johnson and James Boswell ===
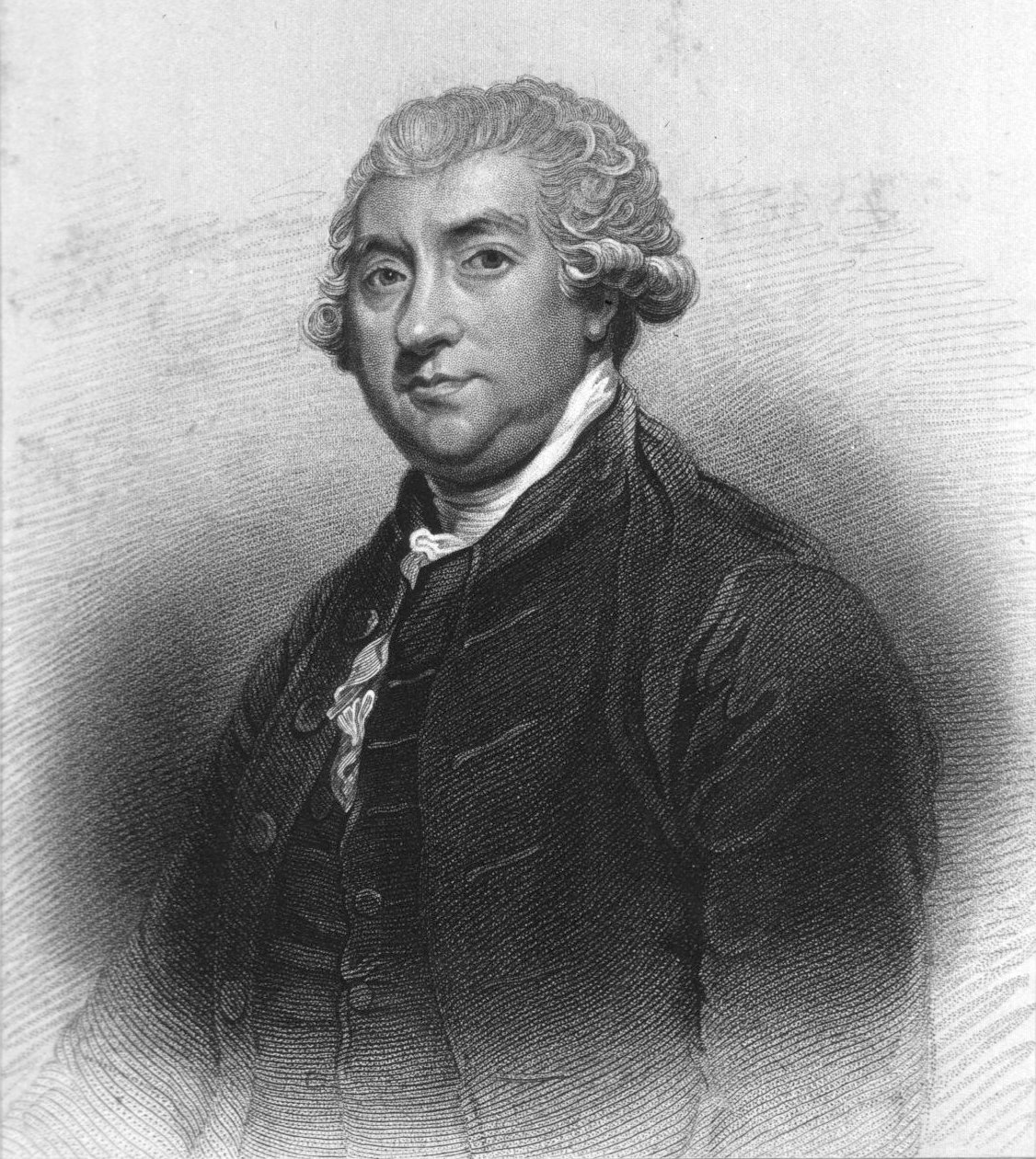
James Boswell of Auchinleck

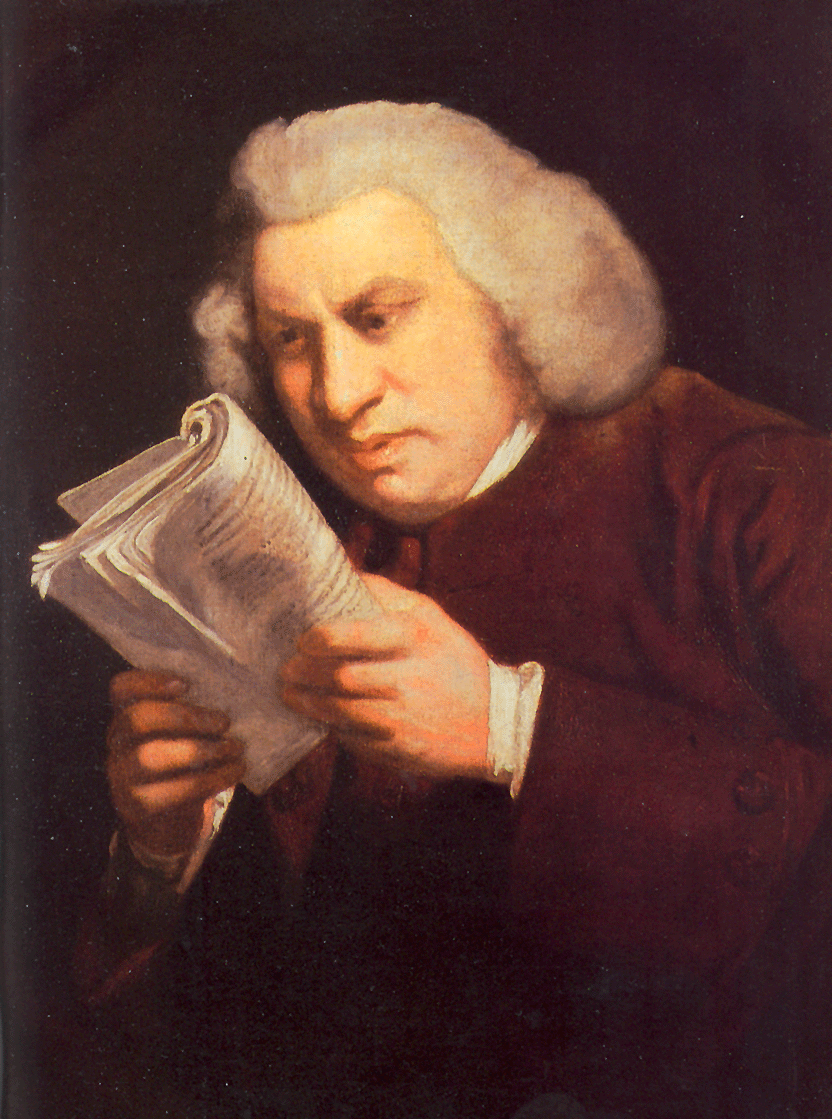
Samuel Johnson by Joshua Reynolds

In 1773 James Boswell and Samuel Johnson visited Lady Susanna, now the Dowager Countess, at her home, Auchans. She embraced Johnson upon his departure and commented that as she was old enough to be his mother, she would adopt him. Auchans is now Old Auchans and stands as a substantial ruin in 2009. Her son Alexander already knew Johnson and had passed on much information about him to his mother.

Johnson, in a letter to Mrs Thrale, described Susanna as a lady who for many years gave the laws of elegance to Scotland. She is in full vigour of mind, and not much impaired in form. She is only eighty-three. She was remarking that her marriage was in the year eight; and I told her my birth was in the year nine. 'Then,' says she, 'I am just old enough to be your mother, and I will take you for my son.' At last night came, and I was sorry to leave her.

== Auchans House (new) ==
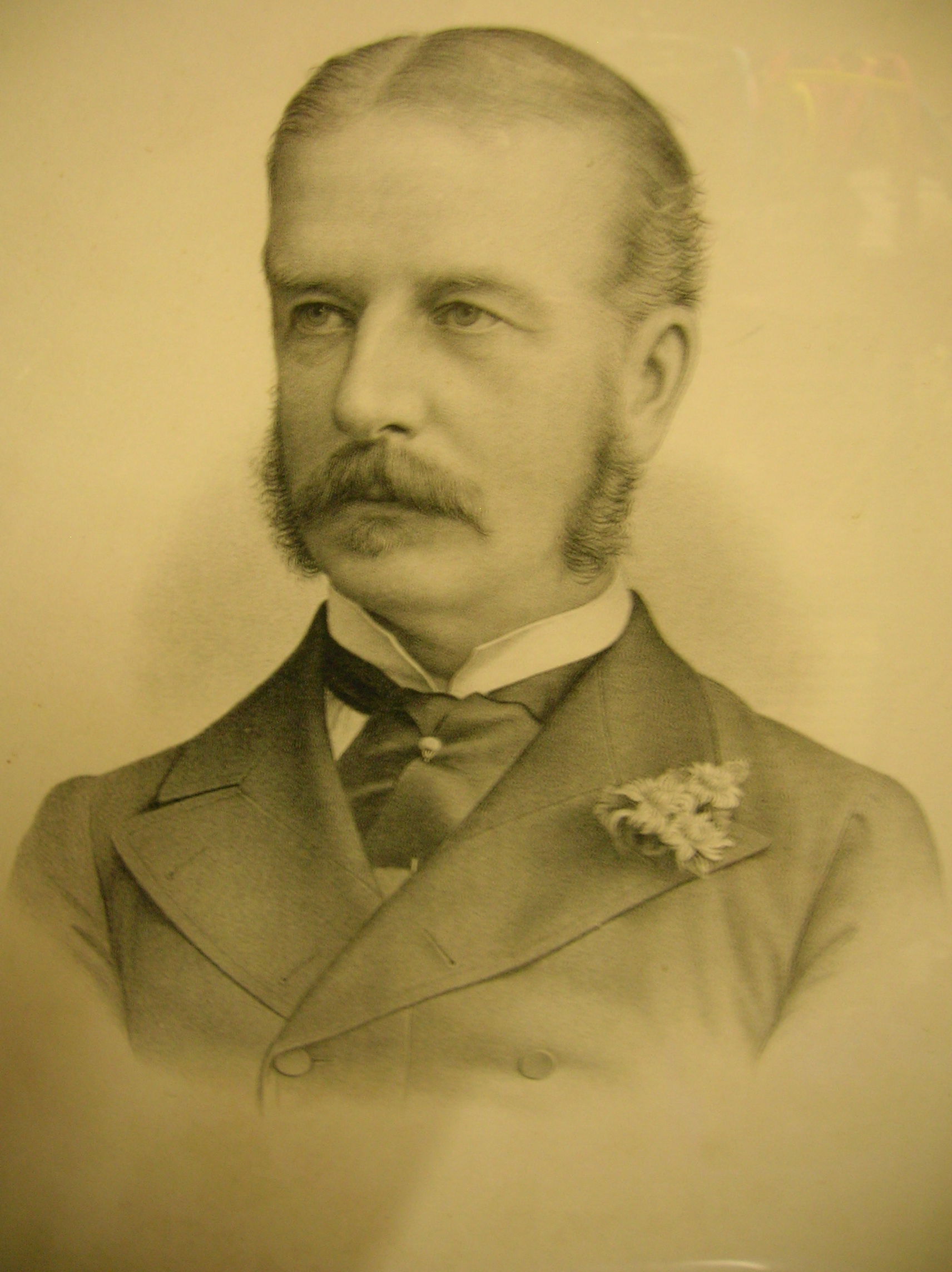
Commissioner Vernon

A new Auchans House (NS 36035 34900) was built circa 1819 by Monteaulieu Burgess of Coilsfield, designed by William Wallace. Love in 2005 states that the house was in fact built for the Earl of Eglinton and that Burgess was his Commissioner, followed in 1885 by the Hon. Greville Richard Vernon, son of the 1st Lord Lyveden. Major Coats of the Paisley thread manufacturers tenanted the house at one time, as did the Beattie banking family. In 1947 the Earl of Eglinton sold the house to the Earl of Dundonald. The house was sold by the Earl of Dundonald in 1960 to a builder and then demolished in 1970 and the site has since been developed as a housing estate on the edge of Dundonald.

An Auchans Mains recorded in 1832 by John Thomson lay near Kilnford close to Dundonald and was later renamed as Auchans House; this house now lies under the housing estate. A place, possibly a farmstead, named as 'Old Auchans' on the OS map (NS 3536 3447) lies as a ruin in the Beech Wood above the ruined Auchans qv 'Auchans Castle.' The repeated use of the name 'Auchans' has confused the sites over the ages.

Etymology
The name Auchans is Gaelic and an 'Achin' is a 'fauld' or 'field' created from the clearance of 'wild' land. Thus this was once farmland made during the first clearances of woodland.

The new mansion of Auchans was built in the style of an Italian villa, with projecting glazed porch, giving access to the hall and main staircase. The land around the house was richly wooded, and this character was carefully preserved, so that from whatever side the dwelling was approached it was against a background of woodland. The carriage-drive was bordered for a considerable distance with a symmetrical parterre of flowers, and an extensive conservatory formed an exterior wing to the mansion-house.

The principal decoration of the main front wall consisted of the ivy and other trained shrubs. The mantelpieces and surrounds moved from Old Auchans may have survived as the 1960 sale details specifically exclude these items.

== Archaeology ==
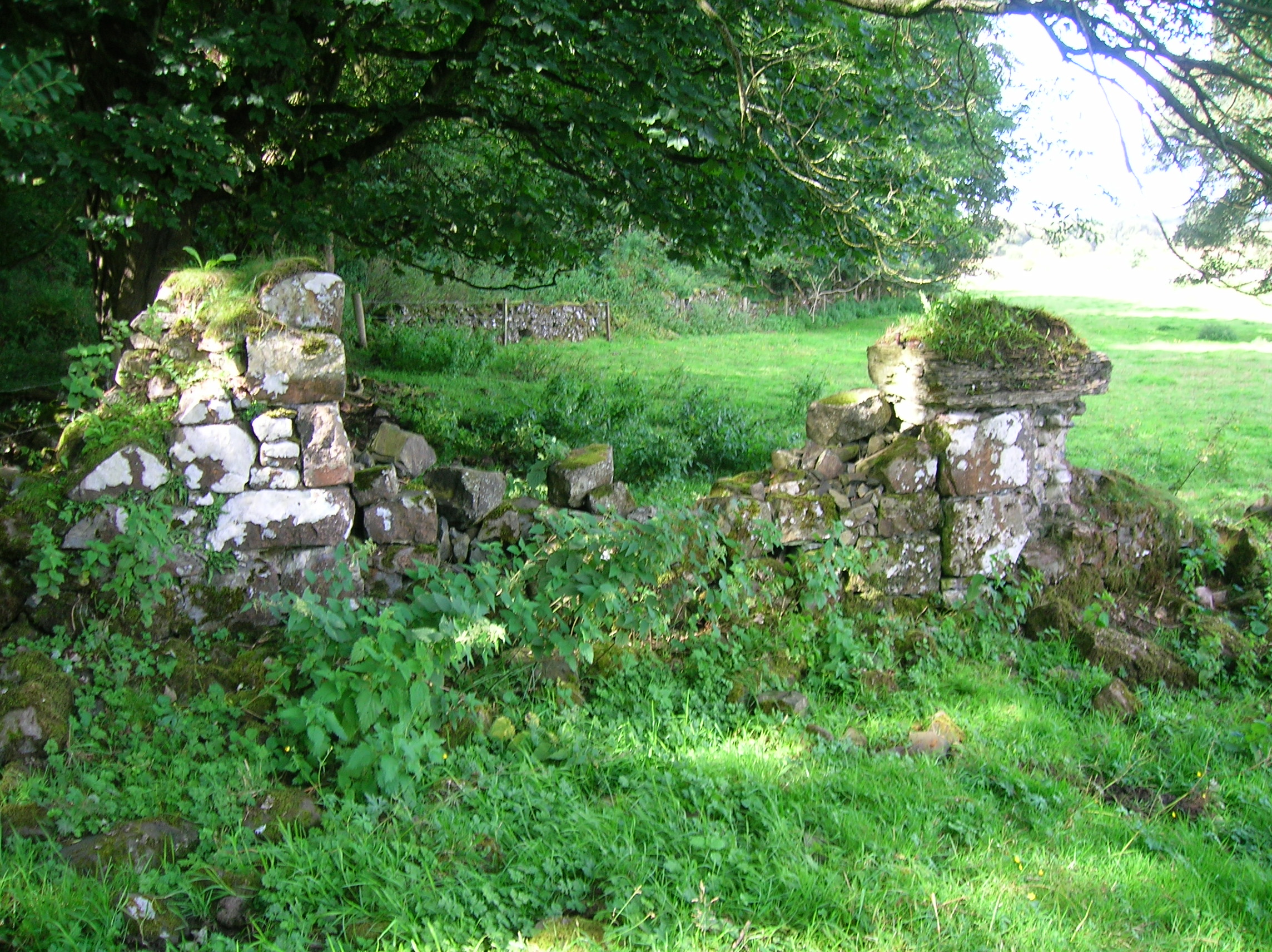
Old blocked gated entrance at the Auchans Paddocks near the old stables.

An axe-hammer from Auchans Castle is now preserved in the Dick Institute, Kilmarnock. An urn, containing fragments of human bones, was found near Auchans Castle by a workman who was digging in a small mound of gravel. The urn, crudely made, disintegrated on exposure, and the remaining fragments were sent to the nearby Dundonald manse, where they were kept for some time. There is no local tradition of a tumulus having existed where this burial urn was found. An extensive area of rig-and-furrow cultivation near the castle has been recorded from aerial photographs.

The OS map of the mid-19th century shows a fort on the heights at the Hallyards.

== Natural history ==
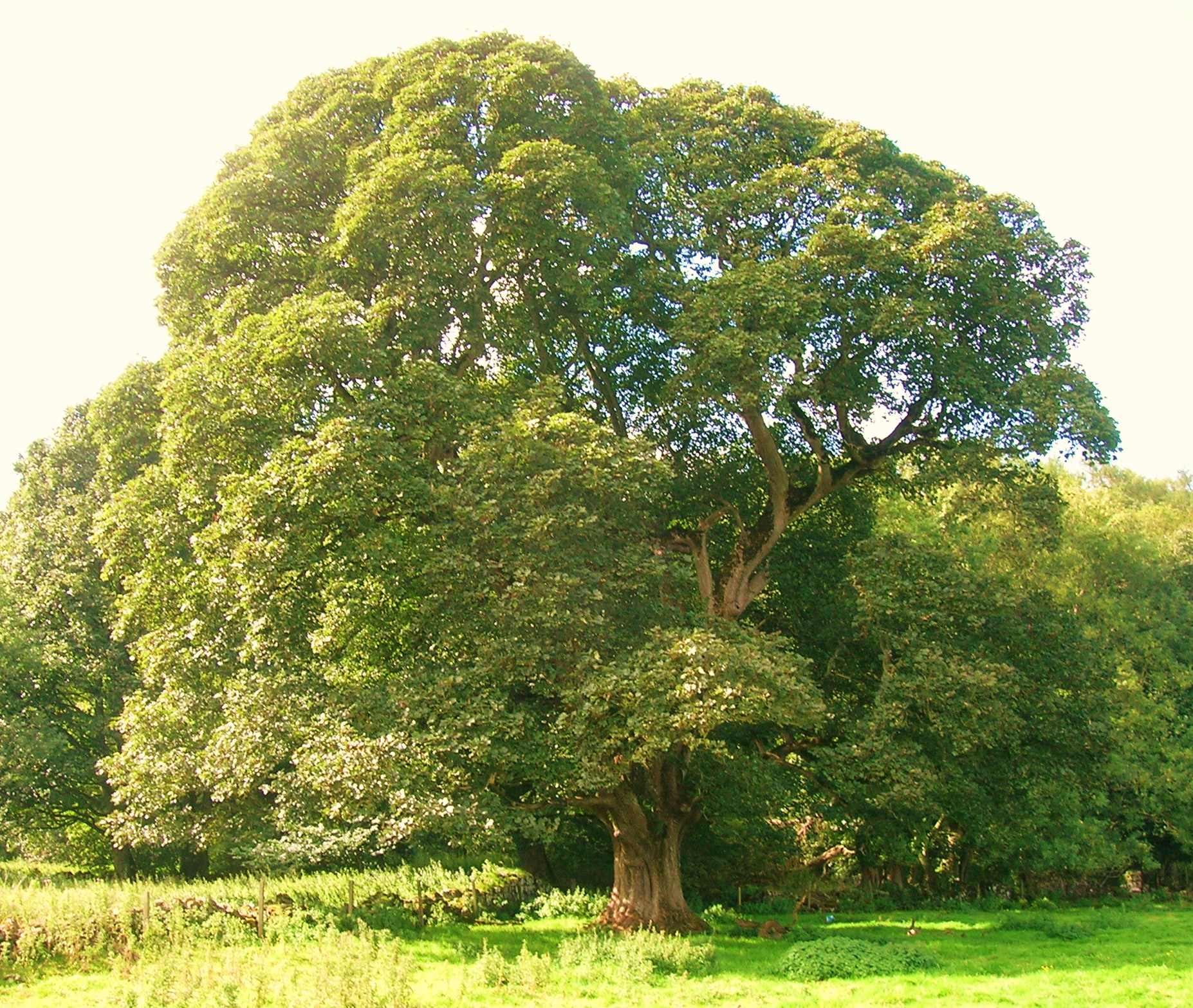
Ancient sycamore maiden at Auchans Castle in the old paddocks

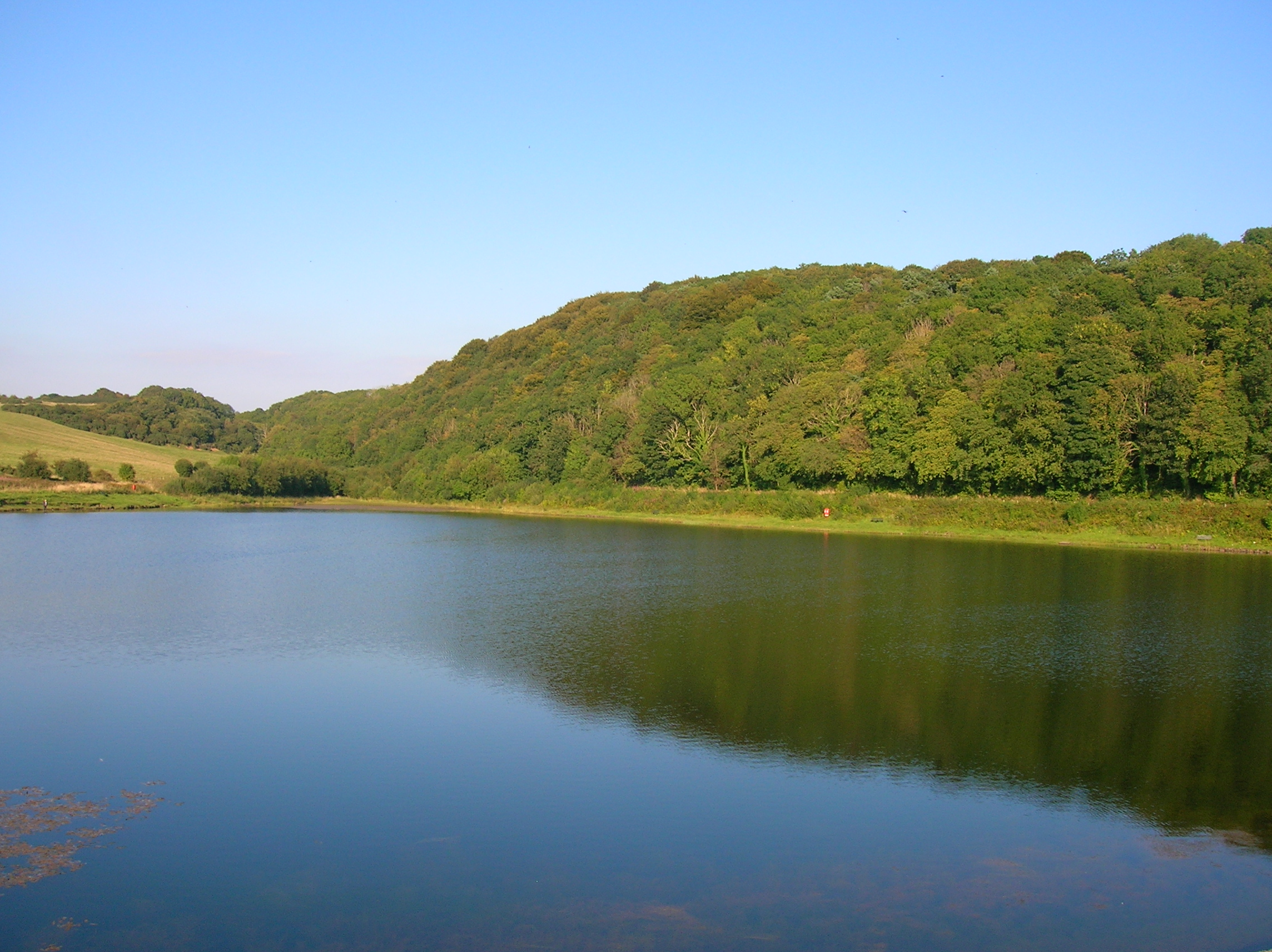
The Aught Woods and Collennan Reservoir

Dundonald Woods (NS363343) are one of the most extensive areas of elm-dominated woodlands in Ayrshire. Ash, oak and sycamore are also abundant; much of the policies are composed of derelict-coppiced-type growth from trees felled in the Second World War. Some conifer plantations are present. Wetland habitats are also present, with springs, an old reservoir near Collennan and a very eutrophic water body, Merklands Loch, all contributing to the high biodiversity of the site. Dog's Mercury, Wood Melick, Broad-leaved Helleborine, and Giant Bellflower are amongst the significant plants present. The policies of Auchans Castle still (2010) contain several ancient sycamores of over five metres circumference. Aught Woods lie on a slope running down towards the Collennan Smallholdings.
