= Iain Cochrane, 15th Earl of Dundonald =

British politician and peer (born 1961)

The Right Honourable The Earl of Dundonald

Personal details
- Born: Iain Alexander Douglas Blair Cochrane; 17 February 1961 (age 65)
- Spouse: Beatrice L. Russo (m. 1987)
- Children: 3
- Parents: Iain Cochrane, 14th Earl of Dundonald; Aphra Farquhar
- Education: Wellington College
- Alma mater: Royal Agricultural College

Iain Alexander Douglas Blair Cochrane, 15th Earl of Dundonald (born 17 February 1961), styled Lord Cochrane until 1986, is a Scottish peer. He was a member of the House of Lords from 1986 until the reforms made by the House of Lords Act 1999.

== Early life ==
Dundonald is the only son of Iain Cochrane, 14th Earl of Dundonald and his first wife Aphra Farquhar (died 1972).

He was educated at Wellington College and RAC Cirencester. He succeeded his father in the earldom in 1986, and became chairman of Duneth Securities in the same year.

== Personal life ==
On 4 July 1987, Dundonald married Beatrice L. Russo, of Gibraltar, by whom he has two sons and a daughter:

- Archibald Iain Thomas Cochrane, Lord Cochrane (born 1991)
- Lady Marina Aphra Mariola Cochrane (born 1992)
- Hon. James Douglas Richard Cochrane (born 1995)

Dundonald and his wife separated and were divorced in 2011.

He lives at Lochnell Castle and is the honorary Chilean consul to Scotland. He has been a director of Anglo Digital, Ltd., since 2000.

Peerage of Scotland
Preceded by Iain Cochrane	Earl of Dundonald; 1986–present	Incumbent; Heir apparent: Archie Cochrane, Lord Cochrane
