= Dundonald Castle =

Castle in South Ayrshire, Scotland

- Dundonald, South Ayrshire, Scotland
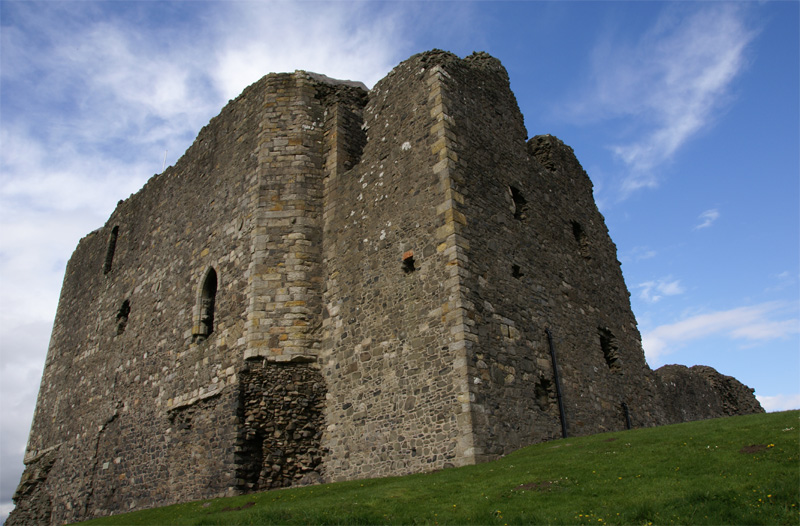
- From south west

Site information
- Open to the public: Yes
- Condition: Ruin
- Website: Official website

Location
- Location within Scotland
- Coordinates: 55.57681°N 4.5972°W

Dundonald Castle is situated on a hill overlooking the village of Dundonald, between Kilmarnock and Troon in South Ayrshire, Scotland. Dundonald Castle is a fortified tower house built for Robert II on his accession to the throne of Scotland in 1371 and it was used as a royal residence by Robert II and his son Robert III.

== History ==
=== Dark age hill fort ===
The present castle stands on land where evidence suggests there was a hill fort. It is thought that a mixture of large timber-built roundhouse and straight-sided structures occupied the interior. A timber-laced stone rampart defined and defended the fort. The timber lacing caught fire and burnt with such intensity that the surrounding stonework melted, or vitrified. This firing happened about 1000 AD and seems to mark the end of the hill-fort’s existence. It was about this date that the Kingdom of Strathclyde ceased to exist, being absorbed into the Kingdom of Scotland.

The place name Dundonald means "fort of Donald". It appears to be derived from *Din Dyfnwal (the personal name Dyfnwal is cognate to the Scottish Gaelic Dòmhnall and Donald). The eponym of the fortress is unknown, although he may have been any of the numerous kings of Alt Clut/Strathclyde who bore the name Dyfnwal from the eighth century to the tenth century.

=== Early castles ===
There have been three medieval castles present on this site. The first was built by one of the stewards of the king of Scots, most probably Walter, the first steward, who came to Scotland in 1136. There is no surviving evidence of this castle above ground today.

The second castle was built in the late 13th century by Alexander Stewart, 4th High Steward, this castle was predominantly built of stone. It would have been one of the grandest baronial residences of its time. It was largely destroyed by the Scottish during the Wars of Scottish Independence in the early 14th century. King Robert the Bruce's policy was to slight (demolish) most castles so they could not be used by enemies including much greater castles than Dundonald, such as Edinburgh Castle and Roxburgh Castle. There is little remaining of this castle, however there is a well and a rounded stump of a tower near to the present.

=== The present castle ===
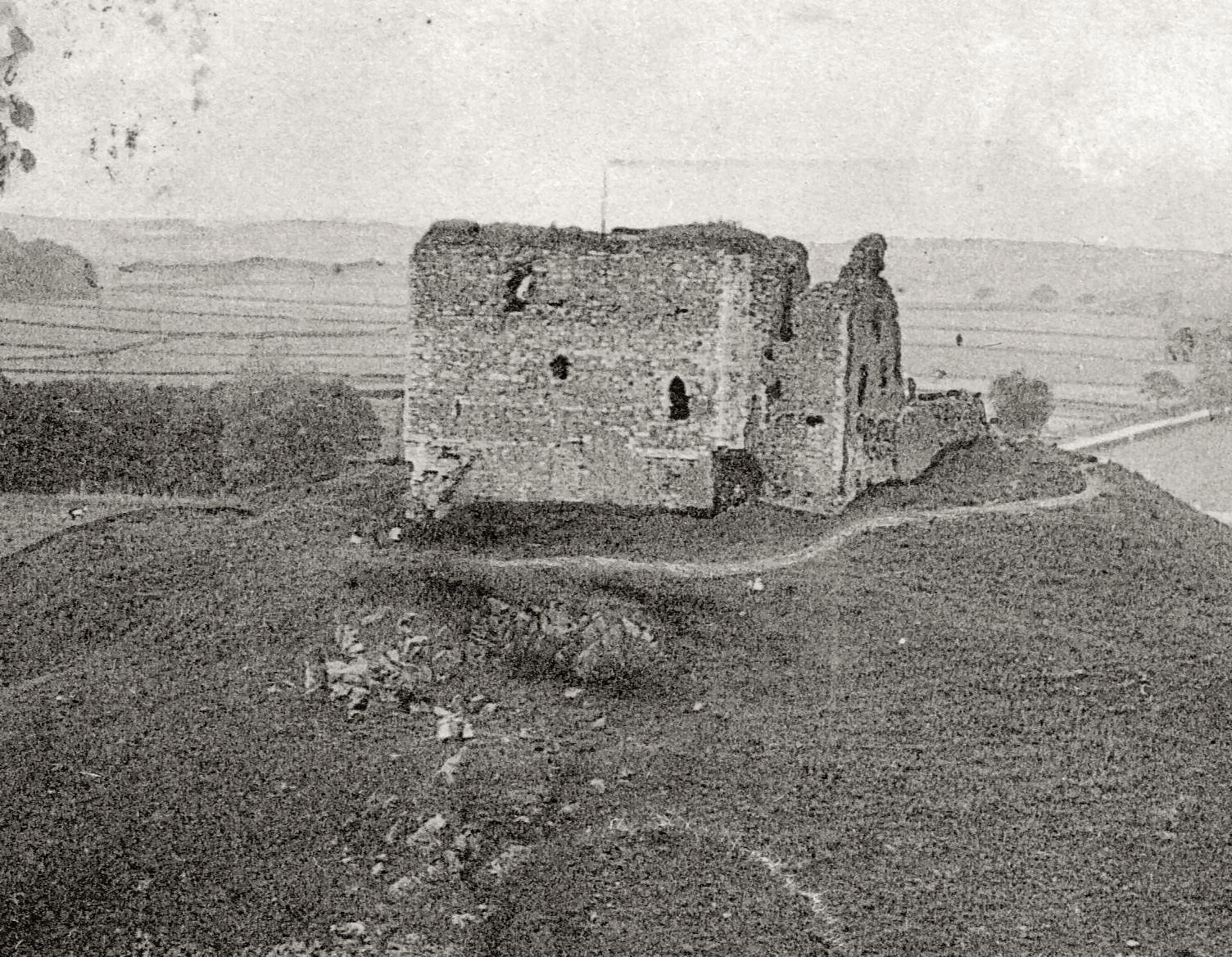
Dundonald Castle in 1903.

The third castle was built by Robert Stewart, probably to mark his accession to the throne as Robert II in 1371. It was three storeys high.

The top floor above the lofty stone vault was the upper hall – the great hall. It was for the more private use of the king and family. The first floor was the lower of the two halls – the laigh hall. It would have been used for more public activities like feasting and the holding of the baron court. The ground floor was a storage area. It was probably originally subdivided providing cellars for different commodities like wine, ale, foodstuffs and fuel.

The tower house was extended in the late 14th century to add additional private chambers and a prison. The outer courtyard (called more properly the barmkin) was completed and ancillary buildings (stables, bakehouses, brewhouses, smithy, etc.) built against the barmkin wall.

The third castle comprised almost everything that is visible above ground today, including the tower which dominates the hill.

Dundonald castle once had its own chapel dedicated to Saint Inan.

=== Auchens House ===
By 1520 the castle was in the possession of the Wallaces of Craigie. In 1536 King James V granted the castle and its estates to Robert Boyd, but he was unable to gain possession and, after a second, failed attempt at eviction, Boyd ceded control to the Wallace family. A century later, debt forced the Wallaces to sell the castle in 1632, although by that time the family had moved its main residence to Auchens House, which they had built in the 1580s, in part with materials removed from Dundonald. The buyer was James Mathieson. He sold out to Sir William Cochrane in 1638, when Cochrane also bought Auchens House.

In 1669 Cochrane was created the first Earl of Dundonald for his support to the Royalist cause in the Wars of the Three Kingdoms. In 1726 the Cochranes sold their Dundonald estate but retained possession of the ruined castle. In 1953 the 13th Earl gave the castle to the state which began a programme of reconstruction.

== The castle today ==
There is a visitor centre at the foot of the hill, which includes a cafe, souvenir shop and an interpretive exhibition. The exhibition outlines the history of the castle and its preceding buildings with detailed models of the earlier castles on the site.

The visitor centre is owned by South Ayrshire Council and the castle is owned by Historic Scotland. Both the castle and the visitor centre are operated by the Friends of Dundonald Castle. The castle was made a scheduled monument in 1920 and the schedule was updated in 2017.

A ley tunnel is said to run from Seagate Castle in Irvine to Dundonald Castle.

== Archaeology ==
Minor archaeological investigations took place at Dundonald in the 1960s. These established that the rubble base was up to 4 feet in depth and rested on bedrock, which had been deliberately levelled with stones to form a cobbled surface. The curtain wall of the inner courtyard was shown to have been butted on to the keep, and rested on bedrock without any footings. The keep would seem to be resting on ashlar footings or underpinnings, a single course projecting in front of the castle wall. Part of this was pointed with mortar of nineteenth century date, probably contemporary with the consolidation work carried out at that period. There were no significant finds.

Three main seasons of archaeological excavation were completed between 1986 and 1988, in advance of a programme of conservation. Subsequently a series of smaller-scale excavations were undertaken finishing in 1993. These excavations were led by Gordon Ewart (Kirkdale Archaeology) and focussed on the area within the barmkin enclosure of the present castle. They discovered material indicating multiple periods of occupation, dating back to the Bronze Age.

The material discovered relates to:

- Charcoal-rich layers, possibly Neolithic.
- Kiln-like structures and a scatter of Bronze Age pottery fragments, the disturbance of which suggests successive phases of a permanent settlement.
- Grains including emmer wheat, which can be present at sites from the Neolithic through to the Iron Age.
- Iron Age Hillfort with several large wooden roundhouses and a fragment of palisade on the lower terrace to the north of the exposed drystone circuit. Successive building on each of the house sites shows an extended period of occupation.
- Shale or lignite bracelets and glass beads suggest the settlement continued to the 4th and 5th centuries AD.

In 2017-18 Historic Environment Scotland (HES) worked in partnership with the Friends of Dundonald Castle on proposals to raise public awareness of the castle as part of the Dundonald Heritage Project. It was hoped that new evaluation would shed valuable light on the development of the site through time, as well as providing a catalyst for continuing local community engagement.

The investigation consisted of a geophysical survey (resistivity, gradiometry and ground-penetrating radar) performed by Rose Geophysics in early 2017, with subsequent public engagement events during Archaeology Month (September). This was followed by a series of excavations, including public engagement, carried out in August 2018 by HES Cultural Resources Team archaeologists along with CFA Archaeology.

== Legend ==
The following extract alludes to an old Scottish folktale about the construction and origins of Dundonald Castle:

In Ayrshire there is an unknown rhyme that is probably very old:

Donald Din
Built his house without a pin,

alluding to Dundonald Castle, the ancient seat of King Robert II, and now the last remaining property in Ayrshire of the noble family who take their title from it. According to tradition, it was built by a hero named Donald Din, or Din Donald, and constructed entirely of stone, without the use of wood, a supposition countenanced by the appearance of the building, which consists of three distinct stories, arched over with strong stonework, the roof of one forming the floor of another.

Donald, the builder, was originally a poor man, but had the faculty of dreaming lucking dreams. Upon one occasion he dreamed, thrice in one night, that if he were to go to London Bridge, he would become a wealthy man. He went accordingly, saw a man looking over the parapet of the bridge, whom he accosted courteously, and, after a little conversation, entrusted with the secret of the occasion of his coming to London Bridge.

The stranger told him that he had made a very foolish errand, for he himself had once had a similar vision, which directed him to go to a certain spot in Ayrshire, in Scotland, where he would find a vast treasure, and, for his part, he had never once thought of obeying the injunction.

From his description of the spot, the sly Scotsman at once perceived that the treasure in question must be concealed in no other place than his own humble kail-yard [cabbage patch] at home, to which he immediately repaired, in full expectation of finding it. Nor was he disappointed; for, after destroying many good and promising cabbages, and completely cracking credit with his wife, who esteemed him mad, he found a large potful of gold coin, with the proceeds of which he built a stout castle for himself, and became the founder of a flourishing family.

=== Legend origins ===
Similar legends can be found throughout Europe and the Middle-East. The earliest version is one of the poems of the Mathanawi titled "In Baghdad, Dreaming of Cairo: In Cairo, Dreaming of Baghdad", by 13th century Persian poet Jalal al-Din Rumi;. This poem was turned into a story in the tale from The One Thousand and One Nights: The man who became rich through a dream; and spread through various countries folklore, children's tales and literature. More recently the story was adapted into the plot of the novel The Alchemist by Paulo Coelho.

== In popular culture ==
Dundonald Castle features in the Jules Verne novel The Underground City. The castle is used as a beacon to drive ships into the coast, where the beacon lighters can then steal the cargo of the stricken ship. Within the novel, the castle is also linked to an underground city beneath Loch Katrine via a tunnel, perhaps adding to the common myth of the ley tunnel.

== Images ==
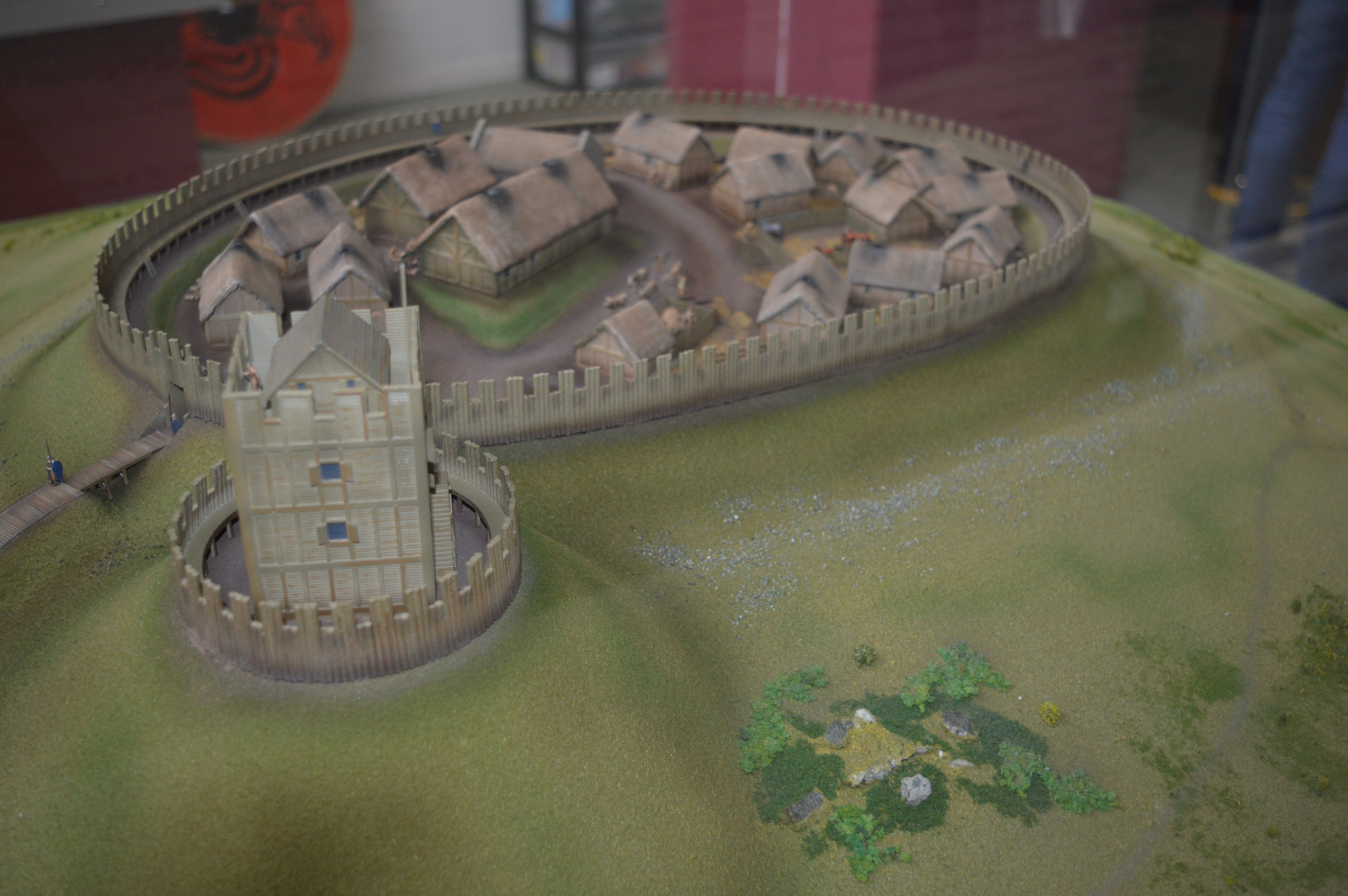

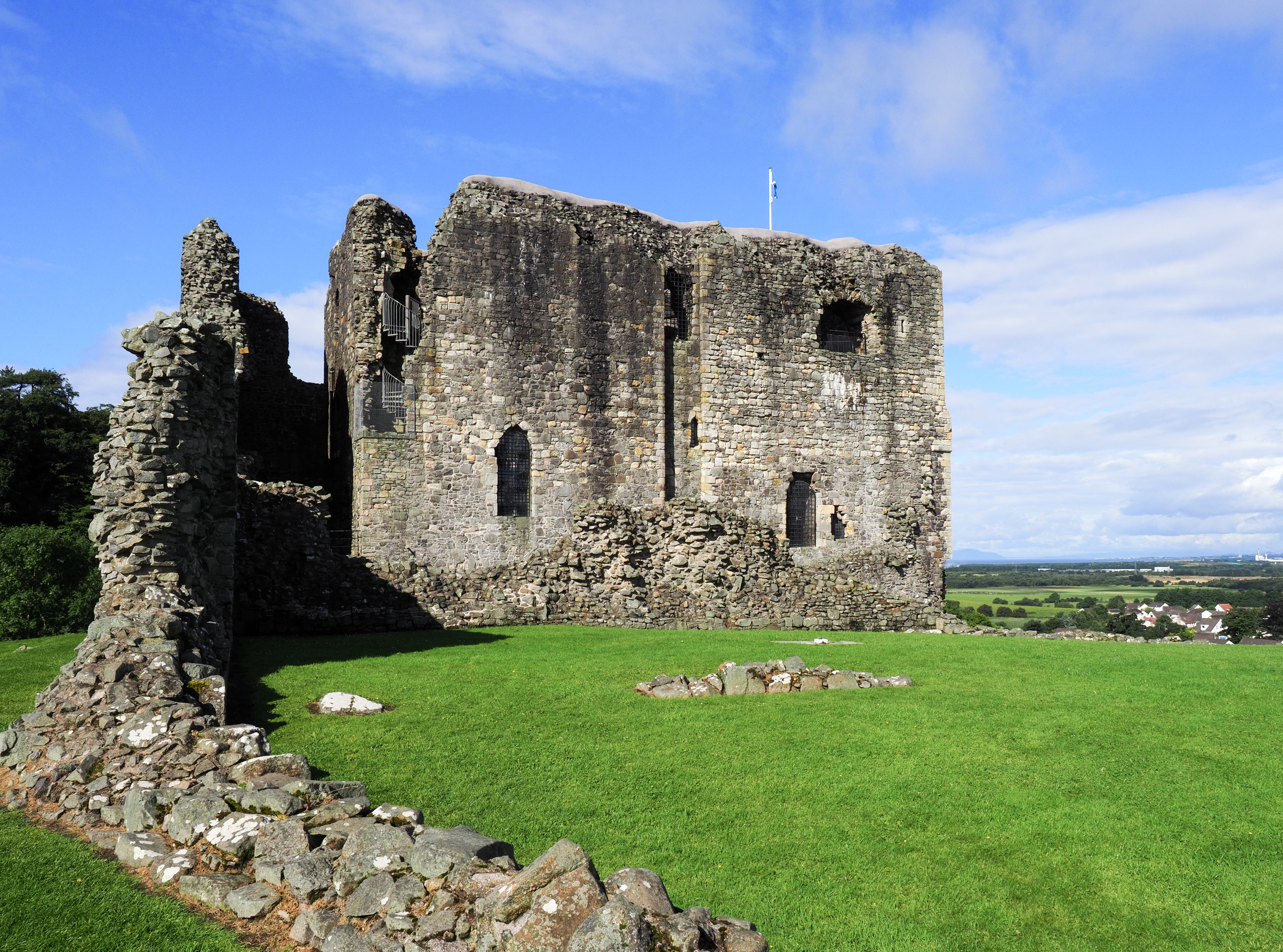

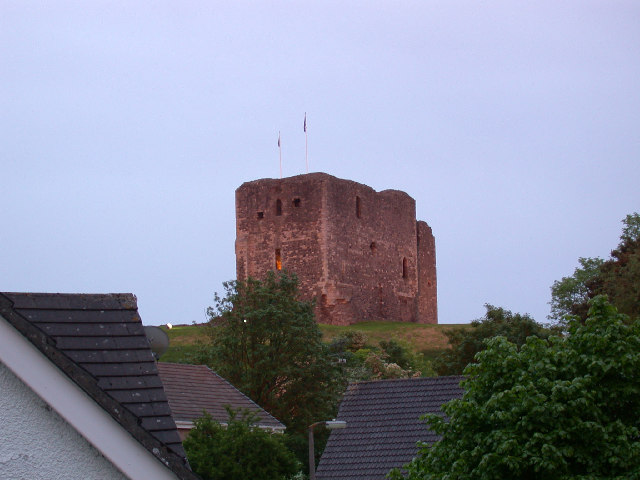

== Sources ==
- Forbes, David; Murray, Keir (2012). Dundonald Castle: Official Souvenir Guide. Dundonald Ayrshire: Friends of Dundonald Castle.
