= Earl of Dundonald =

Scottish peerage title

Earldom of Dundonald
- Creation date: 1669
- Created by: James II of England
- Peerage: Peerage of Scotland
- First holder: William Cochrane, 1st Earl of Dundonald
- Present holder: Iain Cochrane, 15th Earl of Dundonald
- Heir apparent: Archibald Cochrane, Lord Cochrane
- Subsidiary titles: Lord Cochrane of Paisley and Ochiltrie; Lord Cochrane of Dundonald
- Status: Extant
- Seats: Lochnell Castle; Beacon Hall

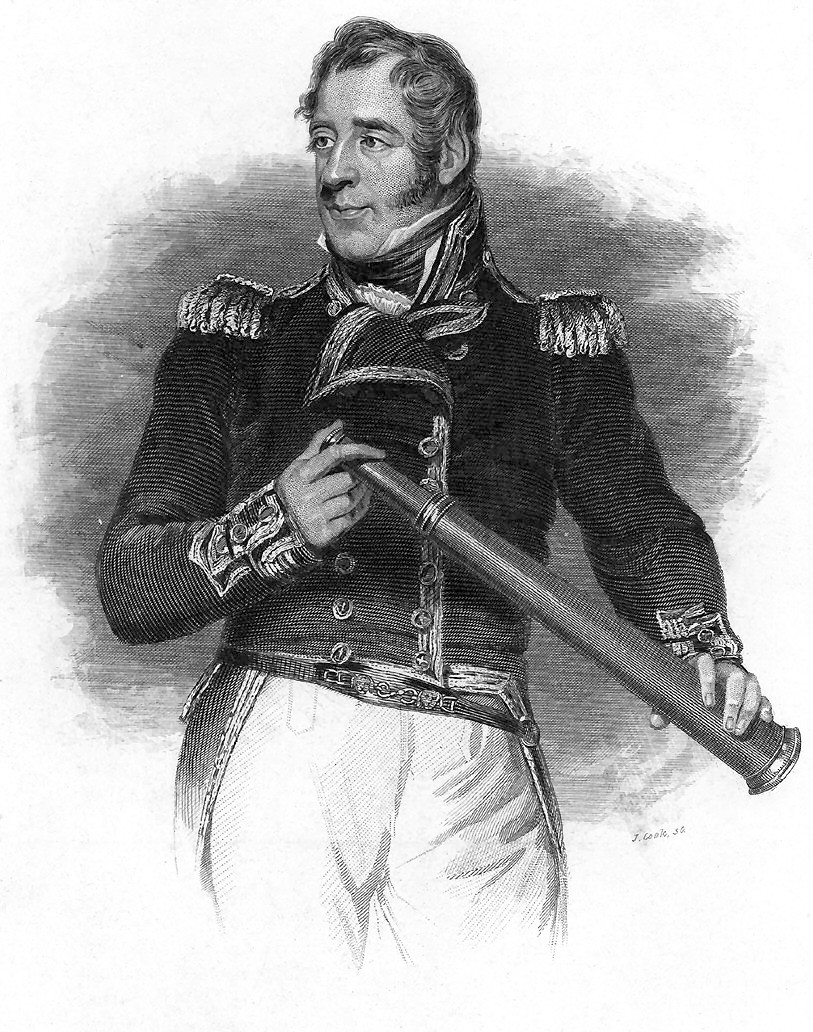
Admiral Thomas Cochrane, 10th Earl of Dundonald, GCB, 1st Marquess of Maranhão. The 10th Earl only inherited the title in 1831 and was known most of his life by the courtesy title "Lord (Baron) Cochrane". He was a noted naval commander and fought in the Napoleonic Wars. His exploits were the basis of such fictional characters as Horatio Hornblower and Jack Aubrey.

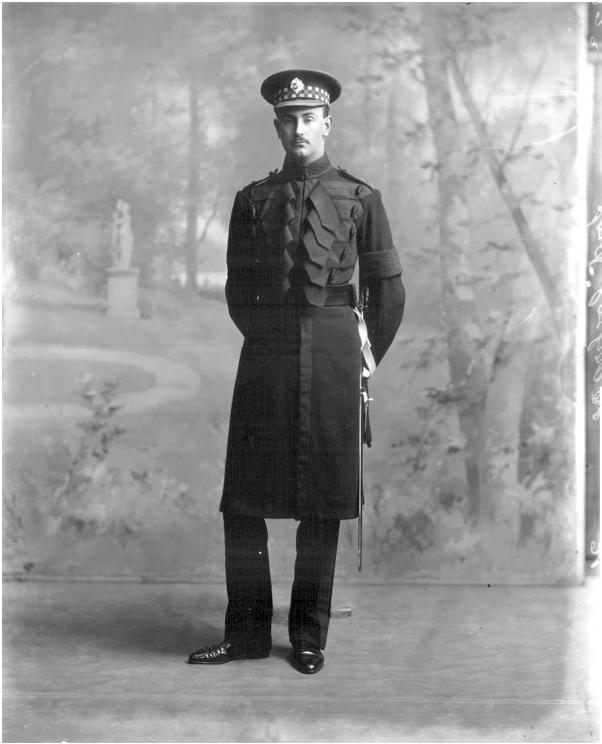
Thomas Hesketh Douglas Blair Cochrane, 13th Earl of Dundonald

Earl of Dundonald is a title in the Peerage of Scotland. It was created in 1669 for the Scottish soldier and politician William Cochrane, 1st Lord Cochrane of Dundonald, along with the subsidiary title of Lord Cochrane of Paisley and Ochiltree, with remainder to his heirs male, failing which to his heirs female without division who should bear or assume the name of Cochrane, and in failure thereof to his heirs general. In 1647, he had already been created Lord Cochrane of Dundonald in the Peerage of Scotland, with remainder to the heirs male of his body.

== History ==
The first Earl was succeeded by his grandson John Cochrane, the second Earl (died 1690). He was the son of William Cochrane, Lord Cochrane (died 1679), eldest son of the 1st Earl. The 2nd Earl was a member of the Scottish Privy Council. On his death the titles passed to his eldest son William Cochrane, the third Earl (died 1705). He died unmarried at an early age and was succeeded by his younger brother John Cochrane, the fourth Earl (died 1720). He sat in the House of Lords as a Scottish representative peer from 1713 to 1715. When he died the titles passed to his son William Cochrane, the fifth Earl (died 1725). He died unmarried at the age of sixteen.

On his death the line of the 2nd Earl failed and the titles passed to his first cousin once removed, Thomas Cochrane, the sixth Earl (died 1737). He was the son of William Cochrane (died 1717), second son of the aforementioned William Cochrane, Lord Cochrane (died 1679), eldest son of the 1st Earl. He was succeeded by his son William Cochrane, the seventh Earl (died 1758). He fought in the Seven Years' War and was killed at the Battle of Louisbourg on 9 July 1758.

On the death of the 7th Earl this line of the family also failed and the titles were inherited by his second cousin once removed, Thomas Cochrane, the eighth Earl (died 1778). He was the grandson of Colonel Sir John Cochrane (died 1707), second son of the 1st Earl. Before he became the 8th Earl, he sat as Member of Parliament (Whig) for Renfrewshire between 1722 and 1727. After his death, the titles passed to his son Archibald Cochrane, the ninth Earl (died 1831).

The 9th Earl was a scientist and inventor; among his inventions was the first industrial technique for extracting coal tar. Besides the direct applications of coal tar, the gaseous byproducts of Earl Dundonald's tar works were later used by engineer William Murdoch to invent gas lighting in the 1790s. However, none of the Earl's inventions brought him much money—for instance, the Navy, the most likely customer for the coal tar, had put off buying it in quantity until after the patent on it had expired—and having lost the family estates (he had used them as collateral for the tar works), he died deep in debt in a slum in Paris in 1831. The titles then passed to his son Thomas Cochrane, the tenth Earl (died 1860).

The 10th Earl was a noted naval commander and fought in the Napoleonic Wars. Before inheriting the peerage titles, he also sat as a Member of Parliament. However, he was later imprisoned on a false charge of fraud and expelled from the Navy and Parliament. After release he went abroad and commanded the Chilean, Peruvian, Brazilian and Greek navies with distinction. In 1824, the 10th Earl was created Marquess of Maranhão (Marquês do Maranhão) in the Peerage of Brazil, by Emperor Pedro I. He was also awarded the accompanying coat of arms. The titles of nobility in Brazil were not hereditary. In 1832 he was reinstated in the Royal Navy and received a royal pardon. He was succeeded by his son Thomas Cochrane, the eleventh Earl (died 1885).

The 11th Earl sat in the House of Lords as a Scottish Representative Peer from 1879 to 1885. On his death the titles passed to his eldest son Douglas Cochrane, the twelfth Earl (died 1935). He was commissioned in the Life Guards, a Lieutenant-General in the British Army, a Scottish Representative Peer from 1886 to 1922, and a General Officer Commanding the Canadian Forces, whence he left us with the admonition:

Men of Canada! Keep both hands on the Union Jack

He married Winifred Bamford-Hesketh. When he died the titles passed to his son Thomas Hesketh Cochrane, the thirteenth Earl (died 1958).

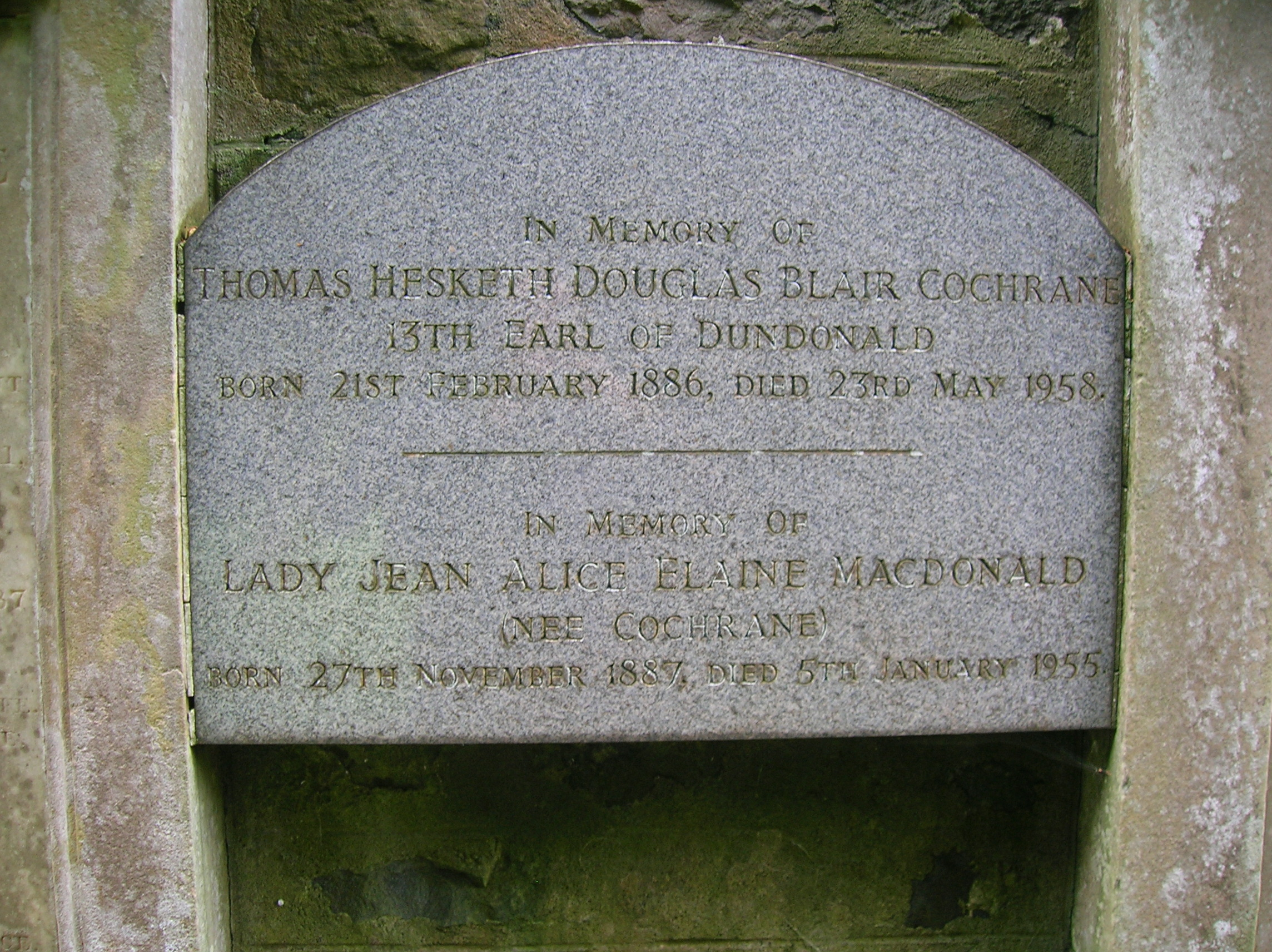
Memorial to the 13th earl at Dundonald Parish Church.

He was a Scottish Representative Peer in the House of Lords from 1941 to 1955. He never married and was succeeded by his nephew Iain Douglas Cochrane, the fourteenth Earl (died 1986). He was the son of Douglas Robert Hesketh Roger Cochrane, second son of the twelfth Earl. The 14th Earl was a major in the Black Watch. As of 2017 the titles are held by his only son Ian Alexander Cochrane, the fifteenth Earl, who succeeded in 1986.

Several other members of the Cochrane family have also gained distinction: Sir Alexander Cochrane, sixth son of the 8th Earl, was an admiral in the Royal Navy. His son Sir Thomas John Cochrane was also a naval commander and served as Governor of Newfoundland. His son Alexander Cochrane-Baillie was a Conservative politician and was created Baron Lamington in 1880 (see this title for more information). William Francis Dundonald Cochrane (1847–1927), a brigadier-general in the Army, was the son of William Marshall Cochrane, a colonel in the Army, son of Major the William Erskine Cochrane, third son of the ninth Earl. Archibald Cochrane, fourth son of the 9th Earl, was a captain in the Royal Navy. His grandson Basil Edward Cochrane was a vice-admiral in the Royal Navy. He was the father of Archibald Cochrane (1847–1952) and Sir Edward Owen Cochrane (1881–1972), both rear-admirals in the Royal Navy. John Dundas Cochrane, another younger son of the ninth Earl, was a traveller and explorer. Thomas Cochrane, second son of the 11th Earl, was a politician and was created Baron Cochrane of Cults in 1919 (see this title for more information).

The earldom is named after Dundonald, South Ayrshire (see Dundonald Castle).

The Earl of Dundonald is the Scottish clan chief of Clan Cochrane.

The family seats are Lochnell Castle, near Benderloch, Argyll and Bute, and Beacon Hall, near Cranbrook, Kent.

== Earls of Dundonald (1669) ==
- William Cochrane, 1st Earl of Dundonald (d. 1685)
- John Cochrane, 2nd Earl of Dundonald (c. 1660–1690)
- William Cochrane, 3rd Earl of Dundonald (1686–1705)
- John Cochrane, 4th Earl of Dundonald (1687–1720)
- William Cochrane, 5th Earl of Dundonald (1708–1725)
- Thomas Cochrane, 6th Earl of Dundonald (1702–1737)
- William Cochrane, 7th Earl of Dundonald (1729–1758)
- Thomas Cochrane, 8th Earl of Dundonald (1691–1778)
- Archibald Cochrane, 9th Earl of Dundonald (1749–1831)
- Thomas Cochrane, 10th Earl of Dundonald, Marquess of Maranhão (1775–1860)
- Thomas Barnes Cochrane, 11th Earl of Dundonald (1814–1885)
- Douglas Mackinnon Baillie Hamilton Cochrane, 12th Earl of Dundonald (1852–1935)
- Thomas Hesketh Douglas Blair Cochrane, 13th Earl of Dundonald (1886–1958)
- Iain Douglas Leonard Cochrane, 14th Earl of Dundonald (1918–1986)
- Iain Alexander Douglas Blair Cochrane, 15th Earl of Dundonald (b. 1961)

The heir apparent is the present holder's eldest son Archibald Iain Thomas Blair Cochrane, Lord Cochrane (b. 1991).

== Arms ==
Arms of Cochrane of Dundonald

Earl of Dundonald's Coat of arms.

Arms of Cochrane of Dundonald quartered with Blair

Earl of Dundonald's Coat of arms (version quartered with Blair)

Coat of arms of the Marquess of Maranhão.

== See also ==
- Auchans Castle, Ayrshire
- Baron Cochrane of Cults
- Baron Lamington
- Clan Cochrane
- Cochrane (surname)
- Dundonald, South Ayrshire
- Duke E.F. Wasson
