= Lochnell Castle =

16th-century castle

- near Benderloch, Argyll and Bute, Scotland
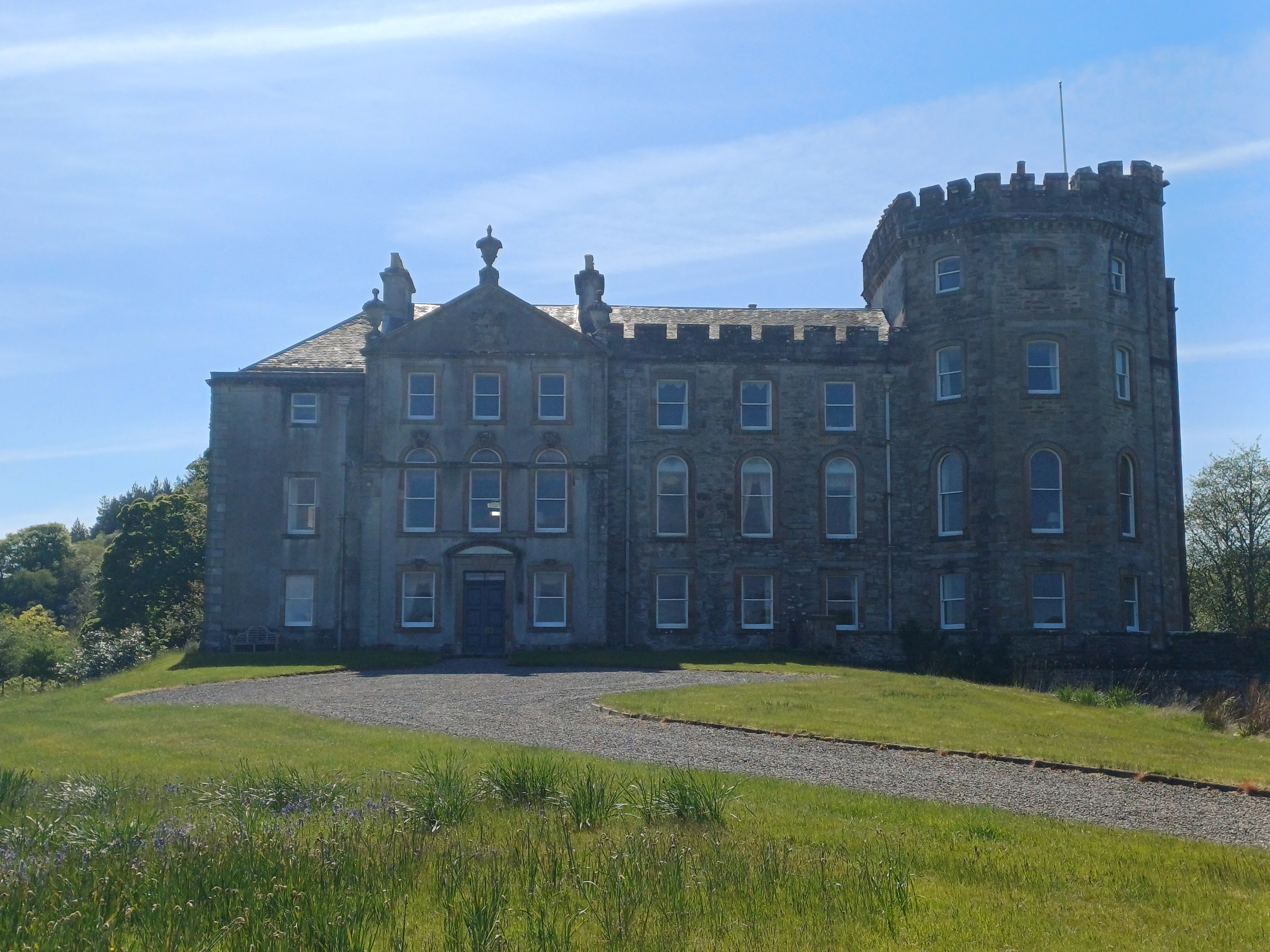
- Lochnell Castle in 2025

Site information
- Controlled by: Earl of Dundonald
- Open to the public: Private Residence

Location
- Shown within Argyll and Bute
- Coordinates: 56.495263°N 5.436059°W

Site history
- Built: 1587
- Built by: Archibald Campbell
- In use: 16th Century to Present
- Events

Site notes
- Website: www.lochnell.co.uk

Listed Building – Category A
- Designated: 20 July 1971
- Reference no.: LB4716

Lochnell Castle (also known as Lochnell House) is a 16th Century Castle that sits on Ardmucknish Bay near Benderloch, in Scotland.

== History ==
=== Before the Castle ===
The earliest recorded occupation on the current site dates back to around the 6th century with a Saint Columba cell. Parts of this cell are still visible in the under-croft of the Chapel and under the main part of the castle. The medieval chapel, to the rear of the castle, was built in the 15th century.

=== The Castle ===
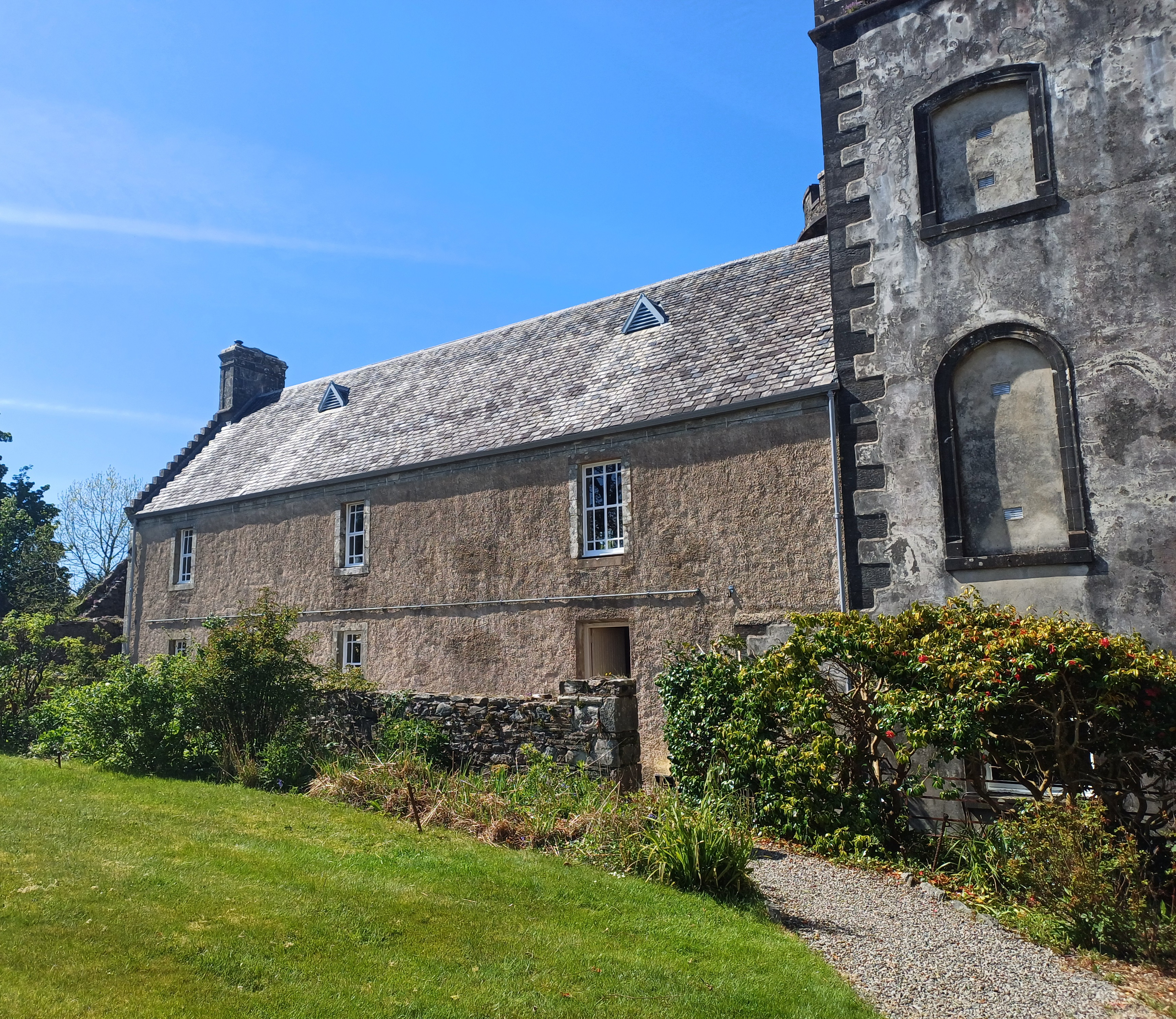
Medieval Chapel

Lochnell Castle was built by Archibald Campbell the 5th Earl of Argyll in 1587. The house was built by Sir Duncan Campbell, 7th of Lochnell. The castle served as the family seat of Clan Campbell of Lochnell.

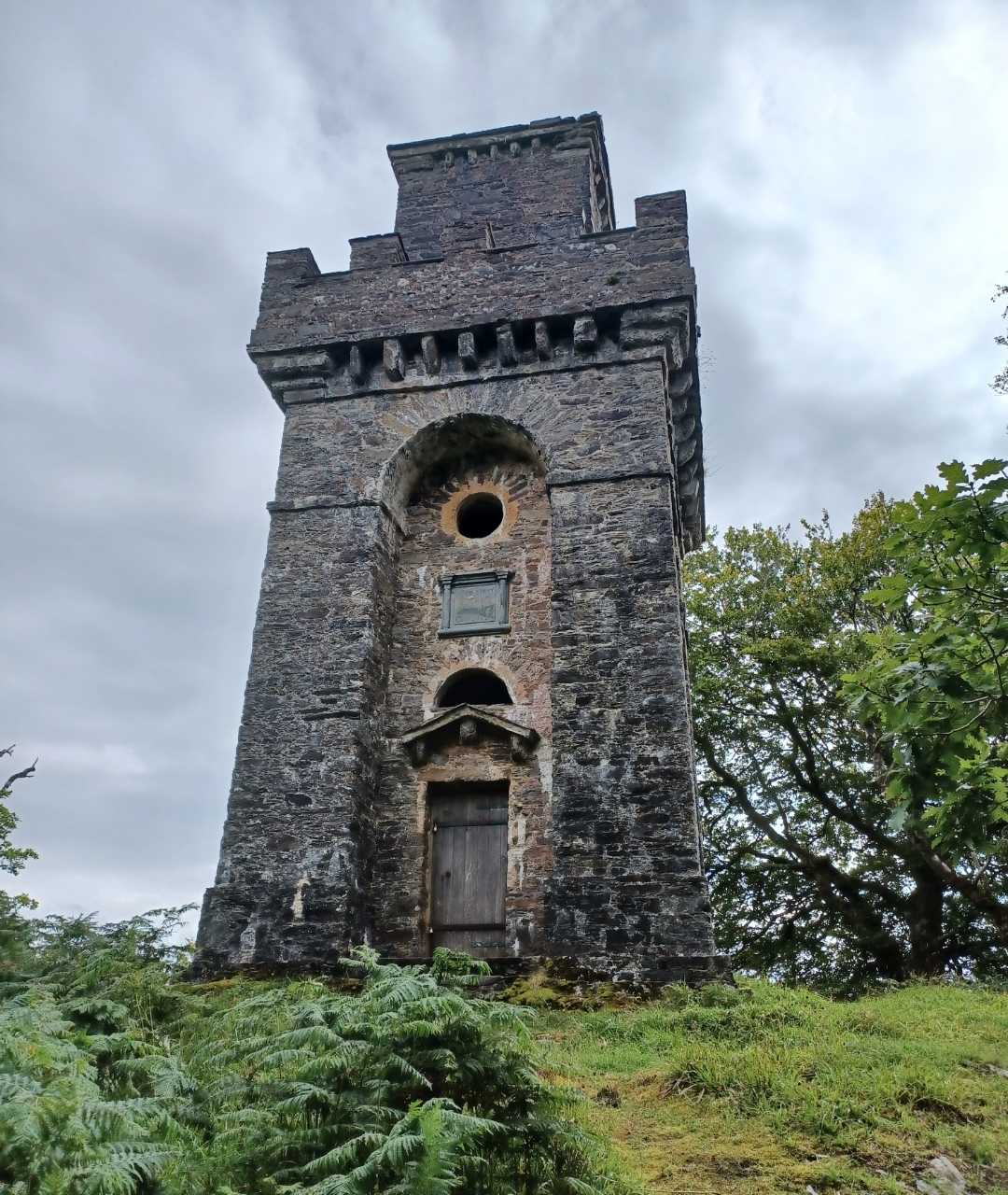
Lady Margaret's Tower

Between around 1737 and 1739, the castle was altered and enlarged by the erection of a new dwelling-house to the south-east of this earlier main building. In around 1818-20, the castle was remodelled again into a Georgian style manor house. General Campbell reportedly spent £15,000 on an enlargement of the manor house. In the 18th Century, a folly named Lady Margaret's Tower was constructed on the top of a nearby hill on the Lochnell Castle estate grounds. The castle was damaged by a fire in the second half of the 19th century, but has since been mostly restored. There is conflicting information about the dates of the fire with Cochrane Heritage stating that there was a fire in either 1859 or 1885, whilst James Miller stated in his 1877 book that there was a fire in 1850. The Ancient Yew Group states that there were at least two fires at Lochnell Castle but there could have also been a third fire.

In 1912, the estate was purchased by Thomas Cochrane, 13th Earl of Dundonald. The Cochrane family sold the estate in 1949, following its requisition as a brigade headquarters during World War II before the family repurchased the estate in 1962. The Castle is now a family seat of Clan Cochrane and the Earl of Dundonald.

=== Bernera Island Yew tree staircase ===
Lochnell Castle is situated near Bernera Island. In the 6th century, Bernera was settled by monks of the Irish Culdee church under the leadership of St. Moluag. Saint Columba used the island as a private place for retreat, meditation and prayer, and may have preached under (and possibly planted) a vast yew tree. It is reported that this tree was felled by Sir Duncan Campbell of Lochnell prior to 1770. The wood from this yew tree was turned into a staircase for Lochnell Castle and it survived at least two fires at the castle.

== Contemporary ==
The castle remains a private residence and is not open to the public. Today, the castle now serves as a wedding venue. Due to Thomas Cochrane's association with Chile, the castle also serves as an Honorary Consulate of Chile. The Castle is a Category A Listed Building.

== Ghostlore ==
According to local legend, there is a Brownie haunting the castle with the sound of supernatural music reportedly being heard by several people.
