= Thomas Cochrane =

Thomas Cochrane may refer to:

- Thomas Cochrane, 8th Earl of Dundonald (1691–1778), Scottish nobleman and politician
- Thomas Cochrane, 6th Earl of Dundonald (1702–1737), Scottish peer
- Thomas Cochrane, 10th Earl of Dundonald (1775–1860), British naval officer and radical politician, Marquess of Maranhão in Brazil
- Thomas Cochrane, 11th Earl of Dundonald (1814–1885), Scottish nobleman, son of the above, father of the 1st Baron Cochrane of Cults
- Thomas Cochrane, 13th Earl of Dundonald (1886–1958), British Army officer, representative peer
- Thomas Cochrane, 1st Baron Cochrane of Cults (1857–1951), Scottish Unionist politician and nobleman
- Thomas (Robert) Cochrane (died 1482), favourite of King James III of Scotland
- Thomas John Cochrane (1789–1872), Scottish naval officer of the English Navy and first governor of the colony of Newfoundland
- Thomas Cochrane (doctor) (1866–1953), Scottish medical missionary to China
- Tom Cochrane (born 1953), Canadian singer-songwriter and musician

== See also ==
- Thomas Cochran (disambiguation)
