= Crawford Priory =

- Crawford Priory from the south in 2008

- Location within Fife
- Former names: Crawford Lodge
- Alternative names: Crawfurd Priory

General information
- Type: Mansion house
- Architectural style: Gothic Revival
- Location: Fife, Scotland
- Coordinates: 56°17′21.91″N 3°3′20.22″W
- Owner: Baron Cochrane of Cults via Crawford Priory Limited

Design and construction
- Architects: David Hamilton (1809-1810); James Gillespie Graham (1810-1813); William Little (1871 alterations); Rodolph Fielding (1871 alterations); Reginald Fairlie (1920 alterations)
- Other designers: Thomas Bonnar (interior decoration); William Edington (stained glass)

Listed Building – Category B
- Official name: Crawford Priory
- Designated: 1 March 1984
- Reference no.: LB2567

Crawford Priory is a ruined estate house in Fife, Scotland, and former family seat. It lies on the eponymous Crawford Priory Estate between the villages of Pitlessie and Springfield, and about 3 miles (5 km) south west of the nearest town, Cupar.

Originally built as Crawford Lodge by the 21st Earl of Crawford in 1758, Lady Mary Lindsay Crawford commissioned enlargements and alterations in a 'gothic ecclesiastical' style from David Hamilton and James Gillespie Graham in the early 19th century, gaining it its ultimate grandeur and priory name. Despite subsequent improvements, the property was eventually abandoned in 1968 after becoming too difficult to maintain, with attempts at demolition or redevelopment unsuccessful.

A widely-praised early example of gothic revival architecture, Crawford Priory is of category A class, but holds only category B listed building status due to its ruinous state.

== History ==
After the destruction of Kilbirnie Castle by fire in 1757, George Lindsay-Crawford, 21st Earl of Crawford, 5th Earl of Lindsay, relocated his family first to Bourtreehill House, then constructed Crawford Lodge near the old Lindsay family residence of Struthers in 1758. Upon his death in 1781, he was succeeded by his eldest son, George Lindsay-Crawford, 22nd Earl of Crawford who died unmarried in 1808. Ending the male succession line of the John Lindsay, 17th Earl of Crawford, 1st Earl of Lindsay, his titles passed to the male heirs of David Lindsay, 9th Earl of Crawford under the regrant of 1642, while the Crawford-Lindsay estates, including Crawford Lodge, passed to his only surviving sibling, Lady Mary Lindsay Crawford.

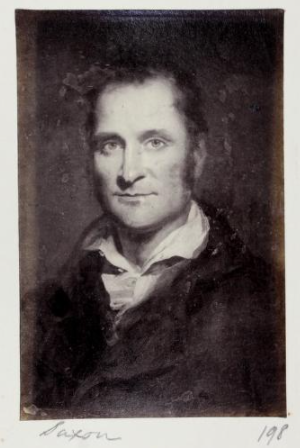
Architect David Hamilton

Under Lady Crawford, significant enlargements were made to Crawford Lodge between 1809 and 1813. Writing to Hugh Hamilton of Pinmore House on 8 October 1809, she expresses her wish to enlist renowned architect David Hamilton with the assistance of James Cleland, considering the existing house as 'raised under bad and awful auspices.' On board, Hamilton proposed a gothic hall, apparently intended to resemble Dunblane Cathedral and reflect Lady Crawford's 'ample and noble descent.'

Although Lady Crawford initially described Hamilton's ideas as 'superb,' she quickly became unhappy with his lack of communication, and is said to 'regret' employing both Hamilton and Cleland by 10 May 1810. By 15 November 1810, Hamilton was replaced by James Gillespie Graham, who took inspiration from Rossie Priory and his own Ross Priory in his contribution to the design. Lady Crawford herself also had direct input, creating sketches for the lobby at the west end of the dining room.

Lady Crawford's alterations were completed by 1813, with the final 'castle' element coming mainly from Hamilton, and the 'priory' element from Gillespie Graham. The new house was dominated by a grand hall, 53.5 feet (16.3 m) in length and 29 feet (8.8 m) wide. This part of the property alone cost £1500 (around £95,000 in 2023) to complete. In total, there were fifty rooms. Stained glass was supplied by William Raphael Eginton. Circa 1816, he described it thus:

Window, 19 Feet by 14, containing a figure, full length, of Ignatius Loyola after Vandyke, Gothic Canopies, large Heraldic Bearings, with Supporters, Crests, &c. the whole on a ground composed of Badges of the Family.

Until her death on 21 November 1833, Lady Crawford was greatly attached to Crawford Priory and the surrounding estate. She lived 'in almost entire seclusion' within the grounds, becoming familiar with animals both wild and tame. Her funeral service, too, was held in the grand hall on 2 December 1833, before she was laid to rest with her brother in the family mausoleum.

After Lady Crawford's death, the building lay unoccupied, and deteriorated until George Boyle, 6th Earl of Glasgow, to whom Lady Crawford's estates fell, commissioned William Little to restore and significantly alter the building in 1871. Additions included a 115-foot (35 m) gothic tower and new chapel design for the east of the building, as well as a complete interior renovation and a carriage porch.

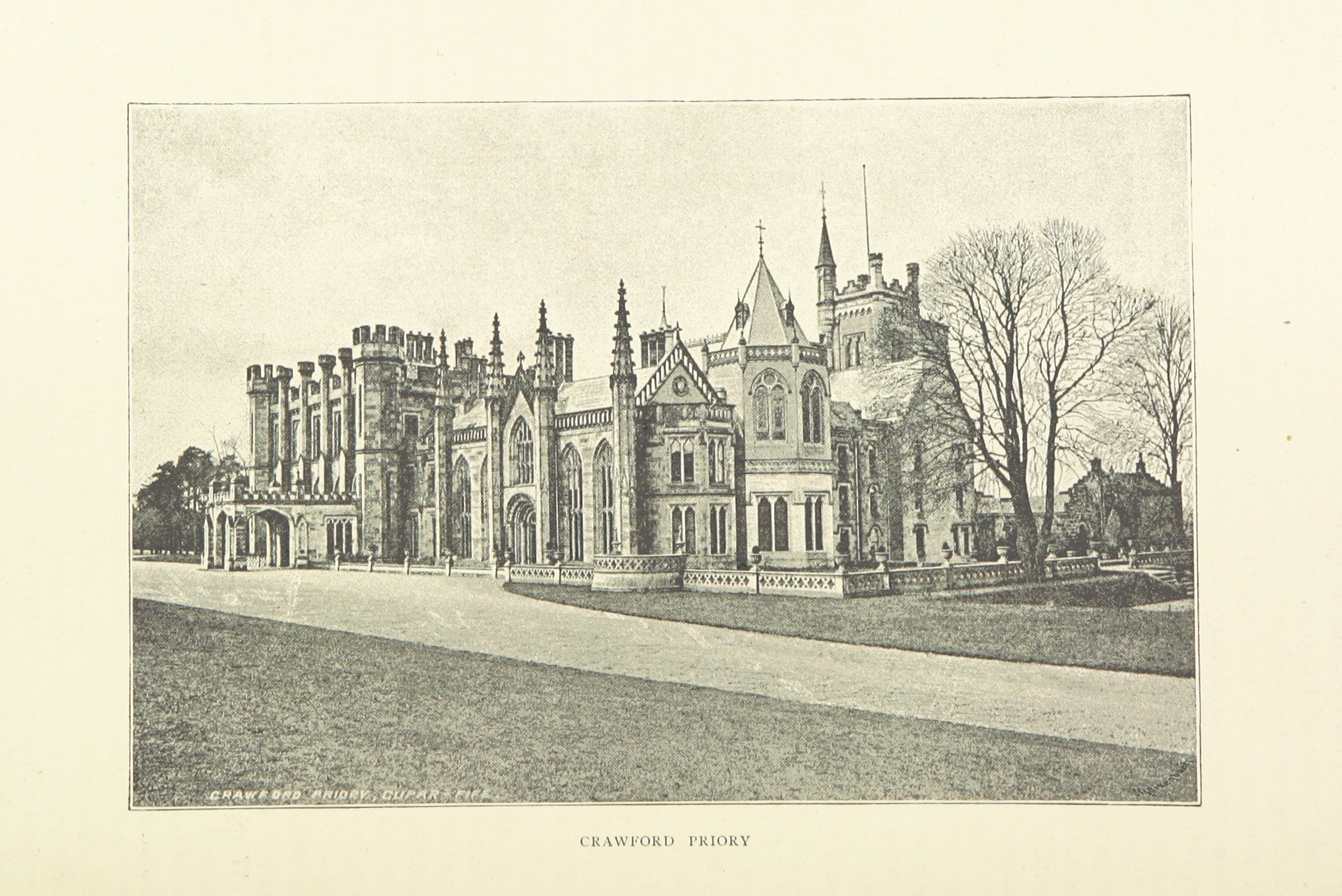
Crawford Priory in the late 19th century, after alterations by Boyle

Boyle died with a large amount of debt owing to expensive habits, and David Boyle, 7th Earl of Glasgow was forced to sell off his estates to retain the family seat at Kelburn Castle. The house passed to politician Thomas Cochrane, the son-in-law of the 6th Earl, who later became 1st Baron Cochrane of Cults in 1919 and adopted the house as the family seat. The outlying estate of Priestfield was sold around this time.

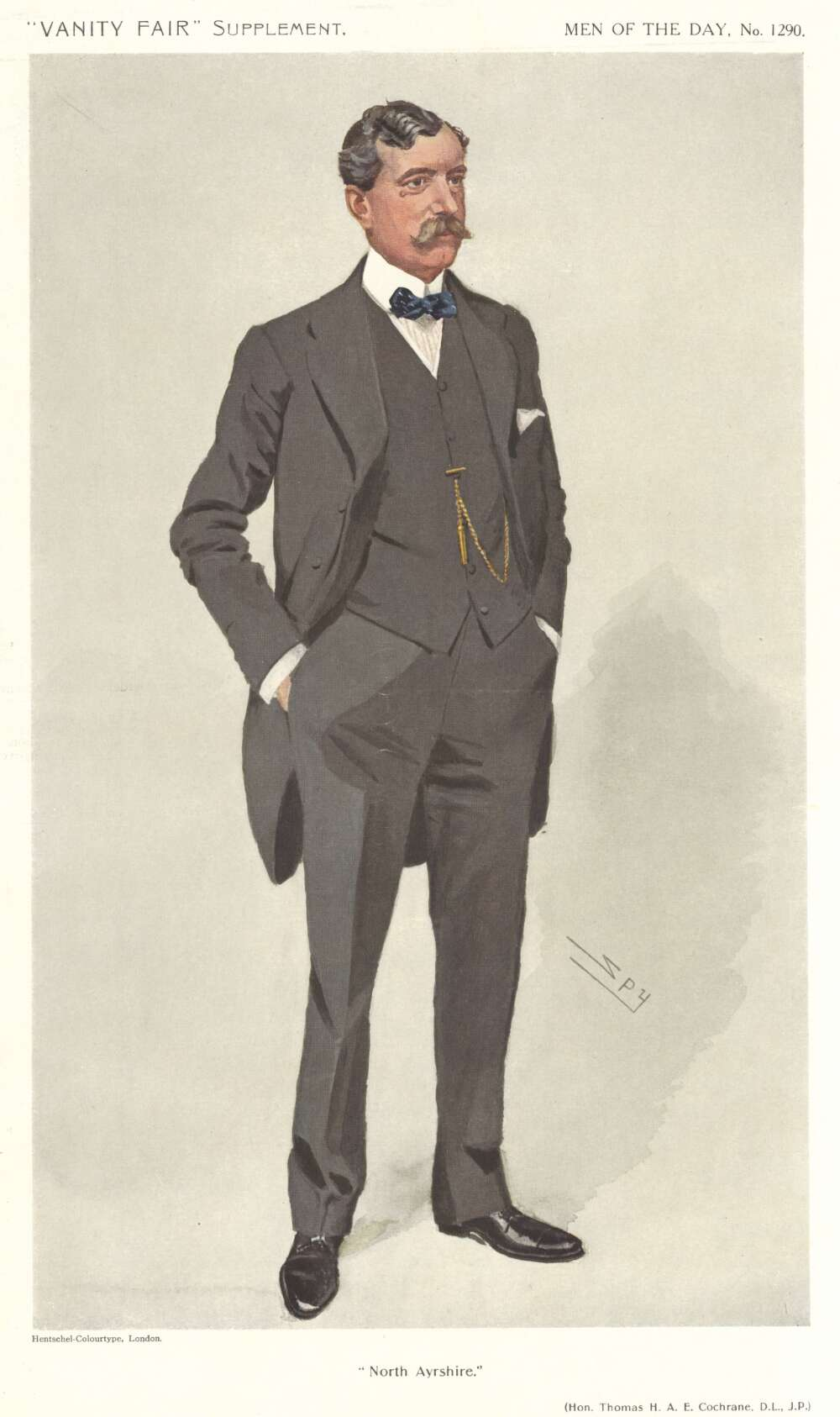
1st Baron Cochrane of Cults

The 1st Baron commissioned further remodelling from Reginald Fairlie in 1920, adding wood pannelling and moving Boyle's porte cochre. Crawford Priory then passed to Thomas Cochrane, 2nd Baron of Cults who occupied it until his death in 1968, after which it fell into disuse primarily due to the large cost involved in maintaining such an old and large building. Prior to abandonment, dry rot was noted as a particular issue. The family seat of the Barons is now 500m south west at Cults House.

Throughout the 1990s, as the building fell further into disrepair, appeals were made both to demolish and restore Crawford Priory. In November 1991, an application to remove part of the roof was accepted, with some sections retained to protect particularly sensitive areas. Later in December 1991, another application was accepted to turn the area surrounding the building into a golf course subject to its retention, with a British Association of Golf Course Architects member commissioned. However, in 1995, the remaining building was gutted by fire and became structurally unstable. The owners, still Barons Cochrane of Cults via Crawford Priory Limited, made continued efforts for its demolition, however there were numerous proposals from planners and the community to salvage the building.

Historic Scotland and the owners eventually came to an agreement in March 1997 that no application for the building's demolition will be made until there had been an attempt to market the building. In December 1997, the ruin along with 1.5 acres of land was put on the market for £80,000 with various conditions. These conditions were such that many believed the marketing to be insincere, despite the approval of Historic Scotland. No responses were received to the marketing offer and subsequent demolition requests were rejected. The building was added to the Buildings at Risk Register for Scotland in 1994, who report little change since 1997 aside from further deterioration at the last inspection of 2019.

== Architecture ==
At its height, Crawford Priory was described as 'the finest house in the populous and wealthy county which it adorns, if not also in the whole of Scotland.' Historic Environment Scotland's decision to grant the building category B listed building status, with the acknowledgement that it was architecturally of category A status when in better condition, supports this assessment of its architectural merit.

It is an earlier example of gothic revival architecture, incorporating octagonal turrets, large windows, pinnacles, arches, and other features, producing an appearance almost like that of a gothic priory from the east, hence its name. There can be seen to be two main parts to the white sandstone building: the large, square section to the south and west, which is described as resembling a 'tower' or 'castle' with its octagonal turrets; and the more complex section to the north and east, thought to incorporate the original lodge and better resembling a gothic church.

Internally, Crawford Priory continued to incorporate the gothic theme prior to its gutting, with intricate fan vaulting and a surviving cast iron spiral staircase. The grand hall occupied almost the entirety of the part of the building resembling a castle, featuring large stained glass windows created by William Edington with an apostle and the family arms, and a ceiling by Thomas Bonnar. The rest of the house contained numerous public rooms with fine art and decoration.

== Estate ==
=== Garden ===
Around 0.5 miles (0.80 km) south-west of the house lay its garden. Now also ruined, they once occupied an area of around seven acres and contained 615 square yards (514 m^{2}) of glass on the various greenhouses. These greenhouses included, the Large Range, the Double Vinery, the Green House, and the Pine Pit. Alongside these stood a number of fruit trees and other plants.

=== Mausoleum ===
The Crawford Family Mausoleum lies on the north-west face of Walton Hill in Lady Mary's Wood, around 0.8 miles (1.3 km) south-east of Crawford Priory. Taking a classical, cruciform-plan form of polished ashlar, and originally surrounded by Roman Doric columns, it is thought to have been built around the same time as the house itself in 1758. An Iron-Age hill-fort previously occupied the same site. The mausoleum is now largely dilapidated, having been subject to aging, vegetation growth, and vandalism. This has landed it a place on the Buildings at Risk Register, and its historical importance status as a category B listed building.

George Lindsay-Crawford, 21st Earl of Crawford, the presumed commissioner, was the first to be interred in the mausoleum upon his death in 1781. His son, George Lindsay-Crawford, 22nd Earl of Crawford, was also laid to alongside him when he died in 1808. Ending this line of the Crawfords, Lady Mary Lindsay Crawford was the last to be interred in 1833. After this, the crypt was sealed, though has since been breached and vandalised.

Images of the Crawford Priory Estate
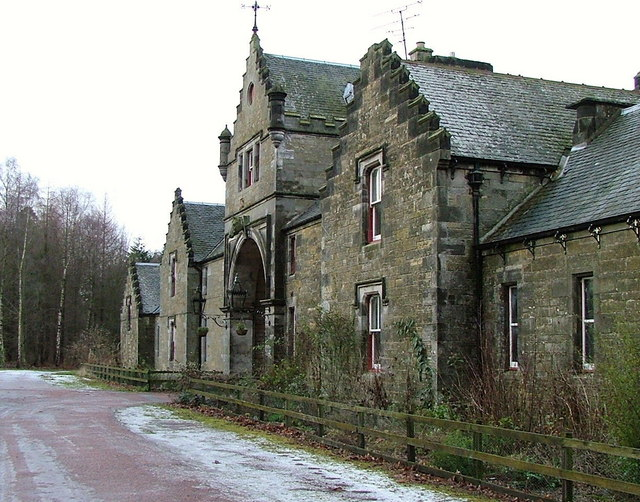
Crawford Priory stables, now converted into 5 flats

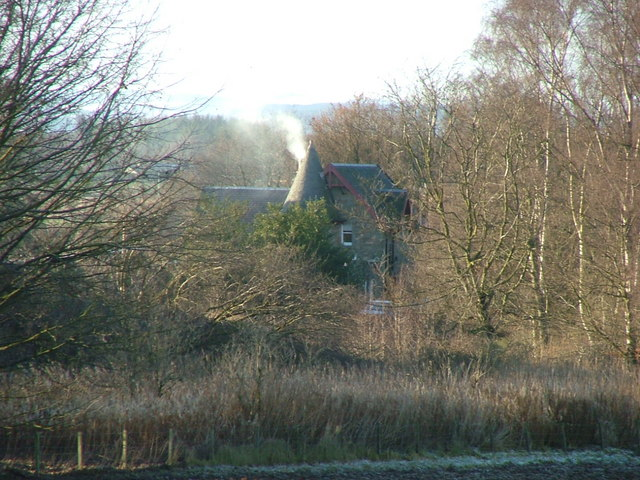
Turret House, at the north west of the estate

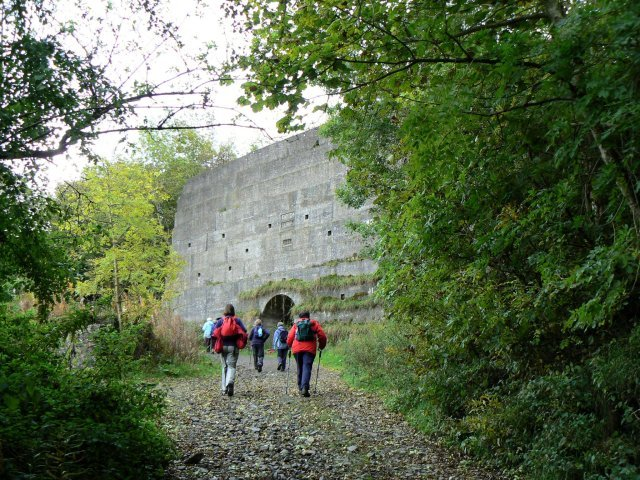
One of the lime kilns on Cults Hill

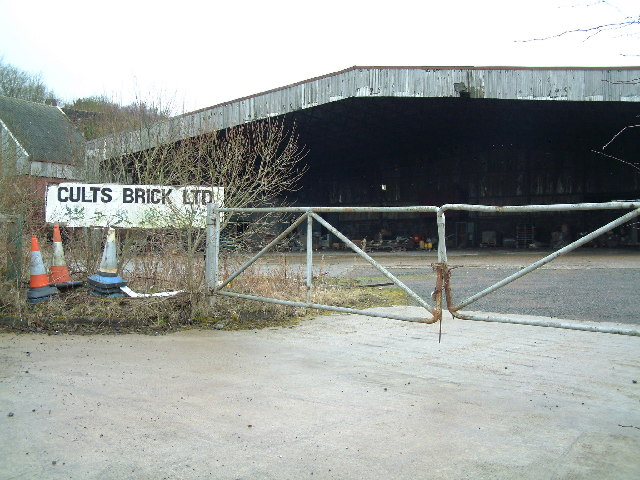
Cults brick and lime works, formerly owned by the estate

== See also ==
- List of listed buildings in Cults, Fife
