= Priestfield =

Priestfield may refer to:

- Priestfield, Wolverhampton, an area of Wolverhampton, UK
- Priestfield tram stop on the Midland Metro line
- Priestfield railway station on the Oxford, Worcester and Wolverhampton Railway, open from 1854 to 1972
- Priestfield, Herefordshire, a village
- Priestfield, Medway, an area of Rochester, Kent granted by King Ethelbert of Kent to Rochester Cathedral
- Priestfield Stadium, the home of Gillingham FC, Kent, UK
- Priestfield House, a former country house in Fife, Scotland
- Prestonfield, Edinburgh, formerly Priestfield, the name retained in some institutions and street names

== See also ==
- Priestfields, a neighbourhood of Middlesbrough
