= Lady Grizel Louise Hamilton =

British aristocrat (1880–1976)

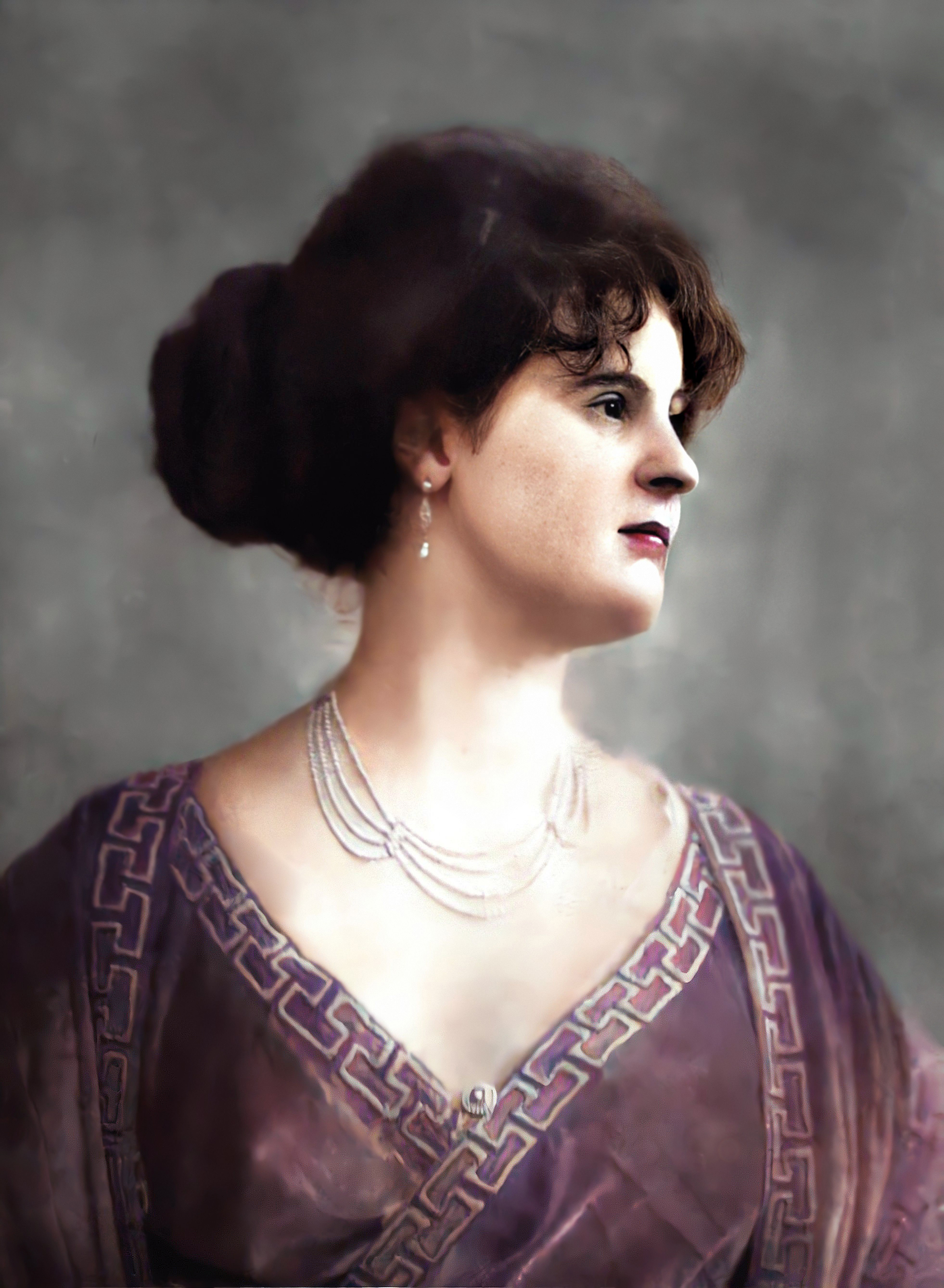
- Born: Hon. Grizel Winifred Louise Cochrane; 14 May 1880; St George Hanover Square, London
- Died: 5 December 1976 (aged 96); Bury St Edmunds, Suffolk
- Known for: Hunting
- Spouse(s): Lt.-Col. Hon. Ralph Gerard Alexander Hamilton, Master of Belhaven (m.1904-1918; Killed in action)
- Parents: Douglas Cochrane, 12th Earl of Dundonald (father); Winifred Bamford-Hesketh (mother)

Lady Grizel Winifred Louise Hamilton (née Cochrane; 14 May 1880 – 5 December 1976) was a Welsh and Scottish aristocrat.

She was the daughter of Winifred, Countess of Dundonald and Douglas Cochrane, 12th Earl of Dundonald and the wife of Lt.-Col. Hon. Ralph Gerard Alexander Hamilton, Master of Belhaven, who died in action during the First World War, she was a famous huntress.

== International travel ==
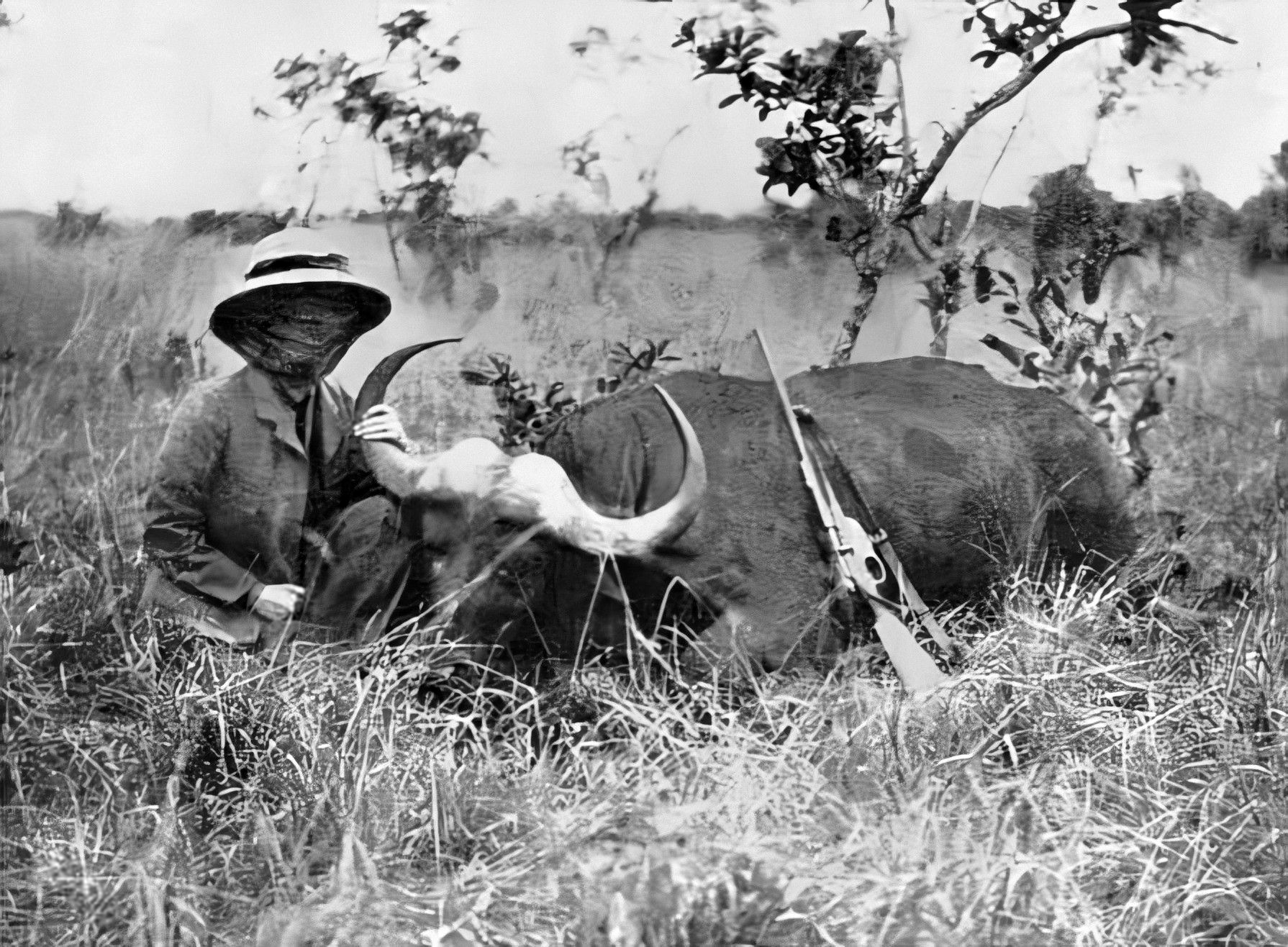
Grizel Hamilton kneels next to a Cape buffalo

Along with her husband, she was a keen huntress. She often traveled to Kenya, Africa, to embark on her big game hunting. Some of the animals she killed were: hippopotamus, wildebeest, leopard, rhinoceros, waterbuck, cape buffalo; her hunts were extensively covered in popular magazines and newspaper articles.

== Personal life ==
Born in St George Hanover Square, London, she spent most of her childhood at Gwrych Castle, Abergele, Wales.

On 1 March 1904 (which landed on Saint David's Day), Grizel married Ralph Gerard Alexander Hamilton, Master of Belhaven at Henry VII Chapel, London. Their marriage was the first ever to be held at the venue during Lent, breaking a long-held tradition.

The service was arranged by her mother, Winifred, Countess of Dundonald. The event was kept small due to the chapel's limited space and quiet due to it being Lent, the altar was decorated with annunciation lilies. Hanging over the stall was the naval flag of Thomas Cochrane, 10th Earl of Dundonald (her great-grandfather), on the flag rested a wreath tied with a white satin bow. Her father was absent from her wedding due to his military duties in Canada, in lieu of this, her uncle Thomas Cochrane walked her down the aisle and then her mother gave her away.

In the last year of the First World War, Grizel became a widow when her husband was killed in action on Easter Sunday by a shell on the Western front, this affected her greatly, as she never remarried.

In 1933, she was invited to open a £30,000 (~£1.7 million in 2021 after inflation) swimming pool at Rhos-on-Sea, Wales.
