= Lord Cochrane =

Lord Cochrane can refer to:

- William Cochrane, 1st Earl of Dundonald who prior to receiving the earldom was created Baron Cochrane of Dundonald
- Thomas Cochrane, 10th Earl of Dundonald (1775–1860), British naval officer
- Earl of Dundonald has a subsidiary of Baron Cochrane of Paisley and Ochiltree
- Baron Cochrane of Cults of Crawford Priory in the County of Fife. Created in 1919, it is a title in the Peerage of the United Kingdom.
