= Cults, Fife =

Hamlet and civil parish in Fife, Scotland

Cults
- Parish and Hamlet
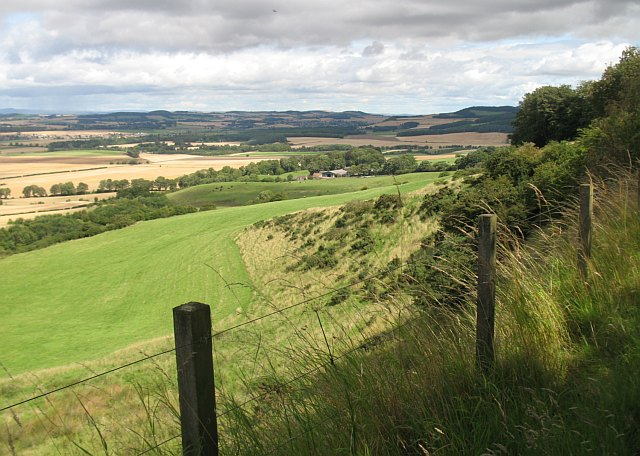
- Overlooking the farmland of Cults from Cults Hill

- Location within Fife
- OS grid reference: NO352092
- Council area: Fife
- Lieutenancy area: Fife
- Country: Scotland
- Sovereign state: United Kingdom
- Post town: CUPAR
- Postcode district: KY15
- Police: Scotland
- Fire: Scottish
- Ambulance: Scottish
- UK Parliament: North East Fife
- Scottish Parliament: North East Fife

Cults is a small parish and hamlet close to the centre of the Kingdom of Fife, Scotland. It lies mainly in the Howe of Fife, and about 4 1/2 miles (7.2 km) south-west of the nearest town - Cupar. The parish is about 2 1/3 miles (3.8 km) long and 1 1/3 miles (2.1 km) wide.

The parish contains various villages, farms and hamlets including Cults, Pitlessie, Crossgates and Walton. The only archaeological site of any importance seems to be a fort on the western slope of Walton Hill.

Its name is derived from the Scottish Gaelic cùilt meaning a corner or recess.

== Notable residents ==
Cults' most well-known resident was Sir David Wilkie (1785–1841) born in Cults Church manse. His father was parish minister and while Wilkie lived in Cults, characters in the parish served as models for his paintings Pitlessie Fair (1804) and the Village Politicians (1806). Cults Kirk contains a handsome monument in marble, by Chantrey, erected by Wilkie in memory of his parents and another to his memory, erected by his sister in 1844.

== Notable landmarks ==
=== Houses ===
The parish contains the shell and estate of Crawford Priory, originally the seat of the Earl of Glasgow, and latterly Lord Cochrane of Cults.

The now-demolished Priestfield House, once the seat of the Martin Smith family, was nearby at Pitlessie.

=== Cults Kirk ===
Cults Kirk has lain in the centre of the parish at the Kirkton of Cults for at least 800 years and may predate Christianity. The current building was constructed in 1793 under the oversight of Sir David Wilkie's father, Rev. David Wilkie, and then extended in 1835. It consists of a rectangular sandstone structure with a narrow bell tower to the western side surrounded by a graveyard predating the church building. The session house lies directly to the west of the kirk and predates the current building. The manse, to the southwest, is now a private residence.

The kirk became part of a congregation along with Kettle church in 1963, before this combined with the churches of Ladybank and Collessie to form the Howe of Fife Parish Church congregation in 1983.

The Church of Scotland sold Cults Kirk to a private buyer in 2021.

== Gallery ==
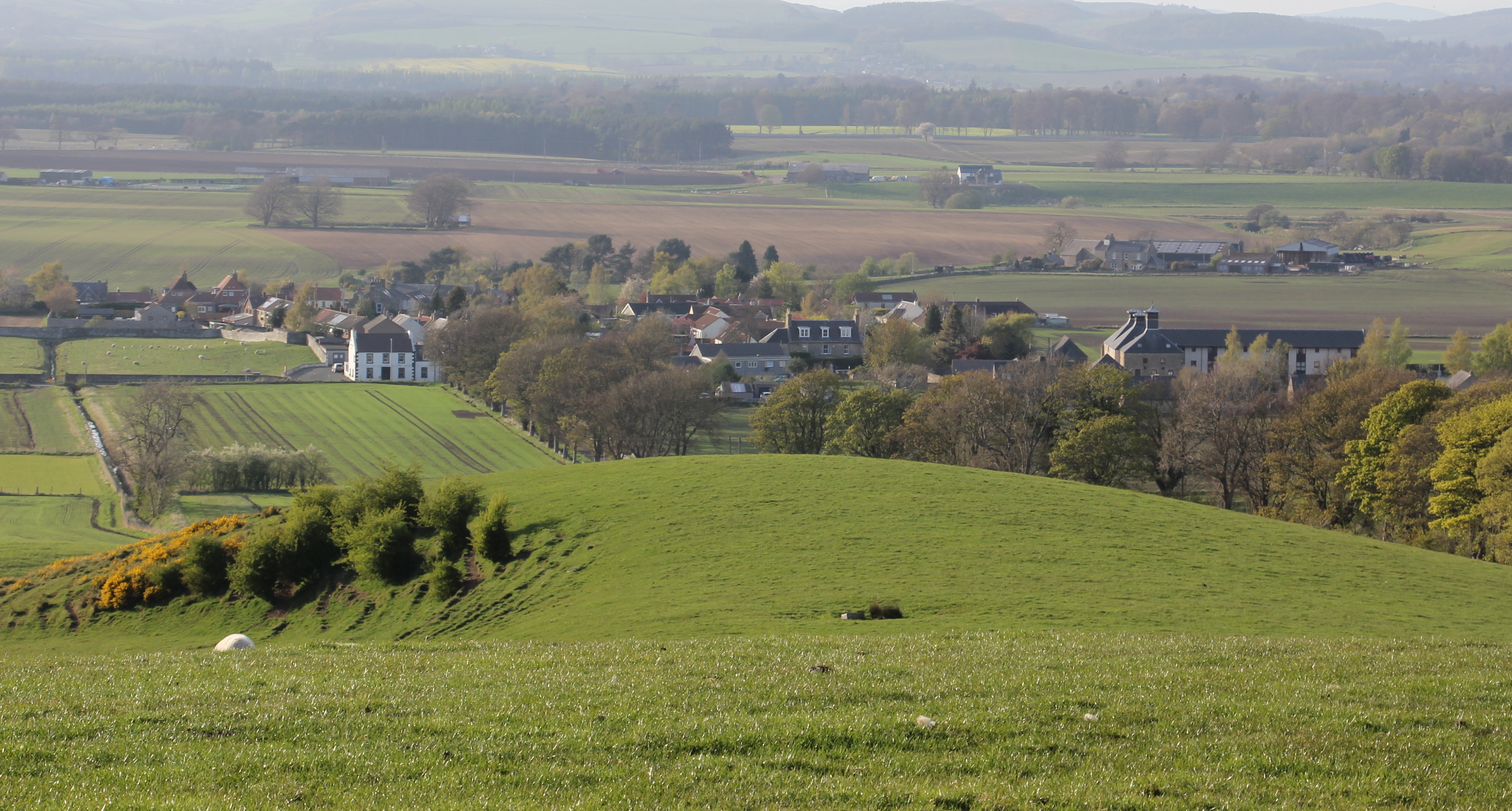
Pitlessie, the largest settlement in Cults, as seen from Cults Hill

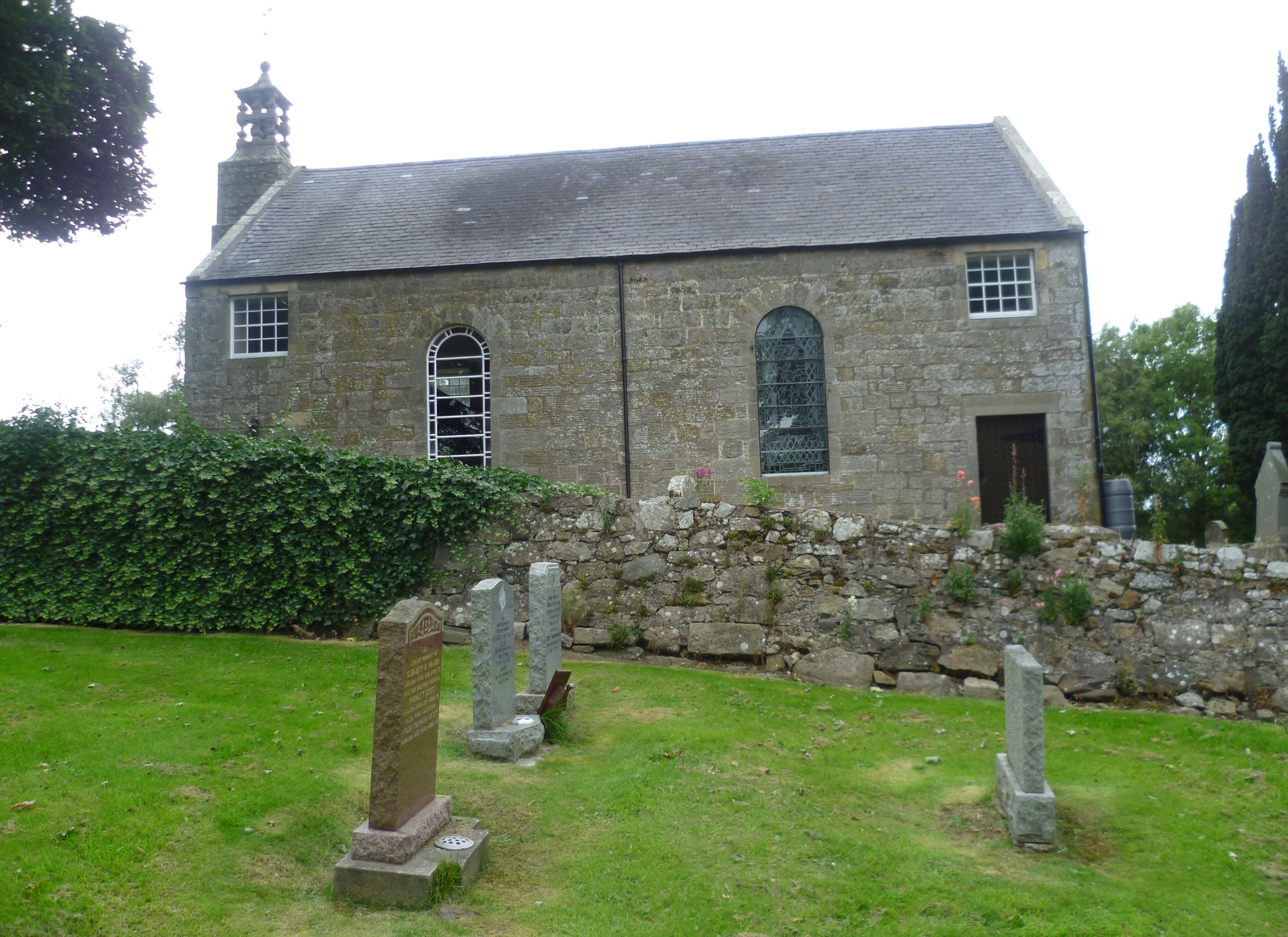
Cults Kirk, in the Kirkton of Cults

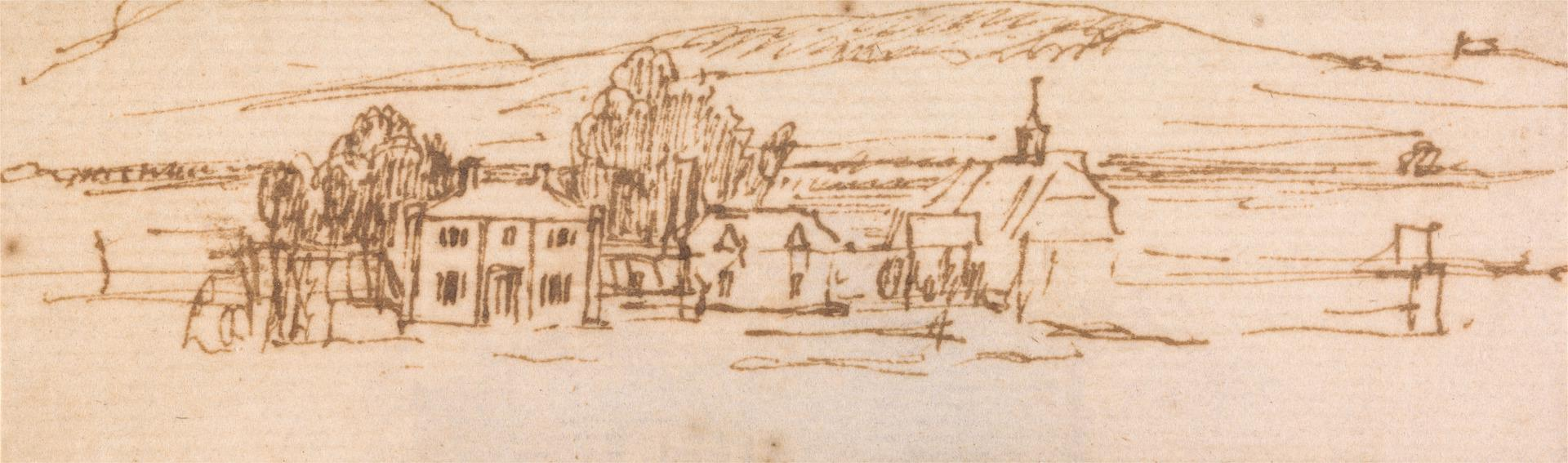
David Wilkie's interpretation of the Kirkton of Cults

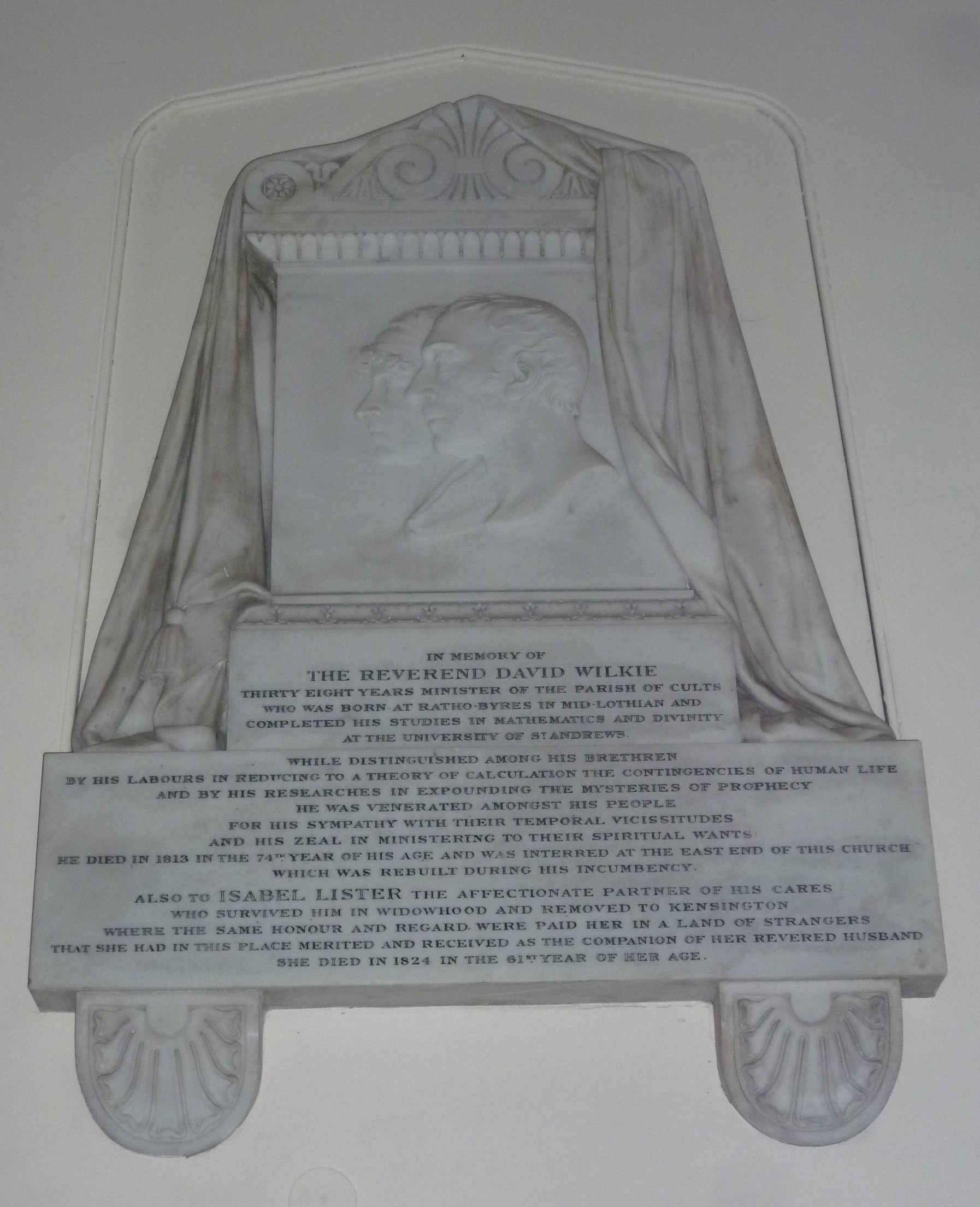
Memorial to the Rev. David Wilkie and his spouse Isabel Lister
