= Winifred Cochrane, Countess of Dundonald =

Welsh countess (1859–1924)

The Right Honourable The Countess of Dundonald
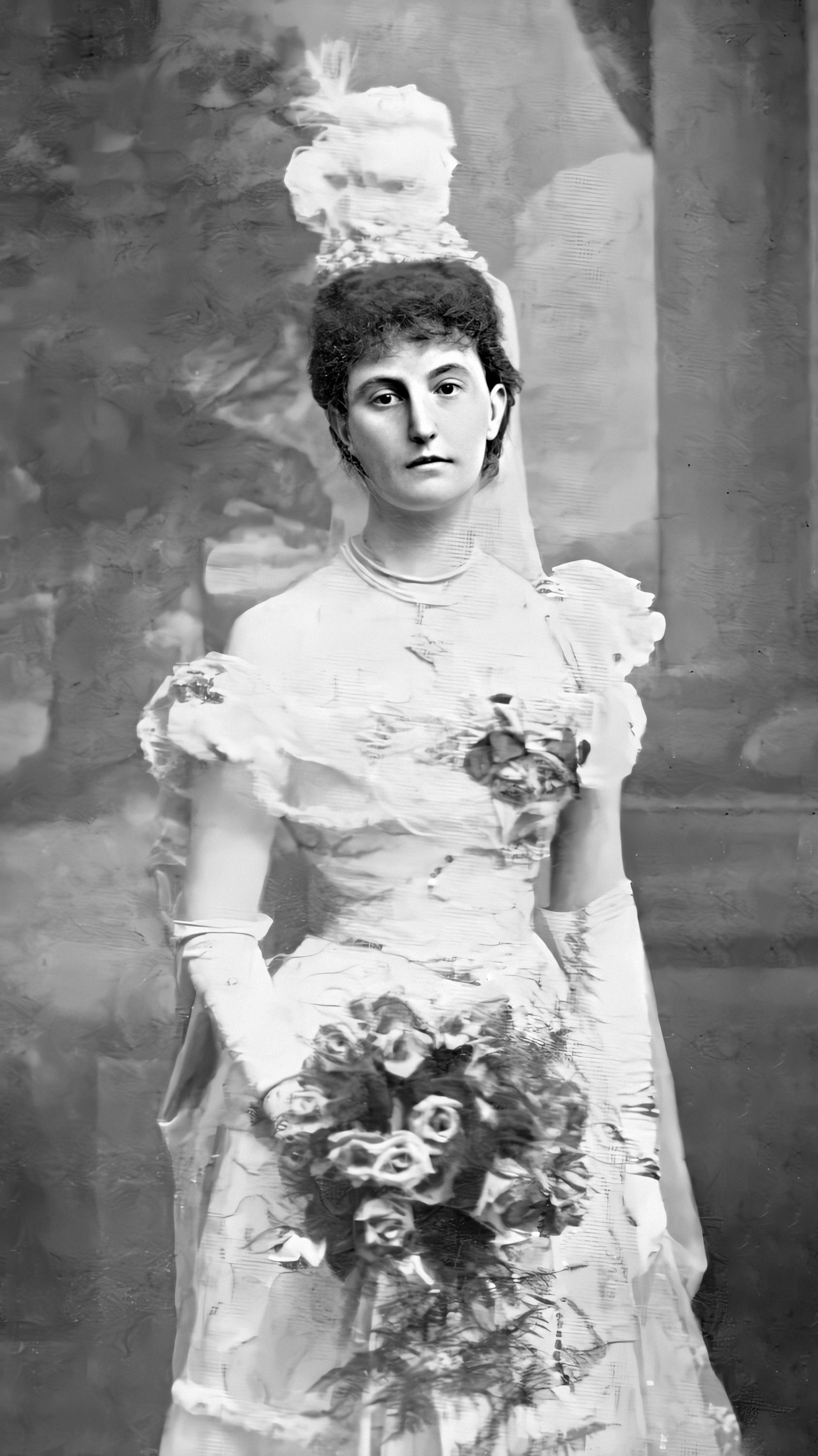
- Born: 16 April 1859; Gwrych Castle, Wales
- Died: 16 January 1924 (aged 64); London, England
- Burial place: St Cynbryd Churchyard, Llanddulas, Conwy, Wales
- Spouse: Douglas Cochrane, 12th Earl of Dundonald (m. 1878)
- Children: 5, including Lady Grizel Hamilton, Thomas Cochrane, 13th Earl of Dundonald, and Lady Jean Cochrane
- Parents: Robert Bamford Hesketh (father); Ellen Jones-Bateman (mother)

Signature
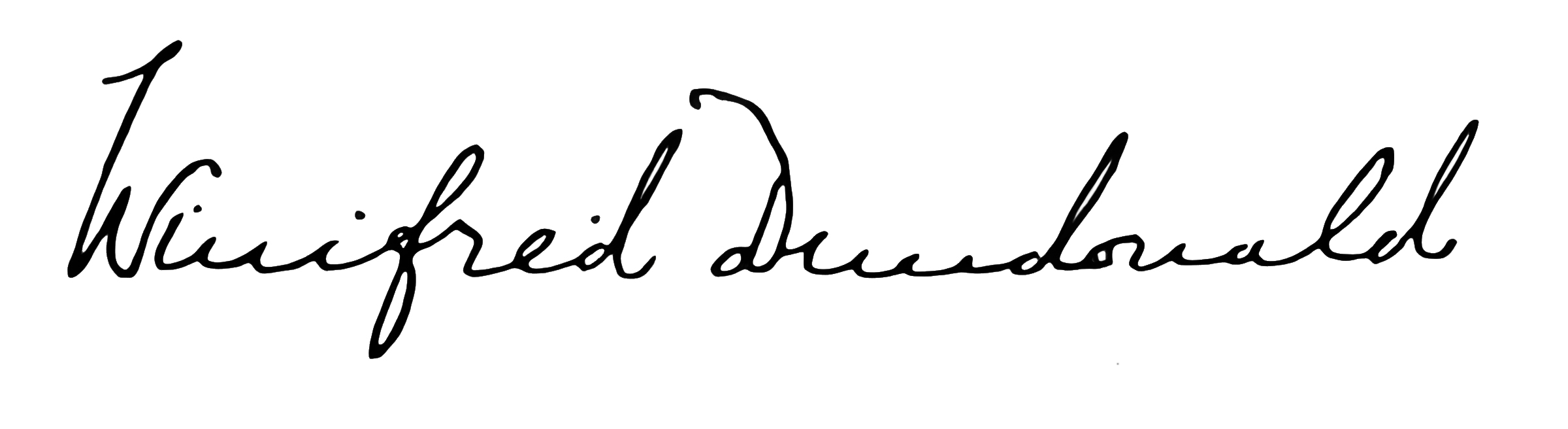

Winifred Cochrane, Countess of Dundonald (née Bamford-Hesketh; 16 April 1859 – 16 January 1924) was Welsh philanthropist, heiress, and noblewoman. She was the Welsh wife of Douglas Mackinnon Baillie Hamilton Cochrane (1852–1935). For her charity work, Lady Dundonald was appointed Lady of Grace of the Order of Saint John, and was known within Wales by her bardic name, Rhiannon.

== Ancestry ==
Winifred was the second daughter and sole heir of Robert Bamford Hesketh and Ellen Jones-Bateman.

== Personal life ==
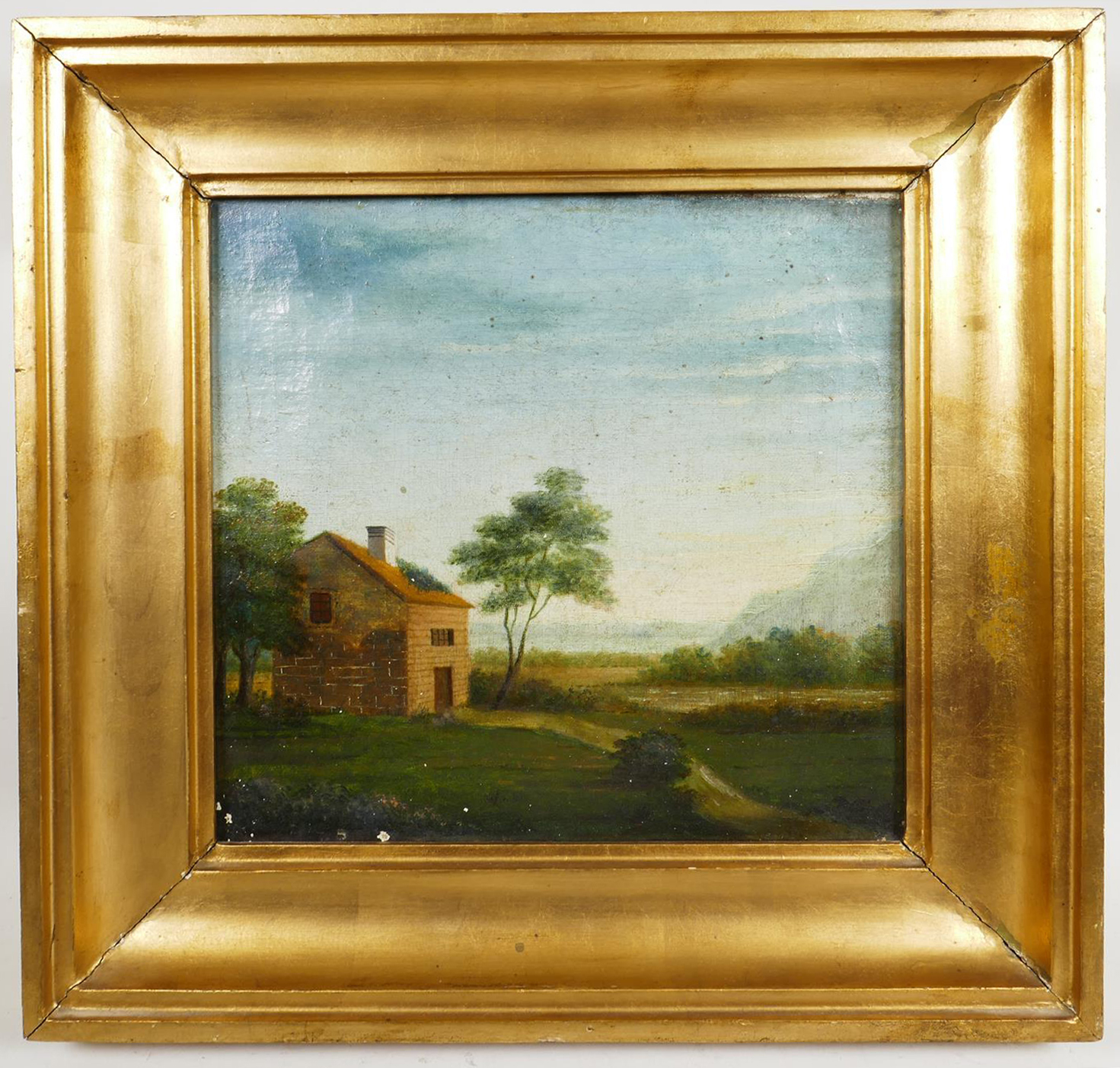
Pictured is Lady Dundonald's landscape oil painting

Growing up, Winifred Bamford Hesketh lived at her family's residences in London, Torquay and Gwrych Castle. Winifred was ~6 feet tall (182 cm).

In 1878, at the age of 19, she married Lieutenant General Douglas Mackinnon Baillie Hamilton Cochrane, 12th Earl of Dundonald.

The arranged marriage is thought to have been an unhappy one. The Earl spent most of his time in Scotland and fighting wars, while the Countess remained mostly in Wales.

With Douglas, she was the mother of five children; Lady Grizel Winifred Louisa Cochrane, Thomas Hesketh Douglas Blair Cochrane (heir), Douglas Robert Hesketh Roger Cochrane, Lady Jean Alice Elaine Cochrane and Lady Marjorie Gwendoline Elsie Cochrane.

When Winifred turned 21, the money in her trust fund became available and a house was purchased in London. She had five children between 1880 and 1893.

She had many friends within royal circles, who visited her at her Gwrych Castle estate. There is an account of Princess Marie Louise of Schleswig-Holstein staying at Gwrych in September 1901, accompanied by the Duke and Duchess of Argyll, where they then went on a day trip to Caernarfon.

After marrying Douglas, Winifred became enthralled by the life of Napoleon Bonaparte due to Thomas Cochrane, 10th Earl of Dundonald's involvement in the French Revolutionary and Napoleonic Wars. She did extensive research on Napoleon and she also had Napoleonic memorabilia at her home, one of which was a lock of Napoleon's own hair which Napoleon himself gave to Thomas in 1817 when he was kept at St. Helena, upon receiving the lock, Napoleon told him "This is all your country leaves me to give".

She was a deeply devout Christian, she volunteered a lot of her time to raise money for vulnerable people and during disasters as part of her work at the Church army, she was a public advocate explaining its work to the press.

It is believed that the Earl was landless and even through the marriage, the castle belonged solely to Winifred, according to the Omaha Sunday Bee; "In fact, until his marriage, the earl of Dundonald was a very poor man, glad to receive his salary as an officer in the British army."

Winifred died of heart failure on 16 January 1924, at her London residence. Her funeral was held at Llanddulas the following Saturday; it was documented as being a simple and modest service, attended by those closest to her. Her coffin was delivered by train from London to Llanddulas, where it was carried by a pony carriage. Feeling distraught, her daughter, Louisa Hamilton fainted on the platform at Chester Station whilst waiting for her connection to Abergele, on the way to the service at Llanddulas. Louisa's brother (most likely Thomas Cochrane) took her by taxi to her hotel, where she fainted again. Thomas then left Louisa in the care of the manageress so that he could attend the funeral; by the afternoon, Louisa was well enough to make her journey back to her home in London. Winifred's chief mourners were Robert Cochrane (her son) and her estranged husband, Douglas Cochrane.

In her will, she stipulated that; "Each of her sons should within one year of her death adopt the surname of Hesketh before, and in addition to, that of Cochrane, the benefits to them being conditional upon compliance therewith, and she further expressed the desire that each of her sons would in the naming of his own sons perpetuate the name of Lloyd." this was to reflect their Welsh lineage, however, this request never materialised.

=== Work and duties ===
"Lady Dundonald, says a society gossip is tall, slight and distinguished-looking. No one would give her credit for being the mother of five children, the oldest of whom is 19. She is an excellent hostess, but very quiet and unobtrusive. Her good works on her husband's property prove her a tactful Lady Bountiful. She has enthusiastically assisted her husband in his researches about the case of Admiral Cochrane, his ill-fated ancestor."

— The Falkirk Herald And Midland Counties Journal – 31 January 1900

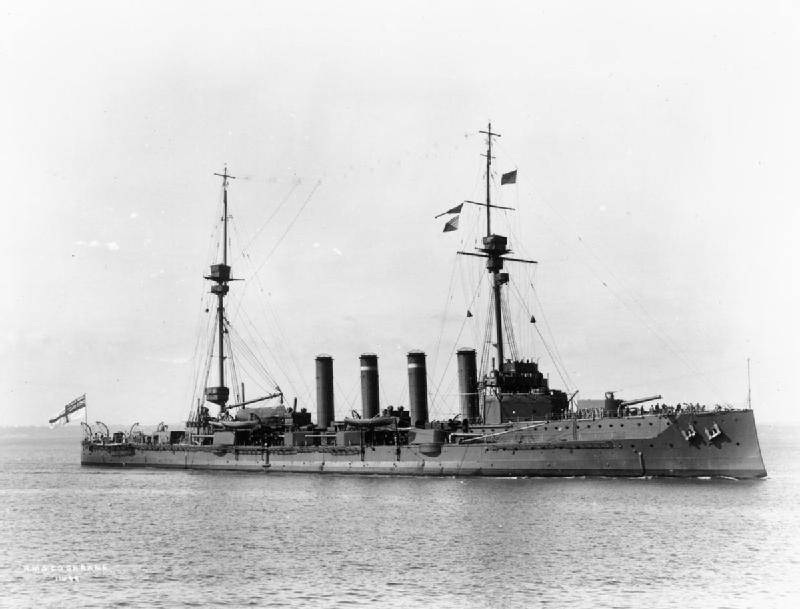
HMS Cochrane was named by Winifred, presumably to honour her husband, whose grandfather; Thomas Cochrane, 10th Earl of Dundonald was a British naval flag officer for the Royal Navy.

Apart from being a poet and writer in her spare time, she was a researcher and writer, she contributed literary works to Vogue which was owned at the time by Arthur Baldwin Turnure.

Most of Winifred's correspondences were managed by her agent, Mr. John Inglis who resided at Hên Wrych (Old Gwrych).

In the mid-1890s, she donated land to build Colwyn Bay Community Hospital which was completed in 1899, in December 1910, she returned to open a new operating theatre, soon after it was renamed to 'Colwyn Bay and West Denbighshire Hospital' which was the former name of Colwyn Bay Community Hospital.

In 1900, she opened the Royal Alexandra Hospital, Rhyl, a hospital which was built for 'sick and needy' children

The countess had a church hall built for the village of Llanddulas in 1909.

In 1914, Winifred supplied warm clothing to the Royal Welsh Fusiliers and Denbighshire Hussars, following an appeal, in November of the same year, she presented a large ambulance (presumably a Ford Model T) fully equipped and accompanied by a driver to the Red Cross Society (seventh division), she also donated a great deal of anaesthetics to several hospitals, she stressed that there was urgent need for chloroform at the base hospitals.

The Countess opened a hospital in 1914 at 87 Eaton Square, Belgravia, London, to treat the wounded of the Great War, the 'Countess of Dundonald Hospital', she paid for its upkeep; such as gas and electricity. She personally managed it and she called the 'war hospital' (refraining from mentioning her own name). It closed at the end of the war in 1918.

She was a patron of 'The united Gentlewomen's Handicrafts society'

Along with Prince Louis of Battenberg, she was made an associate of the 'Royal Colonial Institute' in London, England, which is now known as the Royal Commonwealth Society.

=== Political views ===
Winifred was Abergele's ruling councillor. She became an officer for Abergele's Primrose League in 1904, a division that was established at the town in 1886, the organisation followed Conservative principles. By 1913, she was no longer a member.

== Gwrych Castle ==
The countess inherited Gwrych Castle, the seat of the Bamford-Hesketh family, on the death of her father in 1894. In 1899 & 1900 she was involved in a bitter dispute with the District Council over road improvements, and as a consequence she felled an avenue of trees much loved by the inhabitants of Abergele.

In 1919, she sold some of the old buildings on the estate, along with the Llanddulas limestone quarry and some mines.

In her will, she bequeathed Gwrych to Prince George, later King George V, who was unable to accept the gift and sold the castle. It was later re-purchased by her husband, the Earl of Dundonald, for £70,000 (calculated at £4,288,000 in 2019 after inflation), although he nor his family would live there.

== Participation in Welsh Culture, Heritage and National Affairs ==
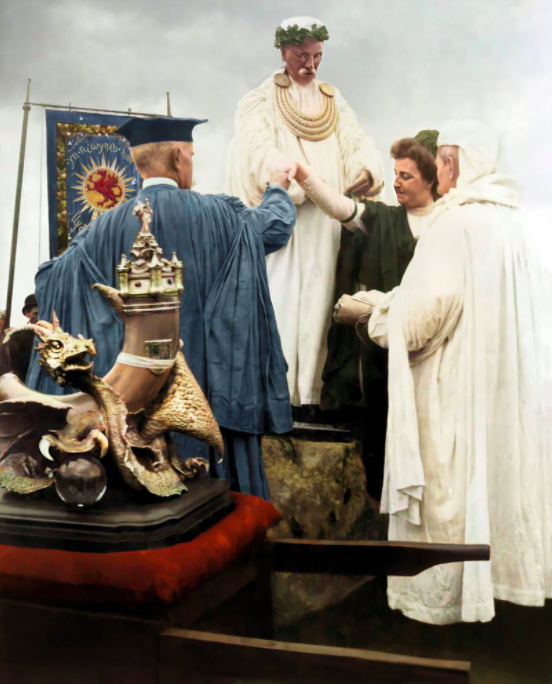
Winifred, Countess of Dundonald (under her bardic name 'Rhianon') being awarded an ovate by the archdruid at the 1910 National Eisteddfod, Colwyn Bay, North Wales.

Winifred became a patron of the Gwynedd Ladies' Art Society. This was started by Miss Clearance Whaite, and presided over by Lady Augusta Mostyn in 1894. The society was absorbed into what would be called Mostyn gallery.

She was a stout supporter of Welsh industries, she was president of the Denbighshire division of the Welsh Industrial Association. In 1900, the association held an exhibition at 83 Eaton Square, (which was Winifred's address in London) at which; Princess of Wales visited. In the same year, Winifred opened an exhibition at the Anglesey branch of the Welsh industries, which was held at Menai Bridge.

The countess was a Welsh-speaker and a patron of Welsh art, music and literature.

In the early 1900s she founded a North Wales Harp competition. She was heavily involved within the Eisteddfod, especially within the arts and crafts section where she was given the task of opening the art exhibition in 1910. She was initiated as an ovate at the Colwyn Bay National Eisteddfod in 1910. She supported the organisation financially and attended it every year.

Winifred was interested in archaeology, and was involved with the Abergele Historical and Cambrian Societies, most noticeably the Cambrian Archaeological Association where she was a member. She allowed excavations on ancient monuments she owned and financed the publication of their findings.

It is not known for how long she held the position, however in an article from 1914, she is mentioned as being the president of 'Vale of Clwyd Toys', a company which was founded by a Mary Heaton in 1909. Mary's ambition was to employ and train Welsh villagers and disabled soldiers to build Welsh furniture and toys during the winter months. One of the most popular toys they produced was miniature models of the Gorsedd within the National Eisteddfod of Wales.

== Charitable works ==
Knowing how vulnerable local poor people were during the winter months, like her father before her, Winifred would often donate firewood from the fell at her properties to keep them warm.

On her death Winifred bequeathed £5000 and a piece of land for building almshouses in Groes Lwyd, Abergele. She also bequeathed the whole Gwyrch estate to the Welsh Church.

=== Advocacy of children's rights ===
Winifred was a member of the NSPCC, which often held parties at the Queen's Hall to raise money for preventing cruelty to children.

She was also one of the leading members of the 'children's happy evenings association', an organisation which raised money to fund the purchase of sports equipment. Queen Mary was its patron.

She was one of the patrons for the 'Bat and ball club', an establishment which raised money to buy sports equipments for poor children.

=== Advocacy of women's rights ===
On Friday, 27 February 1914, Winifred, through the Conservative and Unionist Women's Franchise Association, a women's suffrage organisation, chaired a meeting at Bechstein Hall.

She contributed to the 'WI'. When the Women's Institutes came to Britain for the first time, the first organisation was held at Anglesey, where she was one of the first members.

=== Advocacy of the elderly ===
Winifred ensured that the elderly were catered for at any given chance. When she started to sell her properties, she made sure that elderly tenants were excluded from eviction, thus; selling only when they had passed, she also hosted an event for the elderly every year at a Church house in Llanddulas to celebrate the new year where she'd pay for the tea, food and entertainments. On her death in 1924, a large sum of money was set aside to found the Winifred Bamford Hesketh Almshouses. The charity is based in Groes Llwyd, Abergele and owns ten purpose-built, one bedroom bungalows for elderly residents. There is also an eleventh bungalow, with two bedrooms and a garage, especially for the resident Warden.

=== Advocacy of animal rights ===
As well as being a humanitarian, Winifred also fought for the rights of animals. She was a patron of the society for the abolition of vivisection, whose goal was the "total suppression of vivisection, or putting animals to death by torture"
