= Douglas Cochrane, 12th Earl of Dundonald =

British Army officer and politician (1852–1935)

Lieutenant-General The Right Honourable The Earl of Dundonald KCB KCVO
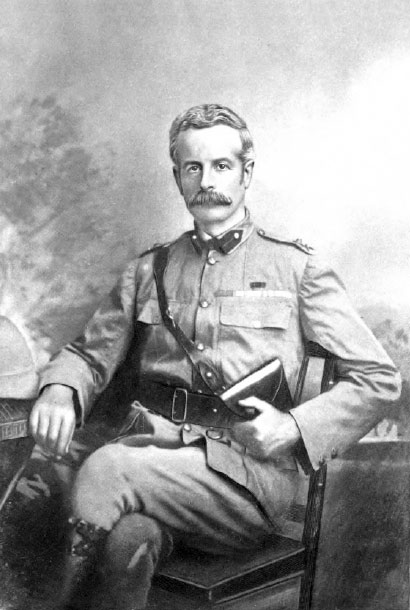
- Lord Dundonald in 1904
- Born: 29 October 1852; Banff, Scotland
- Died: 12 April 1935 (aged 82); Wimbledon, England
- Education: Eton College
- Spouse: Winifred Bamford-Hesketh (m. 1878; died 1924)
- Children: 5, including Thomas
- Relatives: Thomas Cochrane, 11th Earl of Dundonald (father); Louisa Harriet Mackinnon (mother); Thomas Cochrane, 1st Baron Cochrane of Cults (brother)
- Military career
- Allegiance: United Kingdom
- Branch: British Army
- Rank: Lieutenant-General
- Commands: General Officer Commanding the Militia of Canada; 2nd Regiment of Life Guards
- Conflicts: Mahdist War; Second Boer War; First World War
- Awards: Mentioned in Despatches (7)

Signature
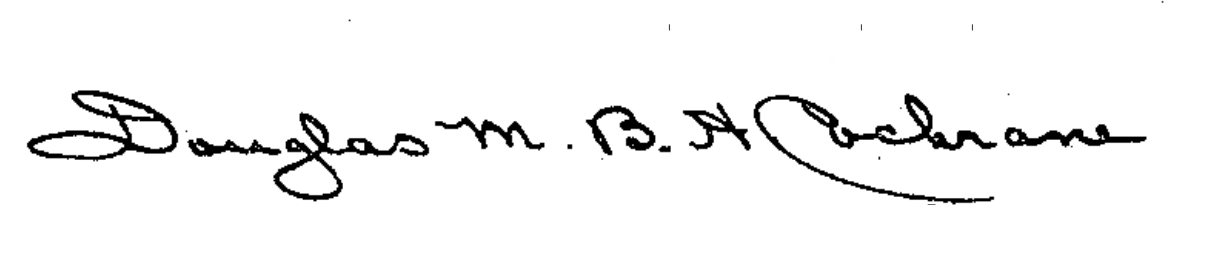

Lieutenant-General Douglas Mackinnon Baillie Hamilton Cochrane, 12th Earl of Dundonald, KCB, KCVO (29 October 1852 – 12 April 1935), styled Lord Cochrane between 1860 and 1885, was a British Army officer and politician.

== Early life ==
Cochrane was the second but eldest surviving son of Thomas Cochrane, 11th Earl of Dundonald, by Louisa Harriet Mackinnon, daughter of William Alexander Mackinnon. Thomas Cochrane, 1st Baron Cochrane of Cults, was his younger brother. He was educated at Eton College.

== Military career ==
Lord Dundonald, Speaking at the annual gathering of the Scottish Clans Association in London, said that while commanding the forces in Canada he had succeeded in changing the uniforms of several regiments, and dressing them in the Highland garb. Lord Dundonald is Closely associated with the Clan Mackinnon, his mother being a native of that clan.

— Inverness Courier - Friday 30 November 1906

Cochrane was commissioned into the Life Guards in July 1870, and was promoted to lieutenant the following year and captain in 1878. In 1884, he went to the Soudan in command of a detachment of the Camel Corps in the expedition for the relief of Khartoum, for his distinguished services in this campaign, he was mentioned in dispatched and received the medal with two clasps and the Khedive's bronze star with the brevet of lieutenant-colonel. He then served in the Nile Expedition, the Desert March and the Relief of Khartoum in 1885. In 1889 he reached the rank of full colonel in the army. In 1895, he was appointed commanding officer of the 2nd Life Guards.

He served in the Second Boer War and in November 1899 he volunteered to be the Commander of the Mounted Brigade, part of the South Natal Field Force, whilst there on the 22nd of the same month, Sir Redvers Buller gave him command over the mounted troops (which mainly consisted of colonial irregulars). For these services, he was mentioned six times in dispatches, received the medal with six clasps and was promoted to the rank of major-general for distinguished service to the field. He took part in the Relief of Ladysmith in February 1900, although his South African troops, unimpressed by his leadership, referred to him as "Dundoodle".

In April 1902, it was announced that Lord Dundonald would be appointed General Officer Commanding the Militia of Canada, the senior military officer in Canada. He left Liverpool on 15 July, and arrived in Quebec and Ottawa later the same month to take up his position. He and his family stayed at Crichton Lodge in Rockcliffe, Ottawa, Ian McAllister of Morton College, Oxford was appointed as his private secretary whilst in charge. During his time at Canada, he authored a scheme for the reorganisation of the Canadian militia on entirely new lines, which was adopted, he also wrote a drill and training book, directed towards Cavalry and infantry, additionally, he revamped the cadet corps structure and established several other associations aimed at enhancing the militia. He was also able to change the dress codes of many Scottish regiments to align more with their culture. He served in Canada for two years until he was dismissed by the dominion cabinet due to his outburst at a dinner in Montreal, described as "utterances at a banquet" in newspaper articles and officially termed "Indiscretion and insubordination" by the cabinet. In defence of his critics, Dundonald asserted that communication between him and the minister of the militia had been corrupted which left Canada defenceless.

Lord Dundonald asserts that the militia has been grossly interfered with by party politicians, He alleges that important parts of his reports for 1902 and 1903 were wrongfully suppressed by the minister of militia, contrary to his wishes. Sir Frederick Borden is charged by Lord Dundonald with falsehood in the house of commons. He declares the militia has been greatly neglected and lacks all that is necessary to make it efficient. The Great northwest, the officer points out, is left defenceless, without even a gun. As regards preparation for war and readiness to resist aggression. The people of Canada, Lord Dundonald says, are living in a fool's paradise. Had he made only an official protest, he adds, it would have been pigeonholed, as many others had been.

— The Boston Record - 20 June 1904

In 1904, two military issued books; 'Infantry Training Canada 1904' & 'cavalry training 1904' were written by Douglas and published by the London War office.

In 1910, Douglas, after being appointed colonel of the 2nd Life Guards in April 1907, was appointed the first 'gold stick in waiting' for King George V, and on arrival of Theodore Roosevelt, he was the king's 'aide de camp'.

He later served in the First World War as chairman of the Admiralty Committee on Smoke Screens in 1915.

He relinquished his appointment as colonel of the 2nd Life Guards in March 1919.

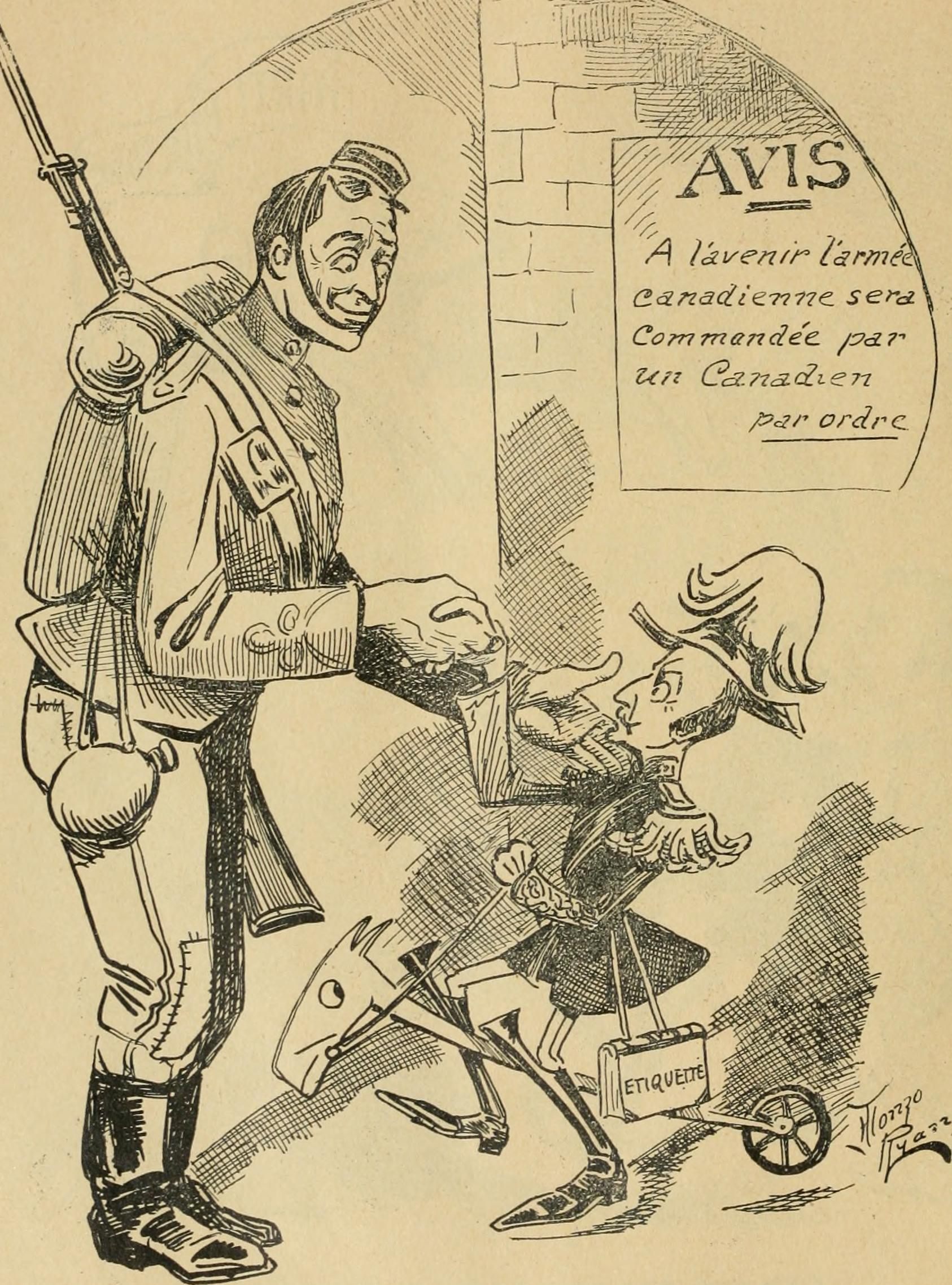
A caricature of Douglas in Canada mocking his stature in a childlike manner (1904)

In 1921, he became a 'special ambassador' to the Peruvian Centenary.

=== Inventions ===
A list of his inventions that were patented;

- 'Pocket-stove', (Patented 25 August 1896)

- 'Carriage and Traction Arrangement for a Machine or Quick Firing Gun', (Patented 18 August 1896)

- 'An Improvement in Nosebags for Horses', (Patented 7 September 1896)

- 'Improvements in Horse Traction Arrangements for Vehicles', (Patented 1 May 1897)

- 'Improvements in Ambulances and other Vehicles, especially adapted for Camel Traction', (patented 3 September 1897)

- 'Ammunition holder for machine guns', (Patented 19 July, I898)

- 'Bicycle saddle'; A Yielding Seat applicable in lieu of Saddle, (Patented 6 September, I898)

- 'Apparatus for Mechanical Patrontilførlsen by Guardian'; cartridge supply, (Patented 2 February 1899)

- 'Improvements in the Coupling and Traction of Bicycles', (Patented 18 February 1899)

- 'Tea or Coffee pot'; which was later manufactured as a teapot by the Wedgwood company, and marketed as the "SYP" (Simple Yet Perfect). Later, in 1911 a licence to manufacture 'S.Y.P. teapots and coffee pots' was applied for with James Dixon & Sons. (Patented 16 July 1901)

== Personal life ==
When Lord Dundonald is not busy with war he is practising scientific stock raising and agriculture on his Welsh estate, Gwrych Castle.

— Munsey's Magazine: Vol 32 Iss 1 - October 1904

In 1878, the British government paid a grant to Douglas of the sum of £5000 (equivalent to ~£530,238.00 in June 2026) as backpay for this grandfather's services in the Napoleonic wars; "in respect of the distinguished services of his grandfather, the late Lord dundonald."

Lord Dundonald married Winifred Bamford-Hesketh, daughter of Robert Bamford-Hesketh, in 1878. For many years, the family lived at Gwrych Castle in North Wales, the seat of the Bamford-Hesketh family. The Countess of Dundonald did not accompany her husband to Canada. They had two sons and three daughters:

- Lady Grizel Winifred Louisa Cochrane (1880–1976), who married Lt.-Col. Hon. Ralph Gerard Alexander Hamilton, Master of Belhaven (1883–1918), only son of Alexander Hamilton, 10th Lord Belhaven and Stenton, in 1904. He was killed during the Battle of Amiens.
- Thomas Hesketh Douglas Blair Cochrane, 13th Earl of Dundonald (1886–1958), a Capt. of the Scots Guards who served as a Representative Peer for Scotland from 1941 to 1955.
- Lady Jean Alice Elaine Cochrane (1887–1955), who married Herbert Hervey, 5th Marquess of Bristol in 1914. They divorced in 1933 and she married Capt. Sir Peter Drummond MacDonald, a son of Ronald MacDonald, in December 1933.
- Lady Marjorie Gwendoline Elsie Cochrane (b. 1889), who married Owsley Vincent Fydell Rowley, eldest son of George Fydell Rowley in 1917. They divorced in 1932.
- Hon. Douglas Robert Hesketh Roger Cochrane (1893–1942), who married Enid Marion Davis, a daughter of Miles Leonard Davies, in 1918.

Douglas owned several treasures from the Napoleonic wars, heirlooms from his grandfather, Thomas Cochrane, the 10th Earl, one of these items was a lock of Napoleon's hair.

He owned live stock, it is not known where they were located, but an article from 1900 mentions that he owned pigs.

His wife died in January 1924. Lord Dundonald died at his home in Wimbledon in April 1935, aged 82, and was succeeded in the earldom by his eldest son, Thomas.

In 1926, he published an autobiographical book of his military career titled called 'My Army Life'.

He is buried in Achnaba Churchyard, Ardchattan near Benderloch, Lorne, Argyll and Bute. As his eldest son died unmarried and without issue, he was succeeded by his nephew, Ian Douglas Leonard Cochrane as the 14th Earl of Dundonald.

It was noted after his death that he enjoyed smoking his pipe and that he would cut up cigars in half to 'plug' into them to smoke, he said that it was a 'good way of making them last longer'.

=== Honours and legacy ===
Lord Dundonald was appointed a Commander of the Royal Victorian Order (CVO) in December 1901, and in June 1907 knighted as a Knight Commander (KCVO) of the order.

Dundonald Park, in Centretown, Ottawa, is named after him.

== See also ==
- Earl of Dundonald
- Clan Cochrane

== Sources ==
- Farrar-Hockley, General Sir Anthony (1975). Goughie. London: Granada. ISBN -0246640596.

Military offices
Preceded by Sir Richard O'Grady Haly	General Officer Commanding the Militia of Canada; 1902–1904	Succeeded by Sir Percy Lake (as Chief of the General Staff (Canada))
Preceded by The Lord Grenfell	Colonel of the 2nd Regiment of Life Guards; 1907–1919	Succeeded by Sir Cecil Bingham
Peerage of Scotland
Preceded by Thomas Barnes Cochrane	Earl of Dundonald; 1885–1935	Succeeded by Thomas Hesketh Douglas Blair Cochrane
