= Priestfield House =

Coordinates: 56.2700°N 3.0651°W

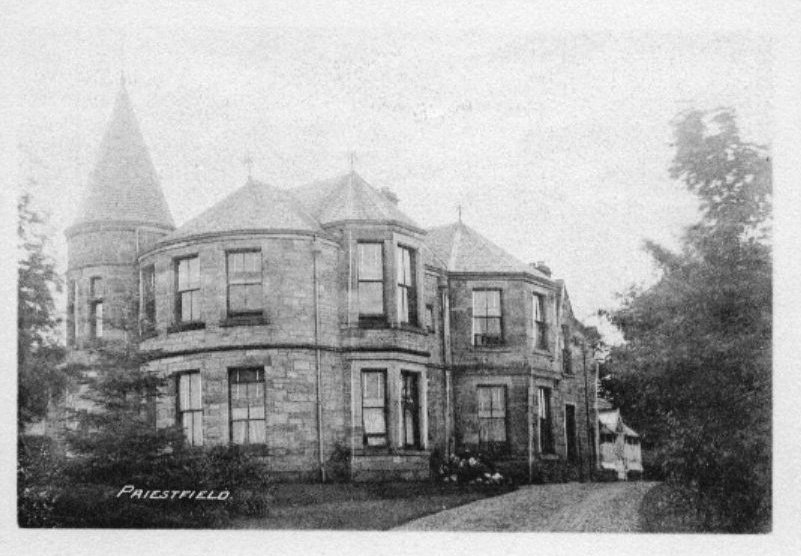
Priestfield House

Priestfield House was a Victorian Country House near Cults, Fife, Scotland.

== History ==
The estate, originally an outlying property of Crawford Priory, was purchased from the Earl of Glasgow by a wealthy merchant, James Martin Esq. in 1889. In 1892, he aggrandized the existing house by the addition of a substantial East Wing, comprising a first floor Billiards Room, a conical tower and a large Dining Room. In addition to this, the existing Service Wing was expanded to accommodate a larger domestic staff. The architect for the work was James Ross Gillespie of Gillespie & Scott of Queen Street, St Andrews. The same architect was responsible for the construction of the extensive Priestfield Maltings nearby.

The House was demolished in c.1968, owing partially to the decay of the East Wing. The Wash House, a fragment of the original service wing, survives.

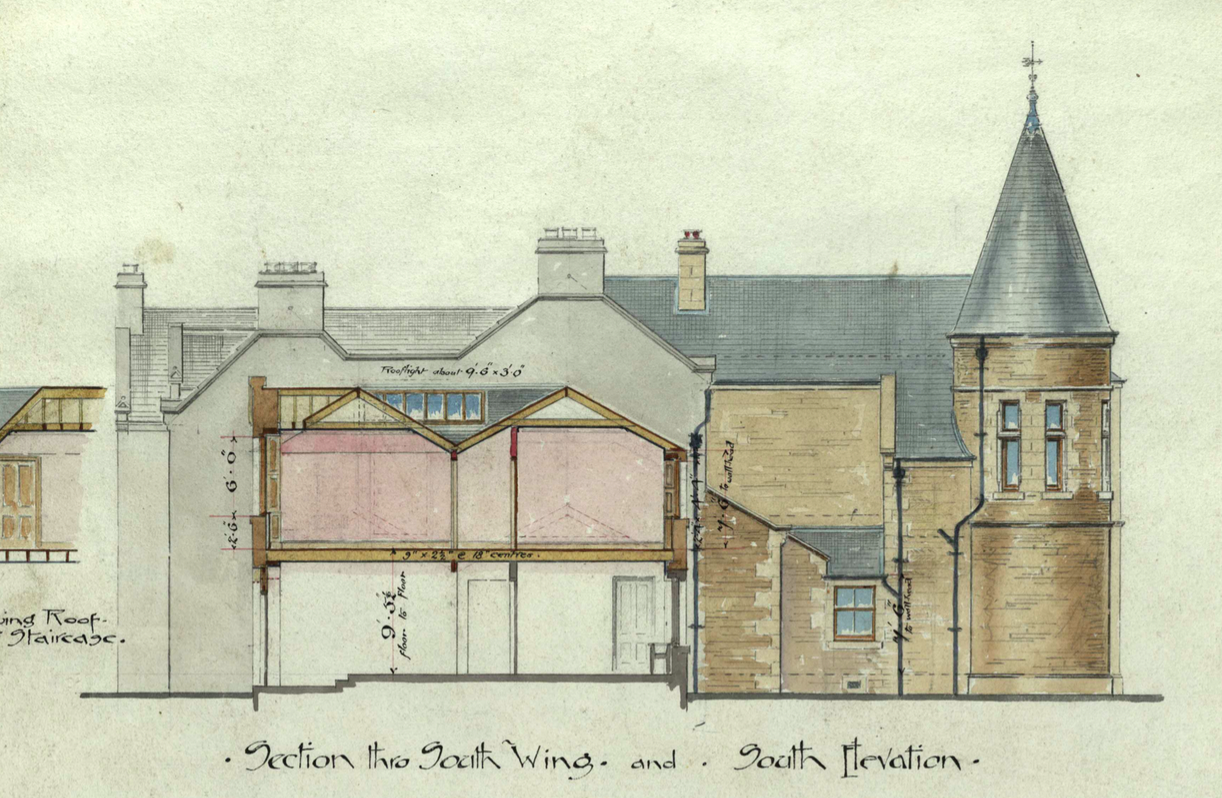
South Elevation of the enlarged Priestfield House

== Family ==
James Martin (1841–1898), a merchant, bought the Priestfield Estate, initially comprising the farms of Priestfield, Pitlessie Mill and Brotus, as well as the superiority of the village of Pitlessie. Martin was an agriculturalist and industrialist, with extensive interests in malting, and the mining and burning of lime. At his death, his Cults lime works were said to be the largest of their kind in Scotland. He died childless, and the estate passed to his niece, Mary Martin Smith Martin (1875–1909). The House was subsequently inherited by her brother, James Martin Smith JP, Laird of Priestfield (1876–1933), who assumed the additional surname of Martin. He married Marion Martin Smith (née Ainslie), of the families of Ainslie of Dolphinton and Hunter of Polmood.
