= Thomas Cochran =

Thomas Cochran may refer to:

- Thomas Cochran (Nova Scotia politician) (1733–1801), merchant and politician in Nova Scotia
- Thomas Cochran (judge) (1777–1804), third Chief Justice of Prince Edward Island and judge in Upper Canada
- Thomas Cochran (banker) (1871–1936), vice-president, Astor Trust Company, 1906–1914; president, Liberty National Bank of New York, 1914–1916
- Thomas Cunningham Cochran (1877–1957), U.S. Representative from Pennsylvania, 1927–1935
- Thomas C. Cochran (historian) (1902–1999), U.S. historian of business

Tom Cochran may refer to:

- Tom Cochran (American football) (1924–2010), NFL football player for Washington Redskins
- Tom Cochran (politician) (born 1953), former member of Michigan House of Representatives
- Tom Cochran (technologist) (born 1977), Obama administration technology official

== See also ==
- Thomas Cochrane (disambiguation)
