= Pitlessie =

Coordinates: 56°16′31.08″N 3°4′37.17″W

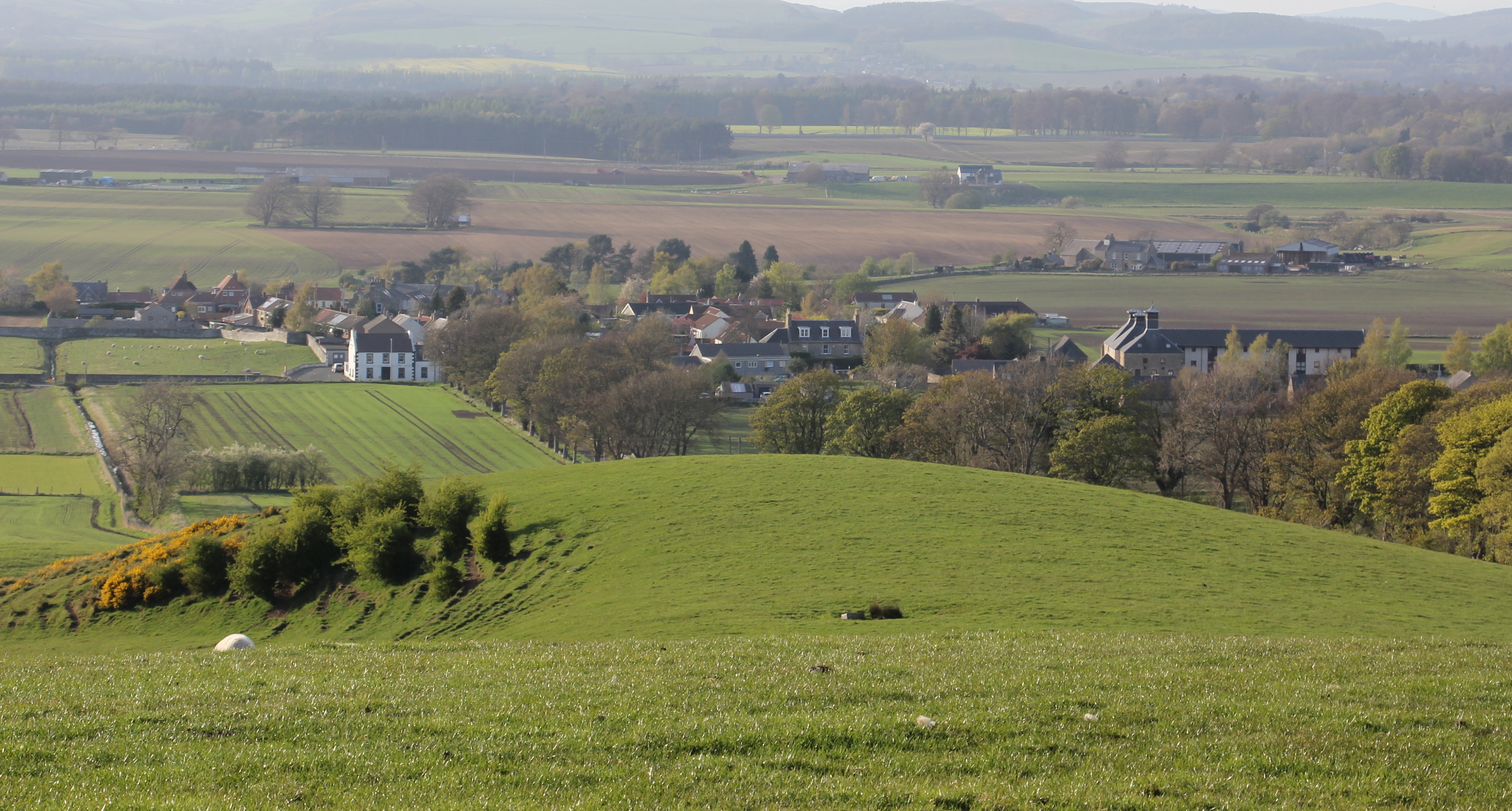
- Pitlessie, seen from Cults Hill

- Location within Fife
- Population: 325 (2010 estimate)
- OS grid reference: NO33400972
  - Edinburgh: 23 mi (37 km)
- Civil parish: Cults, Fife
- Council area: Fife
- Lieutenancy area: Fife
- Country: Scotland
- Sovereign state: United Kingdom
- Post town: CUPAR
- Postcode district: KY15
- Police: Scotland
- Fire: Scottish
- Ambulance: Scottish
- UK Parliament: North East Fife
- Scottish Parliament: North East Fife

Pitlessie is a small village in Cults, Fife, Scotland. It is roughly 4 1/2 miles (7 km) southwest of the nearest large town, Cupar, and 23 miles (37 kilometres) north of Edinburgh. It had an estimated population of 325 in 2010.

Situated in the heart of the Howe of Fife, the village was mainly concerned with the linen industry and agriculture - the primary employers in many villages in the area along the River Eden. Pitlessie's roots can be traced back at least as far as the 13th century, with it being created twice a free burgh of barony. Other industries such as mining and malting also employed many in the village, though these, along with the post office and village shop, have since ceased.

Now, based along the A914, the village primarily serves commuters employed in the surrounding towns and cities, with a village inn the sole notable amenity of Pitlessie, attracting tourists and locals alike.

== History ==
There are references to Pitlessie dating back to the 13th century, though the clarity of these are poor until the land comes into the ownership of Ramornie of that ilk, proprietors of Pitlessie and surrounding lands until 1439 when it was sold by Alexander Ramornie to John, 1st Lord Lindsay. The legacy of the Ramornie estate is still present and can be found to the west of the village, in the form of Ramornie Mains and Ramornie Mill.

On 2 January 1541, Pitlessie was created a free burgh of barony in favour of John, 4th Lord Lindsay by James V. The land was then passed down through his descendants until it was later sold to Crawford of Montquhanie. On 17 September 1681, Pitlessie was once again erected as the free burgh of barony of Forret in favour of Sir David Balfour of Forret by Charles II.

In 1736, George Heggie was given sasine to Pitlessie. His influences on the village include the nearby Heggie's Muir Wood, which is likely to have taken his family name, and a now category B listed Georgian manor at the entrance of the village built by Heggie in 1737, known as Pitlessie House.

From its beginnings, the linen industry of the River Eden, along with the surrounding arable farmland, served as primary employers for the village's small populous. Additionally, limestone quarries on Cults hill, and sandstone quarries closer to the Eden proved successful and provided additional employment for others.

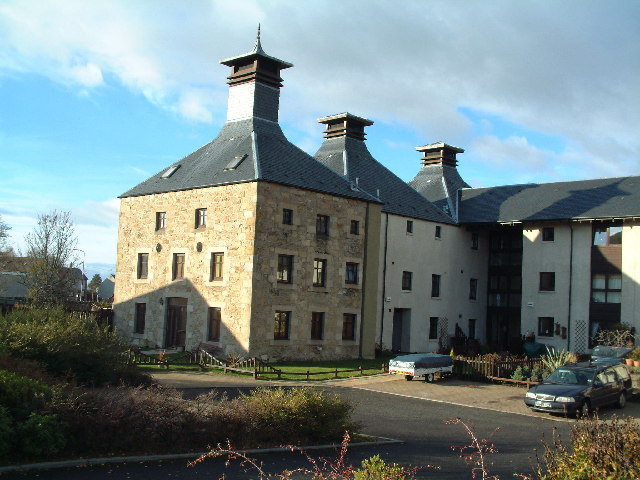
The former Priestfield Maltings, now converted into housing

Further population growth occurred in 1890 with the arrival of the new Priestfield Maltings. Founded by James Martin of Priestfield, the maltings were acquired by the Bonthrone family in 1937 who operated similar facilities in Newton of Falkland, Ladybank, Stratheden, and Auchtermuchty. It once produced over 2,000 tonnes of malt and employed 14 men. Production remained in action until 1968 when the owners at that time, Scottish Malt Distillers, changed strategies. The category B listed building was converted into housing in 1996. There were previously much smaller maltings behind Pitlessie House, operated at an unknown time.

=== Toponymy ===
Pitlessie is thought to mean either 'place of the farm,' 'pett of the burn,' or 'place of the green pett' - with the former being the most likely. The aforementioned burn would point to the Pitlessie Burn, which runs through the village into the River Eden. The latter name would suggest that there was good grazing land in the area.

== Governance ==
Pitlessie is in the North East Fife UK Parliament and North East Fife Scottish Parliament constituencies, as well as the Cupar ward of Fife Council. Local issues in the village and wider parish are managed by the Cults Community Council, which meets on the first Monday of every second month in the Wilkie Memorial Hall.

== Culture ==
The Pitlessie Flower Show is a yearly event which takes place in the late summer. Originally an evening show ran by the Highland Games Committee, the show hosts many competitions for locals and those from afar of all ages, and is funded through the support of those in the local community.

== Landmarks ==
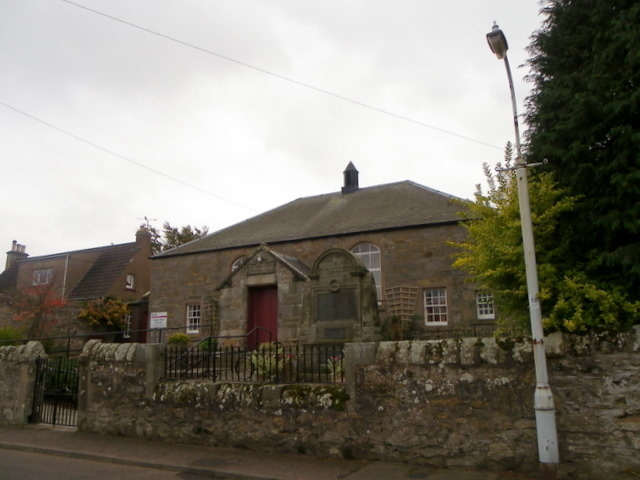
Wilkie Memorial Hall

The Sir David Wilkie Memorial Hall was constructed in 1897 in the style of a Georgian Chapel. Outside it is a war memorial to the men in the parish who were killed in the world wars. The Pitlessie Public Park was opened in 1900, on land gifted to the Parish Council by the Laird of Priestfield.

== Education ==
Pitlessie Primary School, founded in 1860, serves Pitlessie, the parish of Cults and a portion of the Howe of Fife. The school, along with Craigrothie Primary, is led by Tamsin Frost and is attended by a single class of under 20 pupils. Secondary school aged pupils attend the nearby Bell Baxter High School in Cupar.

== Notable residents ==
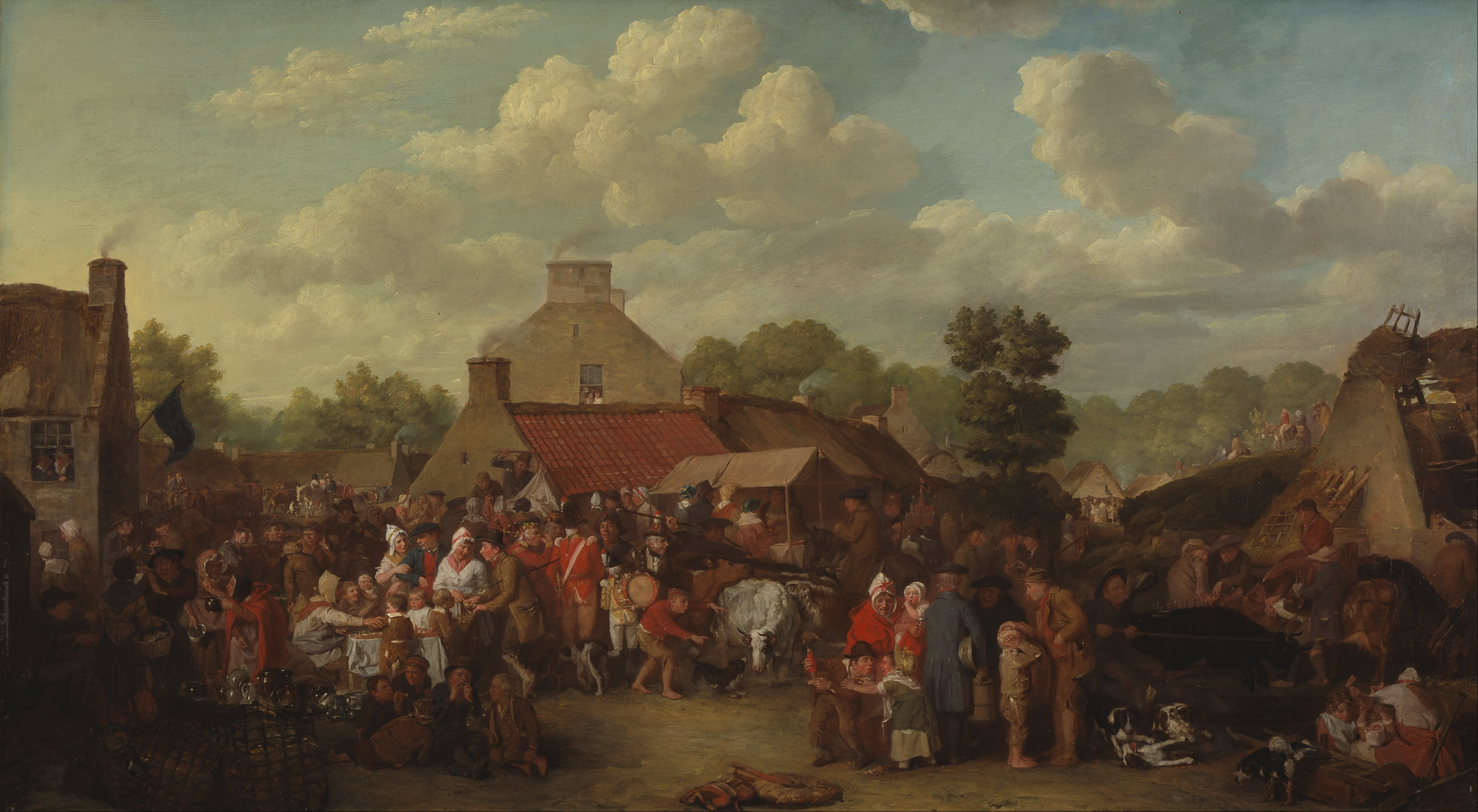
Pitlessie Fair (1804) by Sir David Wilkie

The village was the birthplace of artist Sir David Wilkie who also attended school in the village, son to the parish minister. After returning from the Trustees' Academy in 1804, in one of his earliest works, he depicted the scenes of Pitlessie Fair which included many of his family members and neighbours. A large reproduction of this painting now hangs above the stage in the Sir David Wilkie Memorial Hall, which was built in his memory.
