= List of listed buildings in Cults, Fife =

This is a list of listed buildings in the parish of Cults in Fife, Scotland.

== List ==
Name	Location	Date listed	Grid ref. (Note: Sometimes known as OSGB36, the grid reference (where provided) is based on the British national grid reference system used by the Ordnance Survey. • "Guide to National Grid". Ordnance Survey. • "Get-a-map". Ordnance Survey.)	Geo-coordinates	Notes	LB number (Note: Historic Environment Scotland assign a unique alphanumeric identifier to each designated site in Scotland, for listed buildings this always begins with "LB", for example "LB12345".)	Image
Crawford Priory Former Stable Block				56°17′29″N 3°03′11″W	Category B	2569	Upload another image
Crawford Priory The Lodge (Formerly North Lodge), Gatepiers, And Gateway To North				56°17′39″N 3°02′58″W	Category C(S)	2570	Upload Photo
Cults Church, Cemetery Walls Gatepiers And Sessionhouse				56°16′37″N 3°03′24″W	Category B	2577	Upload another image
Pitlessie Village Priestfield Maltings				56°16′29″N 3°04′20″W	Category B	2601	Upload another image
Pitlessie Village Pitlessie House And Offices (Former Maltings)				56°16′28″N 3°04′27″W	Category B	2600	Upload Photo
Cults Manse Dovecot				56°16′36″N 3°03′23″W	Category B	2575	Upload Photo
Crawford Priory Dovecot				56°17′25″N 3°03′21″W	Category B	2568	Upload Photo
Crawford Priory Walton Hill Mausloeum, Enclosing Wall And Gatepiers				56°16′51″N 3°02′28″W	Category B	2572	Upload another image
Cults Farmhouse And Gatepiers				56°16′18″N 3°02′53″W	Category C(S)	2578	Upload Photo
Springfield Village Church, Churchyard Walls And Gatepiers				56°17′40″N 3°03′55″W	Category C(S)	2603	Upload another image
Pitlessie Village Pitlessie Arms				56°16′26″N 3°04′28″W	Category C(S)	137	Upload another image See more images
Pitlessie Village Ramornie Road-Bridge Over River Eden				56°16′30″N 3°05′05″W	Category C(S)	2602	Upload Photo
Pitlessie Village Dundas Cottage				56°16′29″N 3°04′35″W	Category C(S)	2599	Upload Photo
Crawford Priory Sundial				56°17′15″N 3°03′05″W	Category B	2571	Upload another image
Crawford Priory West Gate Gatepiers At Bramble Cottage				56°16′52″N 3°03′46″W	Category C(S)	2573	Upload Photo
Crawford Priory West Gate Gatepiers At West Lodge				56°16′51″N 3°03′51″W	Category C(S)	2574	Upload Photo
Lower Bunzeon Farmhouse				56°16′15″N 3°03′23″W	Category B	2579	Upload Photo
Crawford Priory				56°17′22″N 3°03′20″W	Category B	2567	Upload another image
Cults Manse Walled Garden And Outbuildings				56°16′36″N 3°03′24″W	Category C(S)	2576	Upload Photo

== Key ==
The scheme for classifying buildings in Scotland is:

- Category A: "buildings of national or international importance, either architectural or historic; or fine, little-altered examples of some particular period, style or building type."
- Category B: "buildings of regional or more than local importance; or major examples of some particular period, style or building type, which may have been altered."
- Category C: "buildings of local importance; lesser examples of any period, style, or building type, as originally constructed or moderately altered; and simple traditional buildings which group well with other listed buildings."

In March 2016 there were 47,288 listed buildings in Scotland. Of these, 8% were Category A, and 50% were Category B, with the remaining 42% being Category C.

== See also ==
- List of listed buildings in Fife
