= Pitlessie Fair =

Painting by David Wilkie

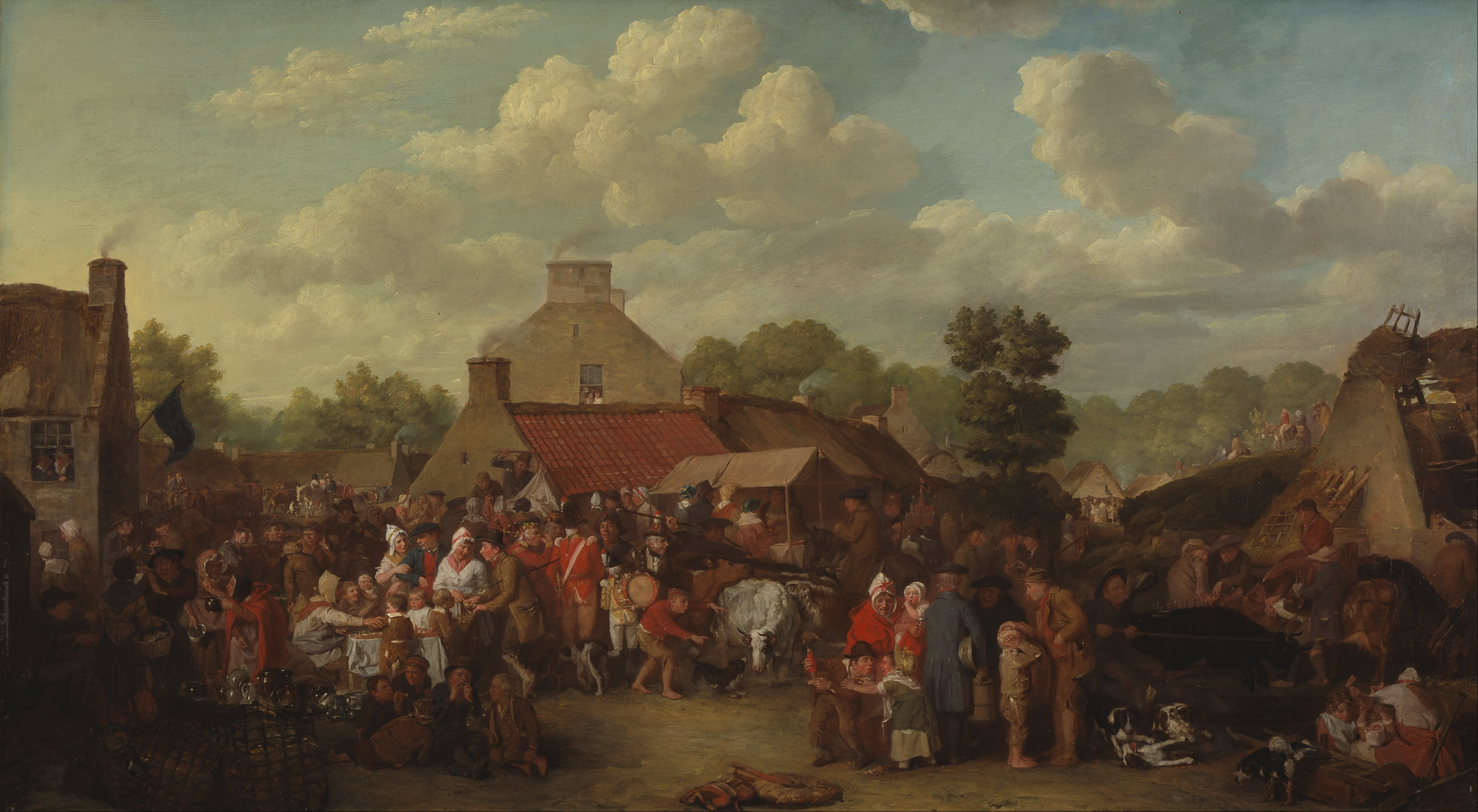
- Artist: David Wilkie
- Year: 1804
- Type: Oil on canvas, genre painting
- Dimensions: 61.5 cm × 110.5 cm (24.2 in × 43.5 in)
- Location: Scottish National Gallery, Edinburgh

Pitlessie Fair is an oil on canvas genre painting by the Scottish artist David Wilkie, from 1804. It is held at the Scottish National Gallery, in Edinburgh.

== History and description ==
It depicts the annual mayfair being held in his native village of Pitlessie, in Fife, Scotland. It is in the collection of the Scottish National Gallery, in Edinburgh, having been purchased in 1921.

Painted when he was 19 years old, its one of his earliest works. It came two years before his major breakthrough at the Royal Academy's Summer Exhibition in 1806 with The Village Politicians. Both paintings show the strong influence that seventeenth century old masters had on Wilkie's work. The success of Pitlessie Fair enabled Wilkie to move to London where he based himself for the rest of his career. Having seen the painting David William Murray, 3rd Earl of Mansfield then commissioned Wilkie to produce The Village Politicians.

== Bibliography ==
- Macdonald, Murdo. Scottish Art. Thames & Hudson, 2021.
- Morton, Graeme. History of Everyday Life in Scotland, 1800 to 1900. Edinburgh University Press, 2010.
- Newman, Gerald & Brown, Leslie Ellen. Britain in the Hanoverian Age, 1714-1837: An Encyclopedia. Taylor & Francis, 1997.
- Tromans, Nicholas. David Wilkie: The People's Painter. Edinburgh University Press, 2007.
