= Thomas Cochrane, 13th Earl of Dundonald =

British Army officer (1886-1958)

The Right Honourable The Earl of Dundonald
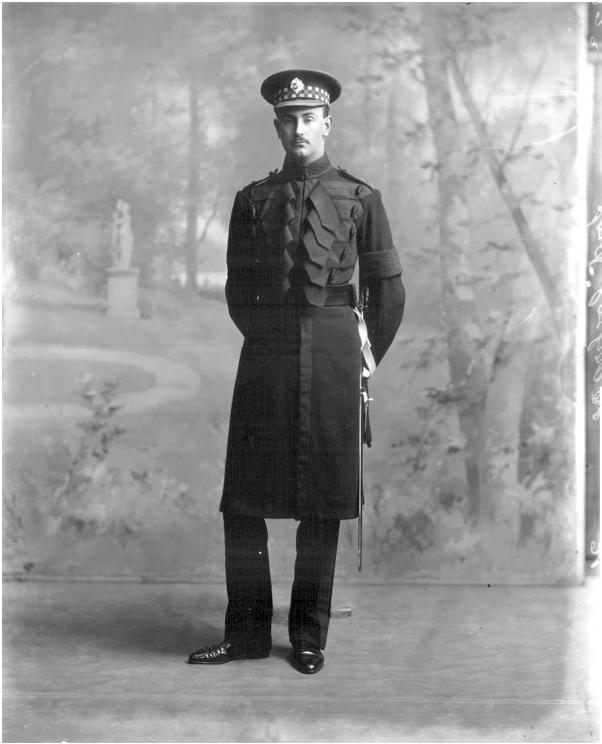
- Tenure: 1935–1958
- Predecessor: Douglas Cochrane, 12th Earl of Dundonald
- Successor: Iain Cochrane, 14th Earl of Dundonald
- Other titles: 13th Lord Cochrane of Paseley and Ochiltrie
- Other names: Lord Dundonald
- Born: 21 February 1886
- Died: 23 May 1958 (aged 72); Montreux, Switzerland
- Residence: Gwrych Castle
- Locality: Conwy county borough, North Wales
- Wars and battles: World War I
- Parents: Douglas Cochrane, 12th Earl of Dundonald; Winifred, Countess of Dundonald
- Occupation: Captain, Scots Guard

Thomas Hesketh Douglas Blair Cochrane, 13th Earl of Dundonald (21 February, 1886 – 23 May, 1958) was a British Army officer who served in World War I. He was also a Scottish representative peer from 1941 to 1955 and chairman of the Anglo-Chilean Society.

== Personal life ==
Thomas Hesketh Douglas Blair Cochrane (nicknamed 'Cocky' by his friends) was born on 21 February, 1886, the son of Douglas Cochrane, 12th Earl of Dundonald and Winifred Bamford-Hesketh (died 1924), he was educated at Eton.

He succeeded to the Earldom of Dundonald and its subsidiary titles of 13th Lord Cochrane of Paseley and Ochiltrie on the death of his father, 12 April 1935. He was a representative peer for Scotland between 1941 and 1955, and was the chairman of the Anglo-Chilean Society.

He lived a secluded life in his later years at his home in Auchans Castle, Ayrshire where he very rarely partook in public affairs. He died unmarried on 23 May 1958 whilst on holiday at Montreux, Switzerland at the age of 72.

== Army ==
He entered the Scots Guard in 1908 and reached the rank of captain, he fought in France in World War I and he was also a General Staff for the Egyptian Expeditionary Force. For his services in the war he was awarded the Order of the Merit of Chile and made a Grand Officer, Order por Servicios Distinguidos of Peru.

In November 1914, Thomas was 'invalided' home after having been wounded while fighting with his regiment at the front line.

== Gwrych Castle ==
The family seat was located at Gwrych Castle. The estate was acquired by the 12th Earl of Dundonald in 1878, through his marriage to Winifred Bamford-Hesketh, sole heiress of Robert Bamford-Hesketh.

In 1919, Cochrane's mother sold portions of the family estate, including surrounding land and mines. When she died in 1924, she left the remainder of the estate to King George V. The King, unable to accept the gift, turned the property over to the Order of St John of Jerusalem. In 1928, the estate was eventually sold back to the 12th Earl of Dundonald for £78,000. During World War II, the estate was used to house 200 Jewish refugee children from the Kindertransport. In 1946, following the war, the 13th Earl of Dundonald, resold the entire estate to Robert Rennie of Chester for £12,000.

Peerage of Scotland
| Preceded by Douglas Cochrane | Earl of Dundonald; 1935–1958 | Succeeded by Iain Cochrane |
