= Baron Cochrane of Cults =

Title in the Peerage of the United Kingdom

Baron Cochrane of Cults, of Crawford Priory in the County of Fife, is a title in the Peerage of the United Kingdom. It was created in 1919 for the Liberal Unionist politician and former Under-Secretary of State for the Home Department, the Hon. Thomas Cochrane. He was the second and youngest son of Thomas Barnes Cochrane, 11th Earl of Dundonald. As of 2017 the title is held by the first Baron's great-grandson, the fifth Baron, who succeeded his father in that year. The fifth Baron is also third in line to the Earl of Dundonald.

Two other members of this branch of the Cochrane family have also gained distinction. Captain the Hon. Sir Archibald Douglas Cochrane, second son of the first Baron, was a naval commander and politician. Air Chief Marshal the Hon. Sir Ralph Cochrane, youngest son of the first Baron, was a notable Royal Air Force commander. Commodore the Honourable Michael Cochrane OBE Royal Navy, younger son of the fourth Baron, has continued the family tradition of Royal Navy service.

The family seat is Cults House, near Cupar, Fife. The former was Crawford Priory, also in Fife.

== Barons Cochrane of Cults (1919) ==
- Thomas Horatio Arthur Ernest Cochrane, 1st Baron Cochrane of Cults (1857–1951)
- Thomas George Frederick Cochrane, 2nd Baron Cochrane of Cults (1883–1968)
- Thomas Charles Anthony Cochrane, 3rd Baron Cochrane of Cults (1922–1990)
- Ralph Henry Vere Cochrane, 4th Baron Cochrane of Cults (1926–2017)
- Thomas Hunter Vere Cochrane, 5th Baron Cochrane of Cults (b. 1957)

The heir presumptive is the present holder's brother, Commodore the Hon. Michael Charles Nicholas Cochrane OBE (b. 1959). His heir apparent is his son Edward Michael Thomas Cochrane (b. 2002).

== Arms ==
Coat of arms of Baron Cochrane of Cults

Crest
A horse passant Argent between two stags' attires Gules.
Escutcheon
Quarterly 1st Argent a chevron Gules between three boars' heads erased Azure armed and langued of the second within a bordure contre-Ermine (Cochrane) 2nd Gules a fess Ermine in chief a stag's antler Or fesseways (Crawford of Kilbirnie) 3rd Gules a fesse chequy Argent and Azure in chief three mullets of the second (Lindsay of the Byres) 4th Argent on a saltire Sable nine lozenges of the field in centre chief a mullet Gules (Blair).
Supporters
Two ermines Ermine.
Motto
(By Virtue Of Labour)

== See also ==
- Earl of Dundonald
- Baron Lamington
