= Thomas Cochrane, 1st Baron Cochrane of Cults =

British politician

The Right Honourable The Lord Cochrane of Cults DL JP
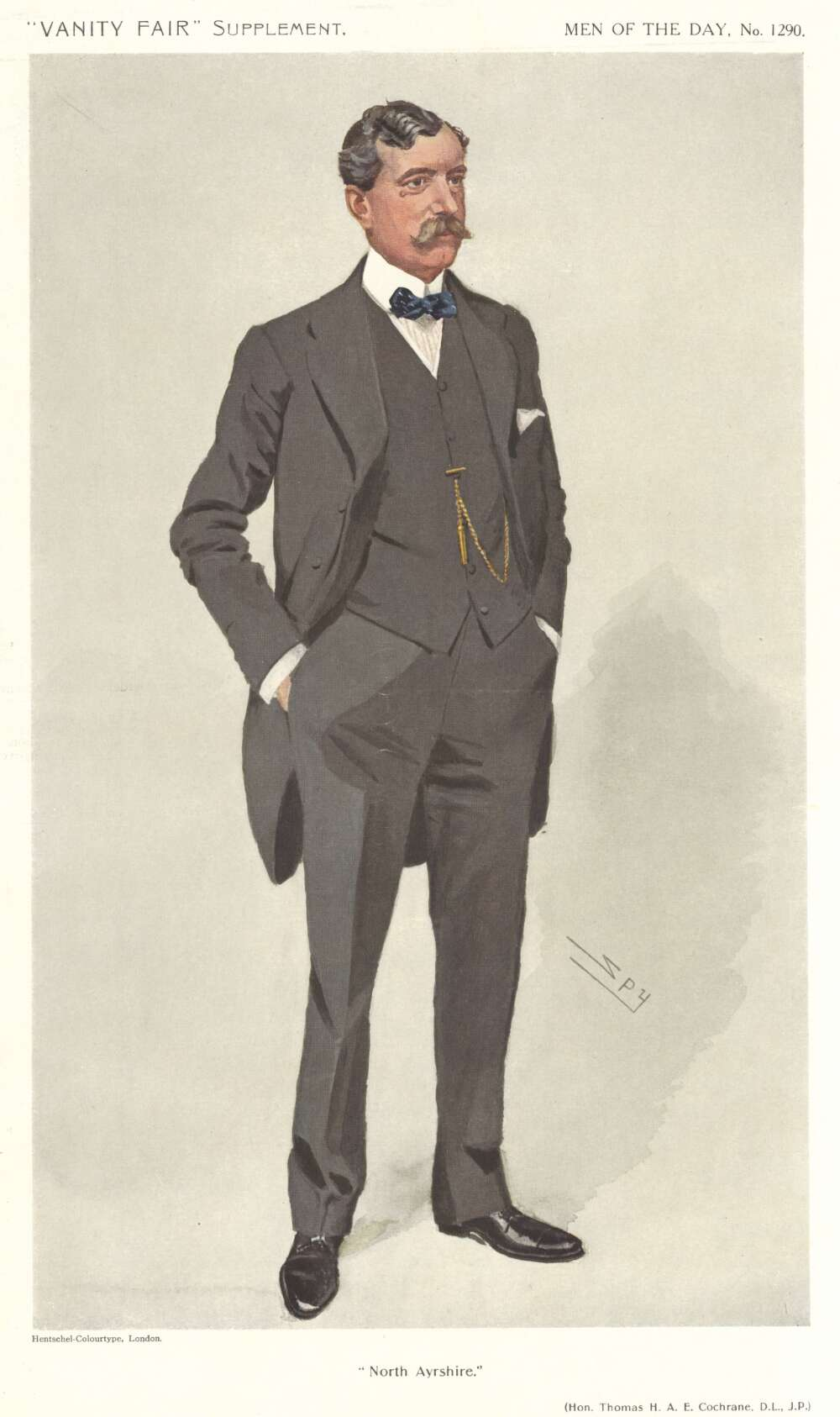
- North Ayrshire, Vanity Fair, 1911

Under-Secretary of State for the Home Department
- In office 11 August 1902 – 4 December 1905
- Monarch: Edward VII
- Prime Minister: Arthur Balfour
- Preceded by: Jesse Collings
- Succeeded by: Herbert Samuel

Personal details
- Born: 2 April 1857
- Died: 17 January 1951 (aged 93)
- Party: Liberal Unionist
- Spouse(s): Lady Gertrude Boyle (1861–1950)

Thomas Horatio Arthur Ernest Cochrane, 1st Baron Cochrane of Cults DL JP (2 April 1857 – 17 January 1951), was a Scottish soldier and Liberal Unionist politician. He was Under-Secretary of State for the Home Department under Arthur Balfour between 1902 and 1905.

== Background and education ==
Cochrane was the second son of Thomas Cochrane, 11th Earl of Dundonald, and Louisa Harriet, daughter of William Mackinnon, and the younger brother of Douglas Cochrane, 12th Earl of Dundonald. He was educated at Eton and Cheltenham College.

== Military career ==
Cochrane was an honorary lieutenant colonel of the 4th Battalion Argyll and Sutherland Highlanders, and served in the 93rd Highlanders and the Scots Guards. He served in the Second Boer War, where he was Deputy Assistant Adjutant-General. He was also a lieutenant colonel of the 2/7 Black Watch from 1914 to 1917.

== Political career ==
Cochrane sat as Unionist Member of Parliament for North Ayrshire from 1892 to 1910. He was Parliamentary Private Secretary to the Colonial Secretary Joseph Chamberlain from 1895 to 1901 and served in Arthur Balfour's Unionist administration as Under-Secretary of State for the Home Department from August 1902 to 1905. In 1919 he was raised to the peerage as Baron Cochrane of Cults, of Crawford Priory in the County of Fife.

Lord Cochrane of Cults was also a Deputy Lieutenant and Justice of the Peace for Fife. In 1934 he was awarded an honorary Doctorate of Law from the University of St Andrews.

== Family ==
Lord Cochrane of Cults married Lady Gertrude, daughter of George Boyle, 6th Earl of Glasgow, in 1880. They had four sons and four daughters, of whom one son and two daughters predeceased their parents. Their second and third sons respectively, Sir Archibald Cochrane and Air Chief Marshal Sir Ralph Cochrane, both gained distinction. Lady Cochrane of Cults was appointed an OBE in 1920. She died in December 1950, aged 89. Lord Cochrane of Cults only survived her by a month and died in January 1951, aged 93. He was succeeded in the barony by his eldest son Major the Hon. Thomas Cochrane.

== Arms ==
Coat of arms of Thomas Cochrane, 1st Baron Cochrane of Cults
Crest A horse passant Argent between two stags' attires Gules. Escutcheon Quarterly 1st Argent a chevron Gules between three boars' heads erased Azure armed and langued of the second within a bordure contre-Ermine (Cochrane) 2nd Gules a fess Ermine in chief a stag's antler Or fesseways (Crawford of Kilbirnie) 3rd Gules a fesse chequy Argent and Azure in chief three mullets of the second (Lindsay of the Byres) 4th Argent on a saltire Sable nine lozenges of the field in centre chief a mullet Gules (Blair). Supporters Two ermines Ermine. Motto (By Virtue Of Labour)

Parliament of the United Kingdom
Preceded by Hon. Hugh Elliot	Member of Parliament for North Ayrshire; 1892 – January 1910	Succeeded by Andrew Anderson
Political offices
Preceded by Jesse Collings	Under-Secretary of State for the Home Department; 1902–1905	Succeeded by Herbert Samuel
Peerage of the United Kingdom
New creation	Baron Cochrane of Cults; 1919–1951	Succeeded by Thomas Cochrane
