= Thomas Cochrane, 11th Earl of Dundonald =

British Army officer and politician (1814-1885)

Captain The Right Honourable The Earl of Dundonald
- Born: 14 April 1814
- Died: 15 January 1885 (aged 70)
- Occupations: Soldier & politician
- Spouse: Louisa Harriet MacKinnon (m. 1847)
- Children: 7 (including Douglas Cochrane, 12th Earl of Dundonald and Thomas Cochrane, 1st Baron Cochrane of Cults)
- Father: Thomas Cochrane, 10th Earl of Dundonald
- Relatives: Ralph Cochrane (grandson); Archibald Cochrane (grandson)
- Military career
- Allegiance: United Kingdom
- Branch: British Army
- Rank: Captain

Captain Thomas Barnes Cochrane, 11th Earl of Dundonald (14 April 1814 – 15 January 1885) was a British Army officer and politician. He was the son of the radical politician and sailor Thomas Cochrane, 10th Earl of Dundonald. As a child he accompanied his father to Chile as a stowaway on the Chilean frigate O'Higgins (1816). In February 1819 the O'Higgins attempted to raid the city of Callao, but was repelled by the coastal fortresses. Thomas Cochrane was almost hit by a cannonball, which instead killed a sailor next to him.

Cochrane joined the British army and eventually rose to the rank of captain. On 31 October 1860, he succeeded his father as the 11th Earl of Dundonald. Between 1879 and 1885, he was a Scottish representative peer.

Thomas's eldest son, Douglas Cochrane learnt of his father's death when he was serving at the Desert March and the Relief of Khartoum.

== Marriage and children ==
Cochrane married, at the British Embassy in Paris on 1 December 1847, Louisa Harriet MacKinnon, daughter of William Alexander Mackinnon, MP, of Mackinnon. The Dowager Countess of Dundonald (as she was known after her husband's death) died 24 February 1902 in her 83rd year. They had seven children:

- Lady Louisa Katherine Emma Cochrane, married Edward O'Neill, 2nd Baron O'Neill, died 10 August 1942 (grandmother of Terence O'Neill, Prime Minister of Northern Ireland)
- Lady Alice Laura Sophia Cochrane, married George Onslow Newton, died 8 December 1914
- Lady Elizabeth Mary Harriet Cochrane, unmarried, died 30 March 1951
- Lady Esther Rose Georgina Cochrane
- Hon. Thomas Alexander Cochrane, born 10 April 1851, died aged 3 months
- Lt. General Douglas Mackinnon Baillie Hamilton Cochrane, 12th Earl of Dundonald
- Lt. Colonel Thomas Horatio Arthur Ernest Cochrane, 1st Baron Cochrane of Cults (father of World War II Air Chief Marshal Ralph Cochrane)

== Notes ==
Peerage of Scotland
Preceded by Thomas Cochrane	Earl of Dundonald; 1860–1885	Succeeded by Douglas Cochrane
