= Fake or Fortune? =

BBC arts documentary television series

- Genre: Documentary
- Presented by: Fiona Bruce; Philip Mould
- Country of origin: United Kingdom
- Original language: English
- No. of series: 14
- No. of episodes: 59

Production
- Producers: Simon Shaw; Robert Murphy; Lucy Swingler
- Running time: 58 minutes
- Production company: BBC Studios Factual Entertainment Productions

Original release
- Network: BBC One
- Release: 19 June 2011 – present

Fake or Fortune? is a British arts documentary television series broadcast on BBC One. Created by art dealer and art historian Philip Mould and producer Simon Shaw, it is presented by Mould and Fiona Bruce. Since its debut in 2011, the series has attracted audiences of up to five million viewers and has been described by the BBC as its "top performing arts series since 2004".. The series investigates the attribution, provenance and authenticity of works of art through archival research, technical and scientific analysis, and specialist expertise. The programme has attracted audiences of more than five million viewers in the United Kingdom.

The investigations draw on specialists including art historians, conservators, conservation scientists, provenance researchers, handwriting experts and museum curators, with contributors varying according to the requirements of each investigation. During the first five series, art historian Bendor Grosvenor carried out specialist research for the programme. From series six onwards, Professor Aviva Burnstock has appeared as a recurring conservation expert.

== Development ==
Fake or Fortune? was created by Philip Mould and his producer Simon Shaw, and is presented by Mould and Fiona Bruce. It was inspired by Mould's 2009 book Sleuth, after which the programme was originally to be titled. According to Mould, Shaw suggested the format after a fisherman brought in a watercolour painting he had found near a rubbish tip to BBC's Antiques Roadshow where Mould identified it as a genuine Homer valued at £30,000. (Note: The full story surrounding the painting, now known as Children Under a Palm, was detailed in the second episode of the first series, named Homer.)

Since its debut in 2011, the series has investigated the attribution, provenance and authenticity of works of art through archival research, technical and scientific analysis, and specialist expertise. In each episode Mould and Bruce focus their attention on a painting (or a group of paintings), usually related to one particular artist. They travel around the country and the world, studying the artists at exhibitions, meeting international experts and following local leads. Series 7, episode 5 saw the show tackle their first sculpture, a work attributed to Alberto Giacometti.

The team was assisted by art historian Bendor Grosvenor for the first five series, until a disagreement over his new BBC Four series Britain's Lost Masterpieces ended his involvement after five series in 2016. The programme has also regularly featured expert conservator Simon Gillespie (see, for example, Series 4). From Series 6 professor Aviva Burnstock, Head of the Department of Conservation and Technology at the Courtauld Institute of Art, became a recurring advisor and expert.

Together and separately the team investigates the paintings on a number of fronts: establishing the provenance of the piece by working backwards from present day to the time of the work's creation; on a forensic level, with investigation and scientific tests on the materials used to help establish specific time frames; and examining the unique painting styles and quirks of the artist. This evidence is then presented to the established authority for each artist to help demonstrate the legitimacy of the work and its possible addition to the relevant catalogue raisonné.

The team does not always succeed. Philip Mould considered the Series 4 case of a painting by Churchill as one of the most unsatisfactory endings to date, before it was finally authenticated in 2020.

On 16 January 2025, the BBC announced that they had put the series' tender up for auction as part of their "competitive tender" policy, allowing independent companies to bid on production of the program.

== Series overview ==
Series	Episodes	Originally released	
Series	Episodes	First released	Last released
1	4	19 June 2011	10 July 2011
2	3	16 September 2012	30 September 2012
3	4	19 January 2014	9 February 2014
4	4	5 July 2015	26 July 2015
5	4	17 July 2016	28 August 2016
6	3	20 August 2017	10 September 2017
7	5	12 August 2018	9 September 2018
8	4	25 July 2019	15 August 2019
9	4	28 July 2021	18 August 2021
10	4	23 August 2022	13 September 2022
11	4	26 September 2023	17 October 2023
12	4	26 September 2024	17 October 2024
13	6	21 July 2025	25 August 2025
14	6	16 July 2026	26 August 2026

== Episodes ==
=== Series 1 (2011) ===
No. overall	No. in series	Title	Produced and directed by	Original release date	UK viewers (millions)
1	1	"Monet"	Nicky Illis	19 June 2011	4.04
The authenticity of the painting Bords de la Seine à Argenteuil allegedly by Claude Monet. The Wildenstein Institute, presented with considerable evidence of the painting's authenticity, controversially rejected it as a Monet and was criticised by Philip Mould. (The owner subsequently sued the Institute, but lost.)
2	2	"Homer"	Nicola Lafferty	26 June 2011	3.96
Local resident Tony Varney found a water colour featuring three children in exotic garb just outside the Youghal landfill site in the 1980s. Years later, in 2008, he had given it to his daughter Selina and they brought it to BBC's Antiques Roadshow the first year of Fiona Bruce hosting, where Philip Mould identified it as by Winslow Homer, one of America's most important 19th-century artists, valuing it at £30,000. In this episode, three years later, Bruce and Mould investigates further as the painting is put up for auction at Sotheby's. Other scraps found with the painting point toward Sir Henry Blake, colonial governor of the Bahamas in the 1880s, and his wife Lady Blake. When Mould visits the archives of The Nassau Guardian he finds a short description of a costume party held at the governor's residence. Mr Homer is listed in attendance, and the Blake children's exotic garb is described, much like what's in the painting, now known as Children Under a Palm. Mould then visits Sotheby's in New York and learns the painting is accepted as genuine, with a starting price significantly higher than his earlier valuation. Turns out, the Blakes retired to Myrtle Grove, Youghal, just three miles from the rubbish dump where it was found. At the last minute, descendants of the Blake family contest the sale, giving Selina Varney only minutes to either agree to give them 70% of the proceeds or they would stop the sale. As of 2022 the painting remained in Sotheby's possession with the court battle for the ownership ongoing.
3	3	"Van Meegeren"	Nicky Illis	3 July 2011	4.1
The authenticity of the painting The Procuress, owned by the Courtauld Institute. It was determined to be a forgery committed by Han van Meegeren.
4	4	"Rembrandt"	Ben Southwell	10 July 2011	3.8
Man in an Oriental Costume, once attributed to Rembrandt as a portrait of the artist's father, was on sale in an auction house in Cape Town, South Africa. The painting was identified as a work looted by the Nazis and was reattributed to Isaac de Jouderville.

Works featured in series 1

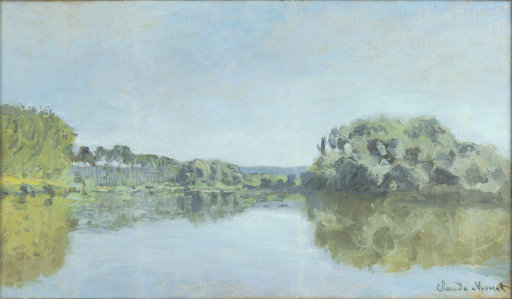
Bords de la Seine à Argenteuil

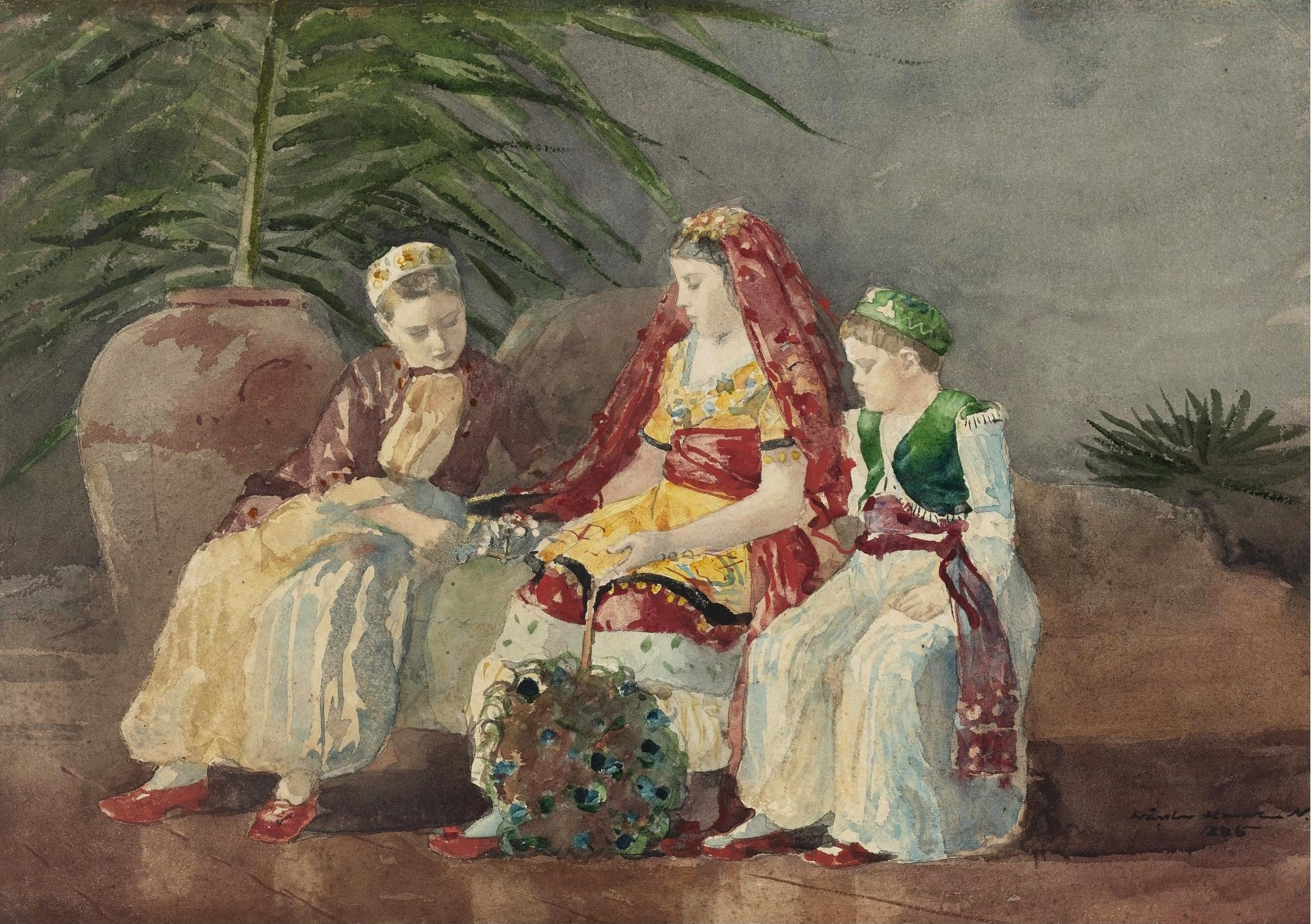
Children Under a Palm Tree by Winslow Homer

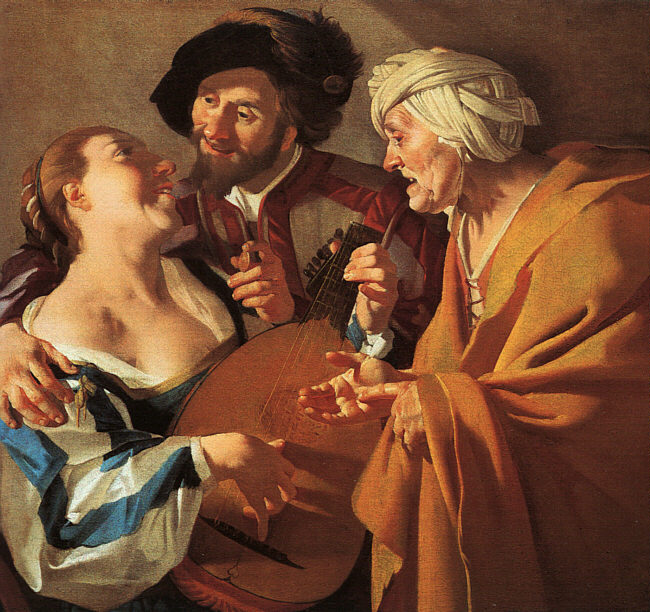
The Procuress by Han van Meegeren

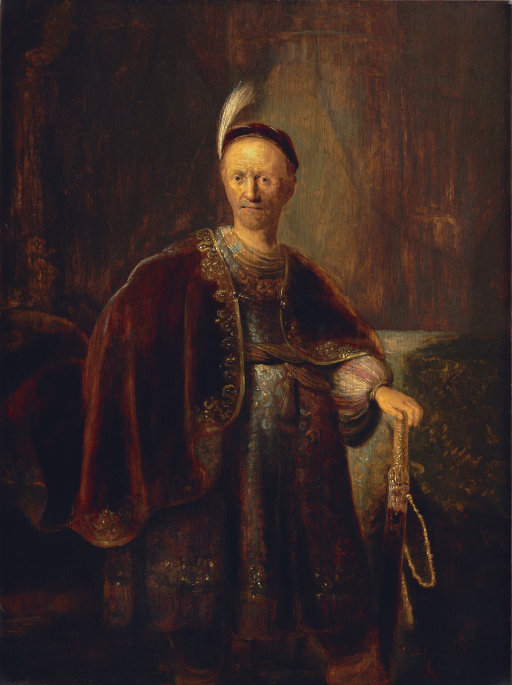
Man in an Oriental Costume by Isaac de Jouderville

=== Series 2 (2012) ===
No. overall	No. in series	Title	Produced and directed by	Original release date	UK viewers (millions)
5	1	"Degas and the Little Dancer"	Robert Murphy	16 September 2012	3.83
Danseuse Bleue et Contrebasses, with an apparent signature by Edgar Degas. It had been bought as a Degas in 1948 with an outline provenance going back to the artist's studio. Scientific analysis of the paint confirmed that it was consistent with the 1890s. Research confirmed the provenance, and the painting was accepted as an authentic Degas and added to the catalogue raisonné.
6	2	"Turner: A Miscarriage of Justice?"	Nicky Illis	23 September 2012	4.1
Three paintings attributed to J. M. W. Turner, The Beacon Light, Off Margate and Margate Jetty, in the collection of the National Museum of Wales. These had been donated by two sisters: Gwendoline and Margaret Davies. In the 1950s, they had been judged to be fake, but as a result of the programme's research, they are now accepted as genuine.
7	3	"Van Dyck: What Lies Beneath"	Rachel Jardine	30 September 2012	4.37
A portrait of Queen Henrietta Maria, as St Catherine attributed to Anthony van Dyck, belonging to Mould. This was shown to be an incomplete portrait of Queen Henrietta Maria (wife of Charles I) which had later been enlarged and painted over.

Works featured in series 2

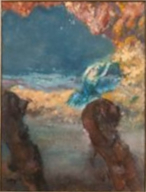
Danseuse Bleue et Contrebasses by Edgar Degas

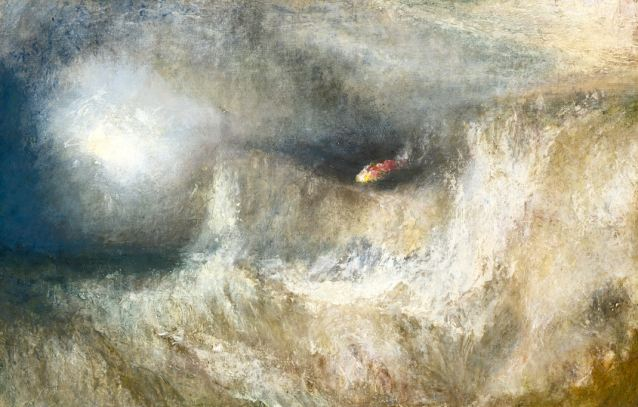
The Beacon Light by J. M. W. Turner

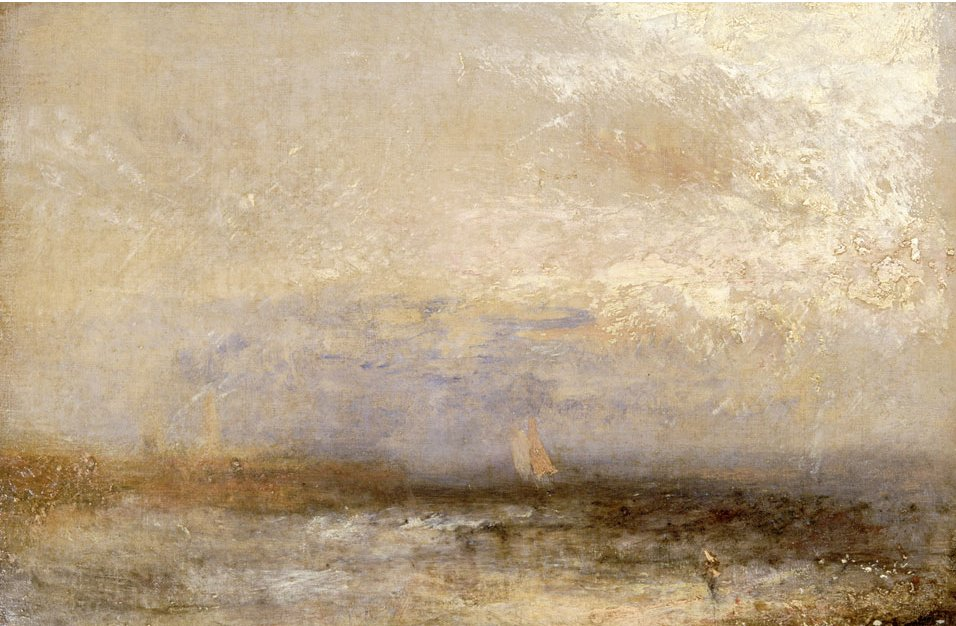
Off Margate by J. M. W. Turner

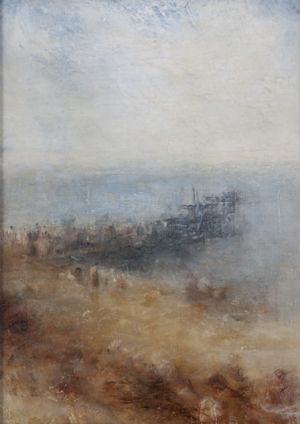
Margate Jetty by J. M. W. Turner

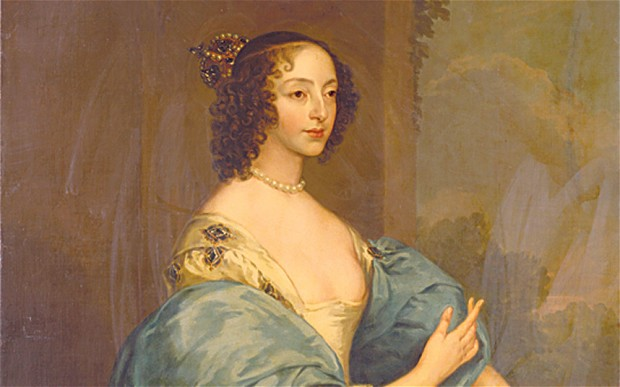
Portrait of Queen Henrietta Maria, as St Catherine attributed to Anthony van Dyck (before restoration)

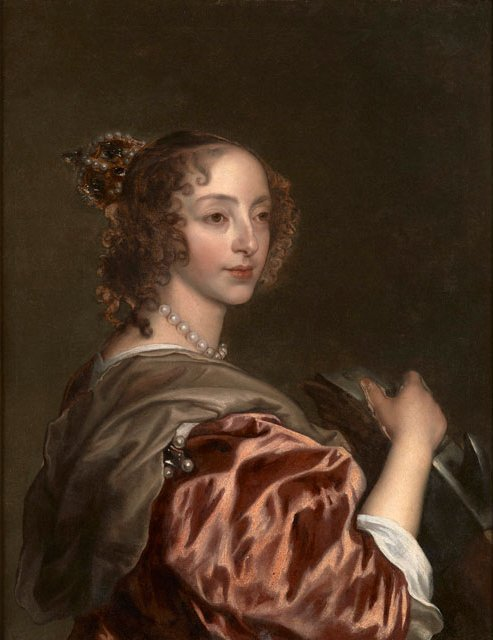
Portrait of Queen Henrietta Maria, as St Catherine attributed to Anthony van Dyck (after restoration)

=== Series 3 (2014) ===
The third series features four episodes. The first episode was first shown on 27 December 2013 on Sweden's SVT, with episodes 2 and 3 shown in the following weeks. Philip Mould described the appearance on Swedish television weeks ahead of the British premiere as a "weird BBC World cock-up". SVT on its website described the programme at the time as a "Brittisk dokumentärserie från 2012" (British documentary from 2012).

No. overall	No. in series	Title	Produced and directed by	Original release date	UK viewers (millions)
8	1	"Vuillard"	Nicky Illis	19 January 2014	4.58
One of a group of paintings reputedly by French post-impressionist Édouard Vuillard, purchased speculatively by a writer, Keith Tutt. The investigation unearths documentation proving the painting is genuine and worth approximately £250,000. The Wildenstein Institute panel unanimously accepted Tutt's painting as Vuillard's work. The programme also shows that the painting is part of a pair, the other having been sold by the previous owner on eBay.
9	2	"Constable"	Robert Murphy	26 January 2014	N/A
Two different paintings attributed to John Constable, one of Yarmouth Jetty and the other called A Sea Beach Brighton. The former turns out to be "most likely" by Constable, but heavily overpainted by another hand; the latter, formerly in the Boston Museum of Fine Arts until sold in the 1990s, is deemed a genuine Constable.
10	3	"Chagall"	Robert Murphy	2 February 2014	4.48
Nude, 1909–10 was bought by a Leeds property developer in the belief that it was a genuine but unauthenticated work by Marc Chagall. Forensic tests showed that it was painted with pigments not available at the time it was purported to have been painted. It was submitted to the "Chagall Committee", who ruled that it was a fake and ordered its destruction.
11	4	"Gainsborough"	Ben Southwell	9 February 2014	N/A
The team investigate two paintings from the Your Paintings web site, Imaginary Landscape and Portrait of Joseph Gape, attempting to show they were by Thomas Gainsborough. They successfully convinced Hugh Belsey, the world's leading Gainsborough expert, after he deemed Imaginary Landscape to be a Gainsborough drawing that was reworked in the 19th century, while the portrait was considered a lost Gainsborough painting.

Selected works featured in series 3

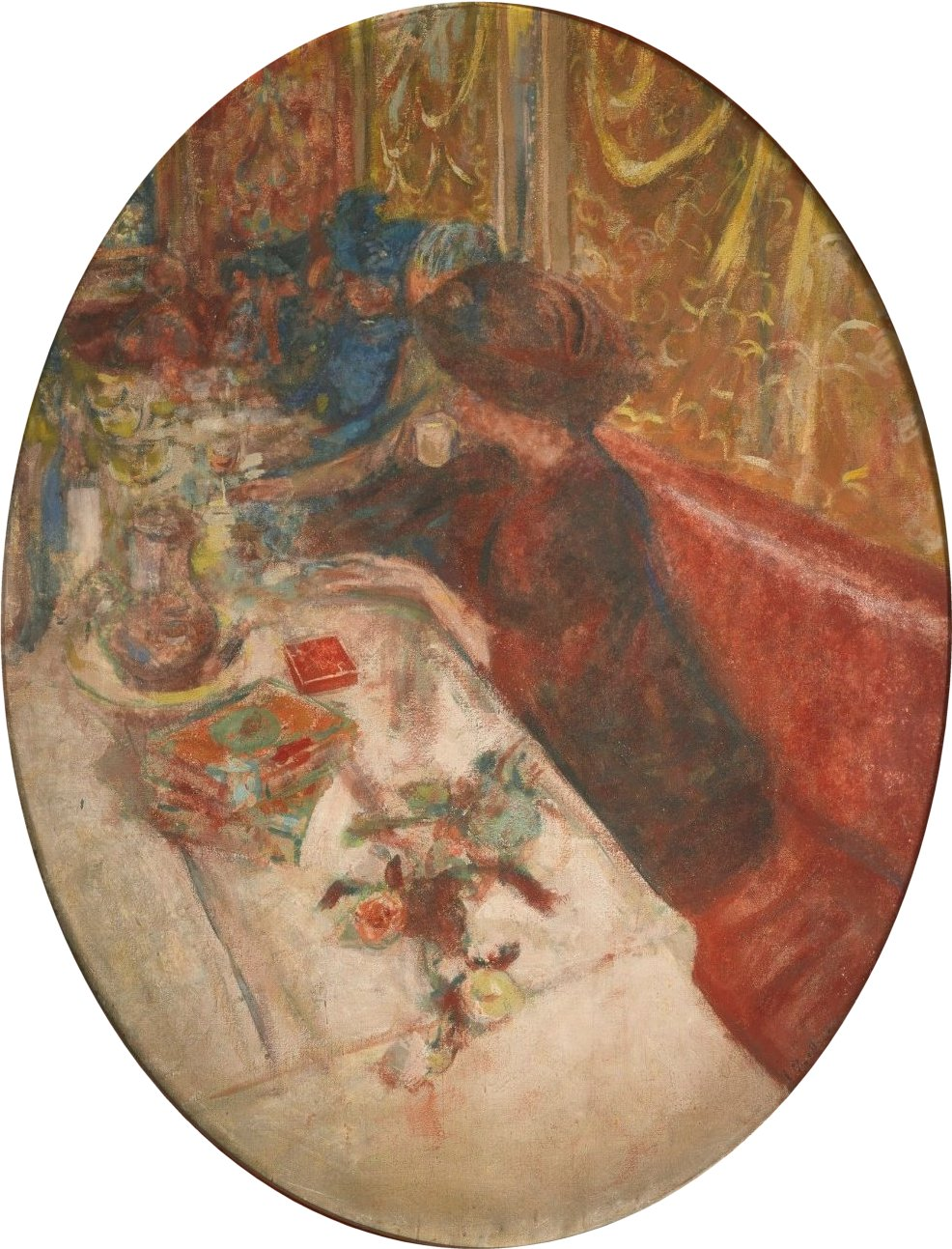
The Café (1918) by Édouard Vuillard

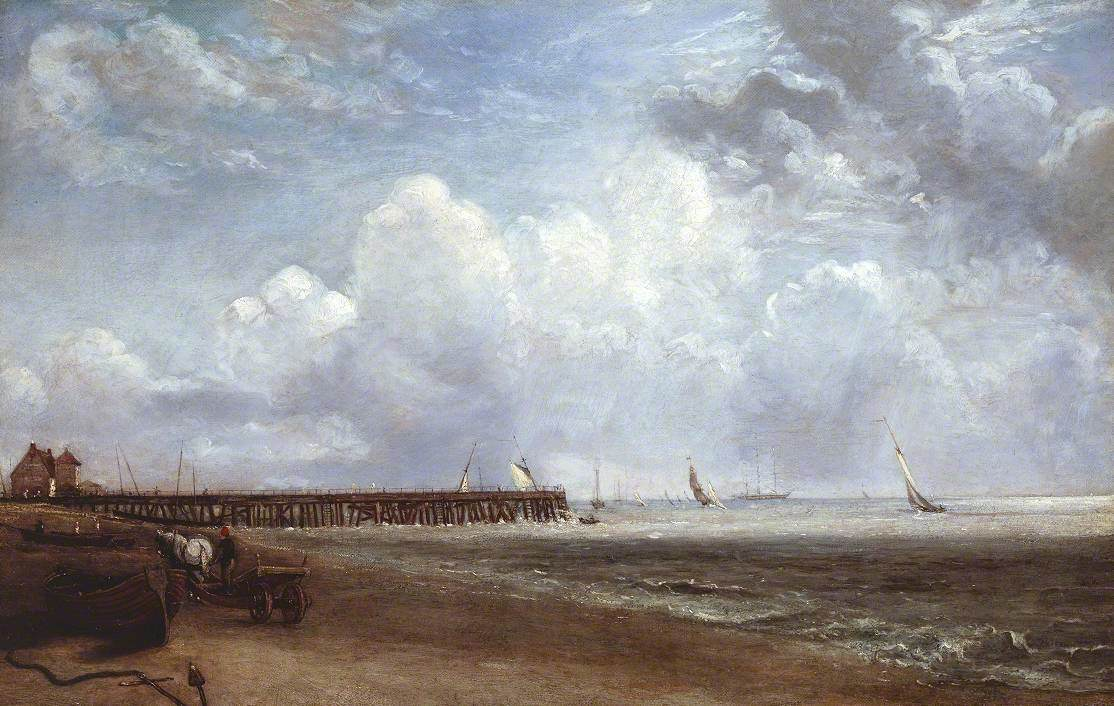
Yarmouth Jetty by John Constable

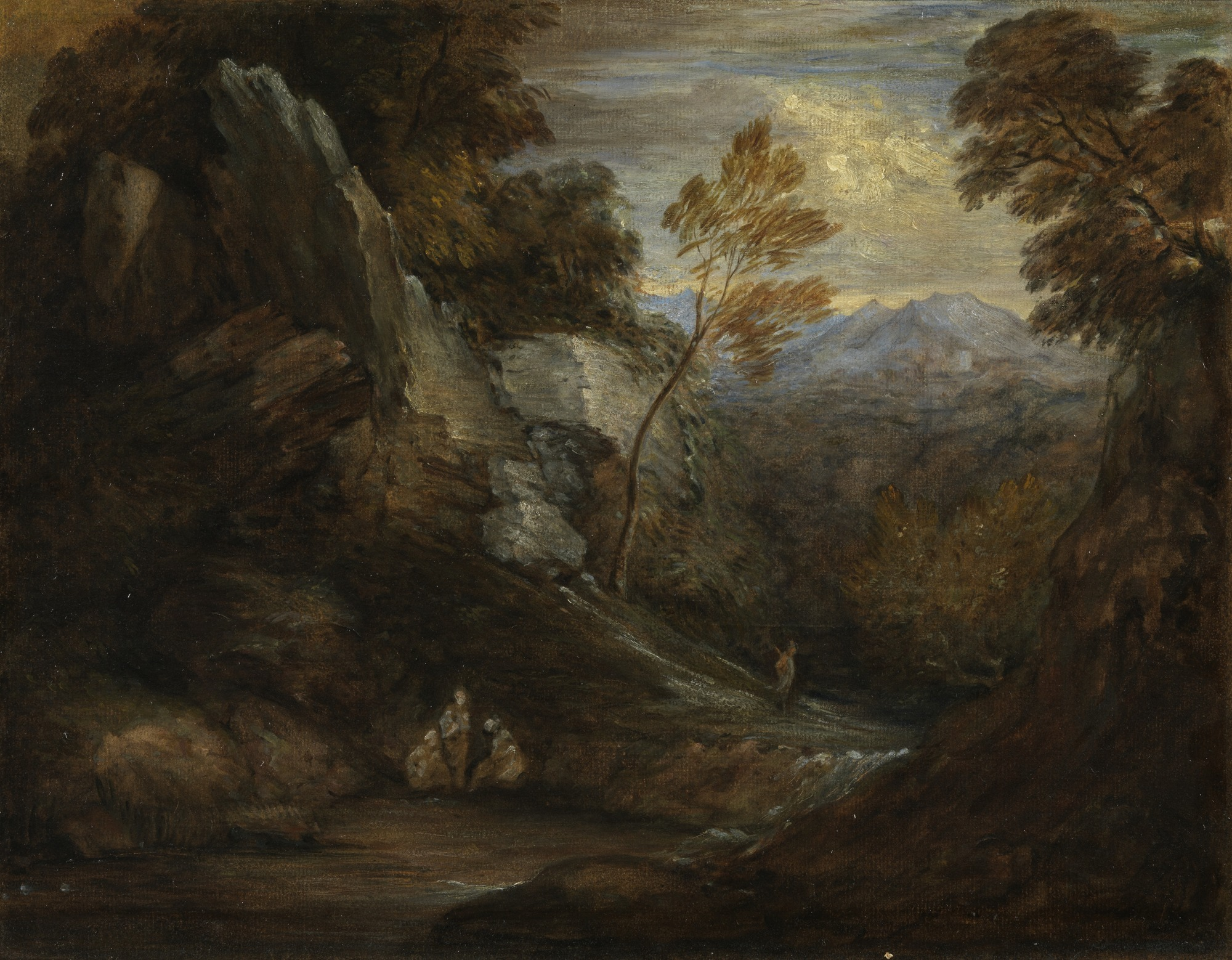
Imaginary Landscape by Thomas Gainsborough

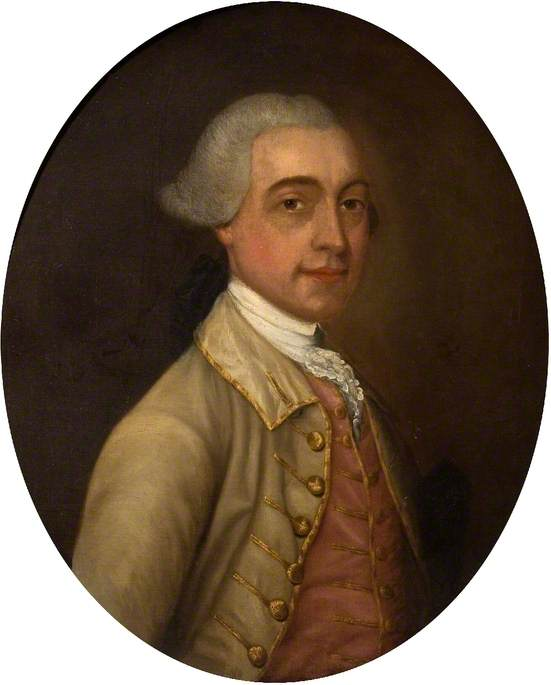
Portrait of Joseph Gape by Thomas Gainsborough

=== Series 4 (2015) ===
No. overall	No. in series	Title	Produced and directed by	Original release date	UK viewers (millions)
12	1	"Lowry"	Rachel Jardine	5 July 2015	4.85
Experts determined whether three works - Lady with Dogs, Darby and Joan and Crowd Scene - were genuine paintings by L. S. Lowry or forgeries. They had been bought in the early 1970s by a Cheshire businessman, Gerald Ames. Lowry was described as "probably the most faked British artist, his deceptively simple style of painting making him a soft target for forgers." Experts analysed the paint used in one of the paintings, but the white paint did not match the flake white Lowry claimed to have always used. Lowry claimed to have only used five colours, flake white (lead white), ivory black, vermillion red, Prussian blue and yellow ochre, produced by Winsor & Newton. Photographic evidence from the 1950s, however, showed that he had experimented with both titanium white and zinc white: Darby and Joan contained traces of zinc white. The same painting was also plainly visible in a contemporary BBC documentary film. All three paintings were deemed genuine works by Lowry.
13	2	"Renoir"	Nicky Illis	12 July 2015	5.3
Nicky Philipps, an artist noted for her pictures of the royal family, asks the team to investigate a painting which hangs on the walls of Picton Castle in Pembrokeshire, once the Philipps family seat. Two catalogues raisonnés of the works of Renoir disagreed about the authenticity of an unsigned work, known as Boats on the Seine at Argenteuil. Despite an inclusion on the catalogue of Bernheim-Jeune Galerie, the team are unsuccessful in changing the opinion of the Wildenstein Institute.
14	3	"A Mystery Old Master"	Francis Welch	19 July 2015	4.6
The team members investigate a pietà, a monumental painting of the Lamentation of Christ, that hangs in St John the Baptist Church in Tunstall, Lancashire. After research in Venice and elsewhere, the 16th-century painting is discovered to be by Francesco Montemezzano. It was probably donated to the church in the early 19th century by Frederick Needham (the church's vicar from 1810 to 1816), who was a half-brother of the church's patron, Richard Toulmin North of Thurland Castle near Tunstall.
15	4	"Munnings and Churchill"	Simon Mansfield	26 July 2015	5.3
Charles Henty seeks to validate the provenance of two inherited paintings, one by Alfred Munnings and one by Winston Churchill, discovered in a coal hole of a house in Ebury Street. Philip Mould visits David Coombs, a leading expert on the art of Churchill, who is unconvinced by the painting on account of the unfamiliarly well painted figures. He is particularly concerned by the colouring which, he feels, is tonally dissimilar to Churchill's accepted œuvre. In France, the team discover that the painting is of the Fountain of Saint-Paul in Saint-Paul-de-Vence. They are introduced to Joy Lutenbacher, who recalls that her aunt, Joan Smith, witnessed Churchill paint the fountain and provides a signed photo of Churchill given to her aunt, dated October 1945. Bendor Grosvenor also finds supporting evidence in a 1949 newsreel. Despite this evidence, Coombs' initial 'serious misgivings' have not disappeared, and he decides to include the painting in his catalogue raisonné, although only in the 'Mysteries' section. (Note: In September 2020, the painting was finally authenticated after a thumbnail photograph of it had been discovered at Chartwell, Churchill's family home in Kent.) Munnings' painting Dedham Winter Landscape is found to be of a scene which the artist painted more than five times. In a twist of fate, the church depicted in the painting is the final resting place of a notorious art forger, Tom Keating, who was known to have forged Munnings' work. However, this is a mere coincidence and experts Lorian Peralta-Ramos and Dr Bill Teatheredge agree that the painting should be accepted as a work by Munnings.

Selected works featured in series 4

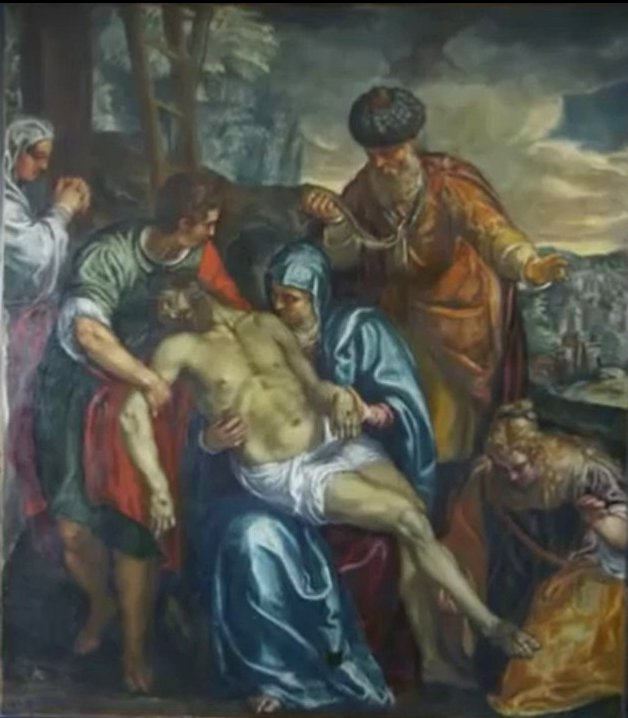
The Deposition by Francesco Montemezzano

=== Series 5 (2016) ===
Filming for the fifth series started on 24 November 2015.

No. overall	No. in series	Title	Produced and directed by	Original release date	UK viewers (millions)
16	1	"Freud"	Rachel Jardine	17 July 2016	4.63
A portrait purportedly done by Lucian Freud is brought to the attention of the team. However, an outright denial by Freud himself looms over the team; the artist claimed he never painted the artwork under investigation. Faced with repudiating the words of the artist himself, the team trace the painting back to Freud's time during his teenage years at East Anglian School of Painting and Drawing, just before the outbreak of World War II. Fiona finds out through both a previous work's history and through an interview with Freud's daughter that Freud didn't consider works he finished himself to be worthy of his attention, especially ones where someone else had done work on his artwork, suggesting a reason for his denial. Despite the hope of DNA evidence by an embedded hair in the painting not panning out, notes from Freud's solicitor and forensic evidence of the paint and the paint strokes indicate most of the painting was done by one hand, possibly done on an abandoned canvas that already was painted beforehand at the art school Freud attended and then discarded to the side. In the end, when presented with the collected evidence, a panel of three experts on Freud's work deem the painting to have been mostly done by Freud, significantly increasing its value at auction.
17	2	"Delaroche"	Nicky Illis	24 July 2016	4.84
A woman asks the team to prove a work, Saint Amelia, Queen of Hungary, housed at Castle of Park in Aberdeenshire, was painted by Paul Delaroche. The painting was acquired by the woman's late husband when he worked for Christie's back in the 1980s, but he never managed to get it authenticated before he died. Delaroche did paint Saint Amelia as a royal commission done for Maria Amalia, wife of Louis Philippe I, before they were deposed in 1848. The artwork could thus be a lost work from the French Revolution of 1848. The alternative Philip needs to investigate is if it is instead a (legitimate) copy done by a contemporary painter, as Delaroche proved popular to replicate. At Claremont in Surrey, where Queen Victoria offered the deposed couple refuge from the Revolution, Bendor reveals that the artwork in question did reach English shores, as it is prominently displayed in an 1866 watercolour of Maria Amalia's bedroom by historical artist Joseph Nash. Differences in colour to known copies of the painting are scientifically explained by pigment degradation. Though the team is unable to establish the provenance between the death of Maria Amalia's son in 1896 and the 1980s purchase, the painting is still deemed to be a genuine Delaroche and the lost work of Maria Amalia. In an 11th hour surprise, the appraiser reveals a letter written by Delaroche where he detailed how he was disgusted at the pitiful state of the picture when he saw it while looking over the commission of a stained glass window version of his artwork and undertook the task of restoring the picture back to its former state, thus explaining the rest of the artefacts revealed by the forensic analysis. The painting was sold via Christie's in July 2019 for £33,750.
18	3	"Rodin"	Francis Welch	31 July 2016	4.31
A Lincolnshire resident asks the team to investigate a sketch that is purported to be done by Auguste Rodin. Known primarily for sculptures like The Kiss and The Thinker, Rodin was also accomplished as an artist in other forms, his best known work being a series of sketches of a Cambodian dance troupe that toured in Paris around the turn of the 20th century. The drawing was inherited from the owner's mother while she was living in Mexico in the 1940s after doing some work for the interior of a restaurant. Bendor's research reveals that of an estimated 150 Cambodian sketches done by Rodin, 120 are in the Musée Rodin and 21 authentic works are in other museums, which leaves fewer than 10 in private hands. In addition, Rodin was an often-counterfeited artist in both his sculptures and artwork. The name Ernest Durig pops up in the research: at the time, he was known as a respectable sculptor and art dealer, but long after the drawing was given to the owner's mother, Durig was exposed as a prolific forger of Rodin; his name was most recently at the centre of a Rodin sketches forgery scandal at the Musée d'Orsay in 2014. Going to the Musée Rodin, Fiona finds out that the dancers had mesmerized Rodin so much that one series of sketches was done on wrapping paper obtained from a greengrocer, due to his forgetting his sketch paper. When looking at several other sketches, Philip latches on to a particular technique of Rodin, where he blotted the watercolours with minimal strokes while making the dancers seem to be floating. Denied access to a cache of Durig sketches at MoMA for comparison, a signature expert casts more doubt, leading Fiona to reveal that Rodin would leave it up to recipients of his sketches to make their own signature, as he couldn't be cared to sign his works. The appraiser who revealed the Rodin fakes at the Musée d'Orsay deems the sketch to be not by Rodin, but by the forger Durig.
19	4	"Portraits"	Robert Murphy	21 August 2016	4.22
The team focuses three portraits – the first of a young lady that is attributed to Philip Mercier, the second of a formidable-looking man said to have been painted by Adolph von Menzel, and the third of a child believed to have been painted by Willem de Kooning. Together with specialist Dr Bendor Grosvenor, they conclude that Portrait of a Lady was painted by Mercier (increasing its value from £50 to £5,000) and that The Old General was a clever forgery. In the third case, the team feels that Portrait of a Child likely was by de Kooning. However, they can not get it authenticated, or even clear up its prior ownership. Unless the current owners can prove that the person they bought it from had the legal right to sell it, they might not actually own the painting.

Selected works featured in series 5

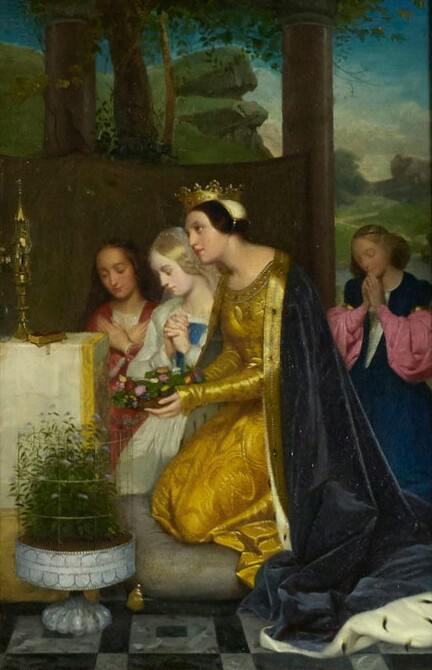
Saint Amelia, Queen of Hungary by Delaroche

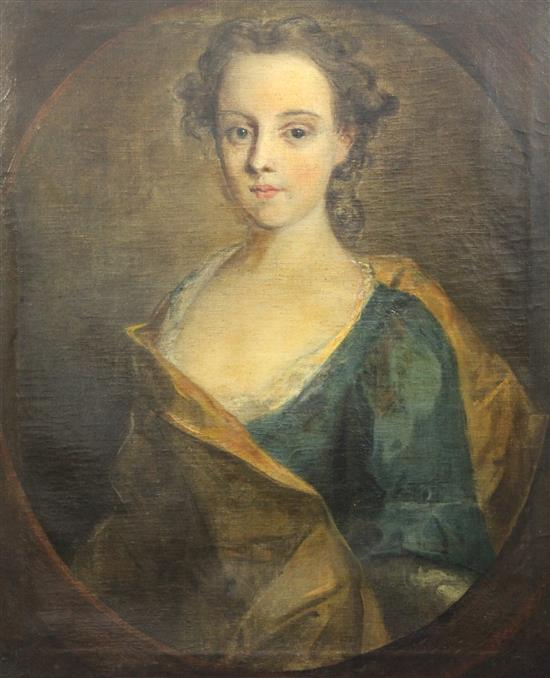
Portrait of a Lady by Philip Mercier

=== Series 6 (2017) ===
The series was originally planned to have four episodes; "Giacometti" was postponed. It would premiere as part of series 7 in 2018, and be rebroadcast as part of series 8 in 2019.

No. overall	No. in series	Title	Produced and directed by	Original release date	UK viewers (millions)
20	1	"Constable"	Nicky Illis	20 August 2017	5.15
A painting of Willy Lott's Cottage, previously bought and sold, twice, by Philip Mould is shown to be by John Constable. Mould's previous attempts to prove this had failed to convince experts. Its provenance, from the current owner all the way back to Constable's estate, via the Doheny family, whisky distiller Tommy Dewar and soap manufacturer Thomas J. Barratt, is established. Stylistic details, verified by Constable experts Annie Lyles and Sarah Cove, date the painting to the correct period. Mould, who sold the painting for £35,000 in 2000, is sanguine about losing out on its estimated £2million value.
21	2	"Tom Roberts"	Francis Welch	3 September 2017	4.57
Queensland residents Joe and Rosanna Natoli bought a painting with the signature "Tom Roberts" at auction for £7,500. Expert opinion after the purchase, however, was that it was not by the important Australian impressionist of that name. Infrared examination revealed that the back had the title Rejected, the name Tom Roberts and an address in London's Haymarket that was shown to be Roberts' address while studying at the Royal Academy of Arts. Roberts' sketchbooks showed initial studies which appeared to be preliminaries for the work under investigation. One of the leading authorities on Roberts' work, Mary Eagle of the Art Gallery of New South Wales, accepts it as genuine and Mould values it in excess of £200,000. The work was later offered for private sale through Philip Bacon Galleries in Brisbane.
22	3	"Gauguin"	Rachel Jardine	10 September 2017	4.77
The team investigate two possible works by Paul Gauguin which have been brought to their attention. Femme accroupie, believed to be the first pencil sketch for Gauguin's Tahitian painting When Will You Marry?, was formerly in the possession of German-born British art historian Alfred Scharf and later owned by his granddaughter. Its authenticity was initially disputed, as it appeared similar to a sketch contained in Gauguin's notebook. Research subsequently established a provenance linking the work directly to Gauguin and later to his friend and fellow artist Francisco Durrio. The drawing was determined to have been removed from Gauguin's sketchbook between 1916 and 1932. It was offered for sale at the Leicester Galleries in 1931, purchased by Lord Ivor Spencer-Churchill, and later acquired by Scharf. The work has been accepted as genuine by the Wildenstein Institute. The second possible Gauguin is a still life depicting a bowl of fruit which had been sold as a genuine Gauguin several times and had appeared in a catalogue raisonné. However, the signature and dedication had been added after the original paint had dried and the signature did not appear genuine. The sale in which it had first appeared included a number of works now attributed to other artists. Connoisseurship also raises doubts about the style and Mould and Bruce conclude that it is not genuine.

Selected works featured in series 6

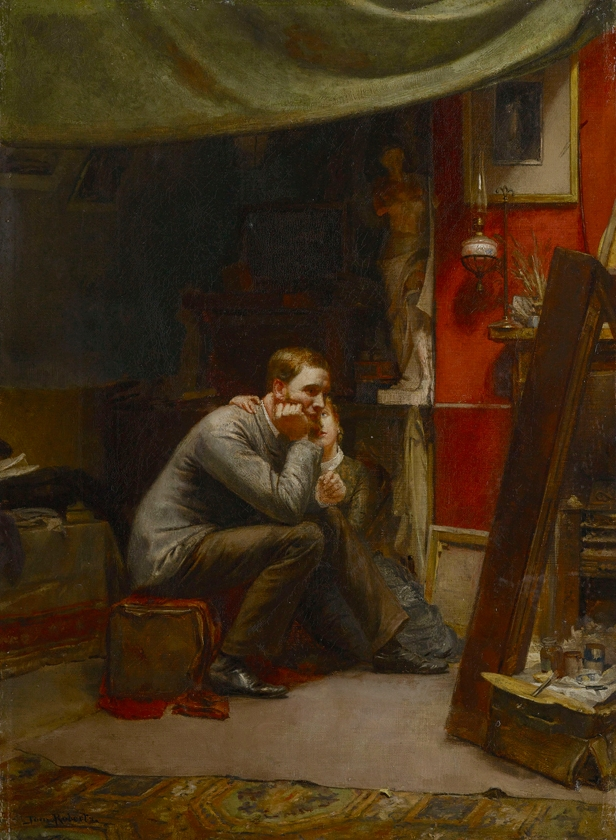
Rejected by Tom Roberts

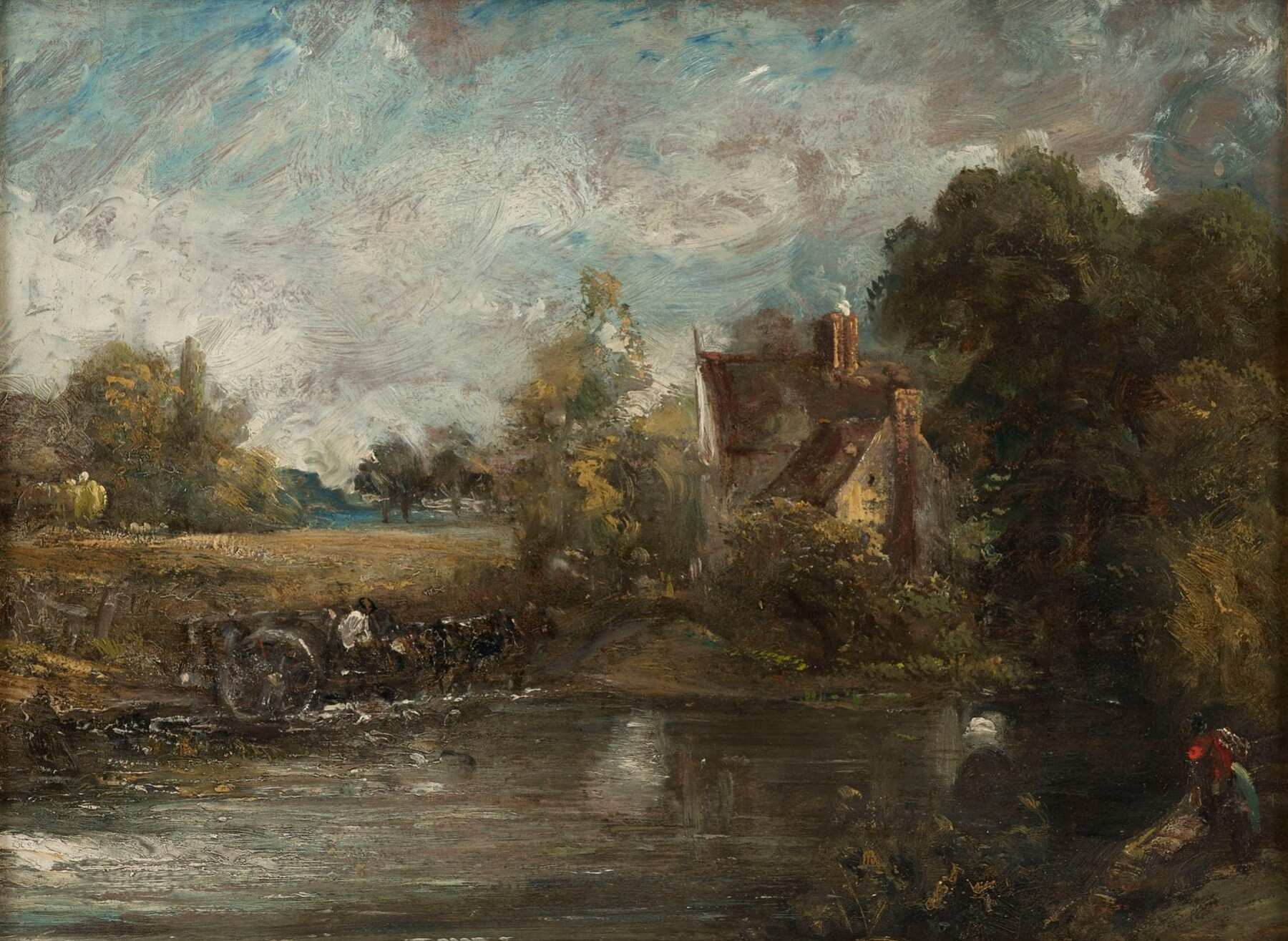
Willy Lott's Cottage by John Constable

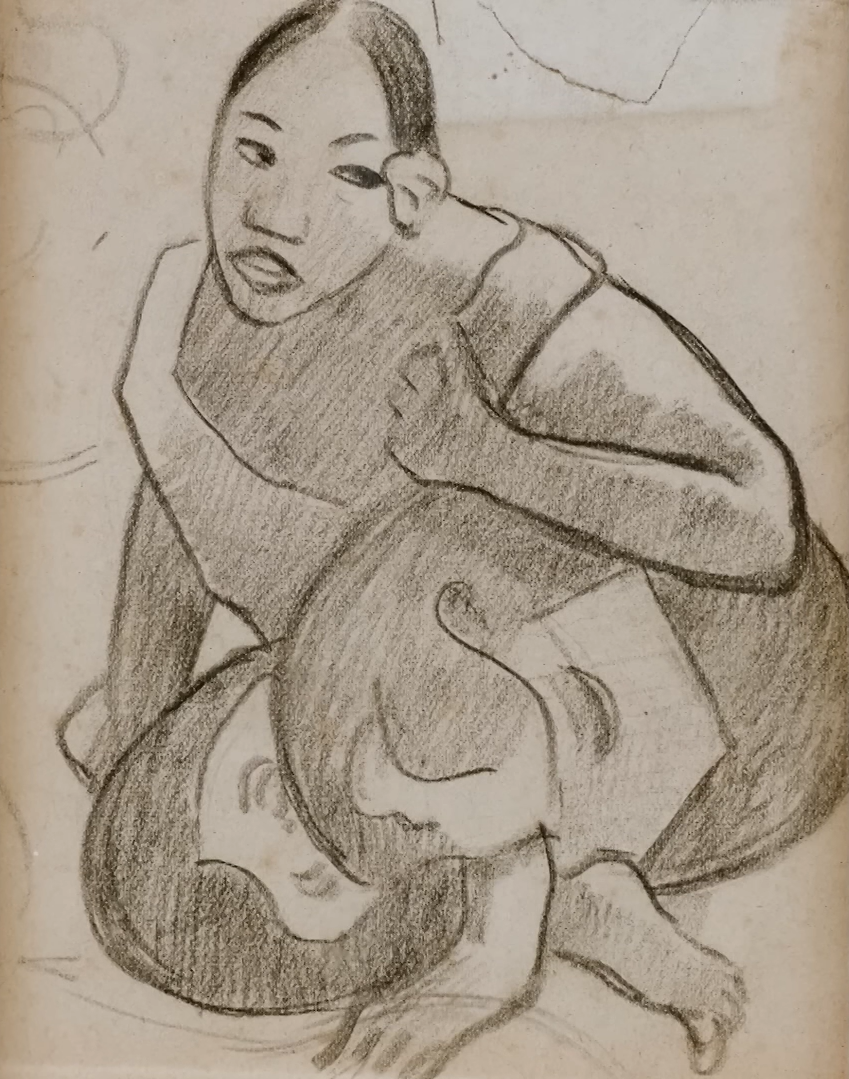
Femme accroupie by Paul Gauguin

=== Series 7 (2018) ===
No. overall	No. in series	Title	Produced and directed by	Original release date	UK viewers (millions)
23	1	"Nicholson"	Nicky Illis	12 August 2018	4.21
A still-life painting of a glass jug, plates and two pears was purchased by a woman in 2006 as a William Nicholson work for £165,000. She bought it from Browse & Darby, the gallery founded by her late aunt, Lillian Browse, a respected art dealer and author of a Nicholson catalogue raisonné. However, the painting was not included in the more recent catalogue raisonné compiled by expert Patricia Reed. The team collect new scientific and documentary evidence, including earlier provenance to a wealthy London collector, handwriting analysis, infrared imaging to show the board had originally borne a painting of freesias (listed in the catalogue raisonné as missing), and a comparison of the pigments in the paint with traces left in an original painting box now owned by Nicholson's grandson. Nevertheless, Reed does not change her opinion and states that there is insufficient evidence to show that the painting was definitely by Nicholson, and not someone working alongside him.
24	2	"Toulouse-Lautrec"	Rachel Jardine	19 August 2018	4.04
In 1965, Alain, a French teenage boy got two sketchbooks from his grandmother containing contain images of horses, soldiers, women, dogs and more. While he never learned where she got them from, they were thought to be the work of an adolescent Henri de Toulouse-Lautrec. 50 years later, the Toulouse-Lautrec Expert Committee did not accept them as authentic, instead claiming most were by René Princeteau, Toulouse-Lautrec's art teacher. The team travel to Albi in southern France, where Toulouse-Lautrec was born, and visit his ancestral home, Château du Bosc, where he spent much of his youth. The authenticating committee meets before all the evidence, including analyses of handwriting and the technical details of the sketchbooks, can be submitted, and does not provide a clear decision either way, only offering to re-examine the sketches at a later date.
25	3	"Henry Moore"	Lucy Swingler	26 August 2018	4.22
The team investigate whether a small watercolour sketch is by British 20th-century sculptor Henry Moore. The sketch is thought to be the only piece by a British artist in a secret collection of around 1,500 works discovered in Germany in 2012. Known as the Gurlitt Hoard, the collection is suspected to contain many works of art stolen by the Nazis, and the team is asked by the Museum of Fine Art in Bern, Switzerland, to find out whether the sketch is looted art. Philip meets Moore's only child, Mary, who says she can see her father's hand in the sketch. Forensic tests on the ink used in the sketch are inconclusive, but infrared analysis reveals more figures on the back of the paper. Fiona discovers that in the early 1930s, Hildebrand Gurlitt, the man who amassed the hoard, worked as a museum curator and exhibited works by Moore who, at the time, was less appreciated at home in Britain. Furthermore, Gurlitt later became one of only four art dealers commissioned by the Nazis to sell works on the international market that were branded as degenerate art, and he purchased some for himself. When the team find an accurate description of the sketch in documentary archives, they are able to link one of Gurlitt's purchases to what was exhibited years before, thus establishing an unbroken provenance. Based on the team's research, the Henry Moore Foundation accepts the sketch as a genuine work by Moore.
26	4	"A Double Whodunnit"	Francis Welch	2 September 2018	4.35
Two rare portraits of black British subjects from the 18th and 19th centuries are investigated. The paintings are highly unusual in their positive depiction of black sitters at a time when Britain was still heavily engaged in the slave trade. The first painting is a double portrait depicting Dido Belle, a former slave who was brought up as a member of the aristocratic Murray family (Earls of Mansfield), and her cousin Lady Elizabeth Murray. The picture is on display at the Murray family's Scone Palace in Scotland and was commissioned by the 1st Earl of Mansfield, Dido Belle's guardian, sometime in the late 1770s or early 1780s. Lord Mansfield, a judge and abolitionist, had ruled in the infamous case of the Zong massacre. The picture's earlier attribution to Johan Zoffany had been brought into question, but the identity of the actual artist was not known. The second painting, even more unusual, is of two beautifully-dressed black girls with an open book in what appears to be a tropical landscape. Early clues suggest this could be a political painting, perhaps connected to the campaign to abolish slavery in British colonies. The signature and date are only partially legible. After an extensive investigation, forensic and other evidence reveals that the first painting is by David Martin, while the second painting is by Emma Soyer. (Note: Both portraits are revisited in the Series 13, episode 5 programme What Happened Next? A Double Whodunnit.)
27	5	"Giacometti"	Robert Murphy	9 September 2018	3.99
Answering the programme's call for works of art other than paintings, Philip and Fiona investigate a plaster sculpture that appears to be of Tête qui regarde (French for 'Gazing Head'), an early work by Alberto Giacometti. The object shows signs of extensive damage, and a CT scan reveals that it was repaired several times. The team try to discover how the sculpture was acquired by the current owner's family, and although some promising leads are followed, there is no clear trail of evidence linking the piece to Giacometti himself. However, the team learn that British artist Sidney John Woods was the original owner of a genuine 'Gazing Head' plaster. Since that piece's whereabouts are currently unknown, it is possible that the sculpture in this episode is the one that was initially owned by Woods. When the piece and the collected evidence are presented to the Giacometti Foundation in Paris, the first response is that further studies need to be made. This episode was originally scheduled to be broadcast as part of series 6, but it was delayed pending the Giacometti Foundation's provisional findings. Even though it was broadcast as part of this series (7), it would be rebroadcast at the end of series 8 as well, on 22 August 2019. In a short added sequence, Fiona told the audience that subsequent investigation had found a Giacometti signature on the sculpture. As a result, the Giacometti Foundation authenticated the piece, although not in time for the original 2018 screening. The update included that in February 2019, Gazing Head was auctioned at Christie's as an original work by Giacometti. It was sold for just over half a million pounds.

Note: Series 7 was broadcast at the same time that BARB changed their ratings system, the ratings have been sourced as follows: Episodes 1-3 are 28 day figures from BARB's old system. Episode 4 are 28 day figures from the new system. Episode 5 are 7 day figures from the old system.

Selected works featured in series 7

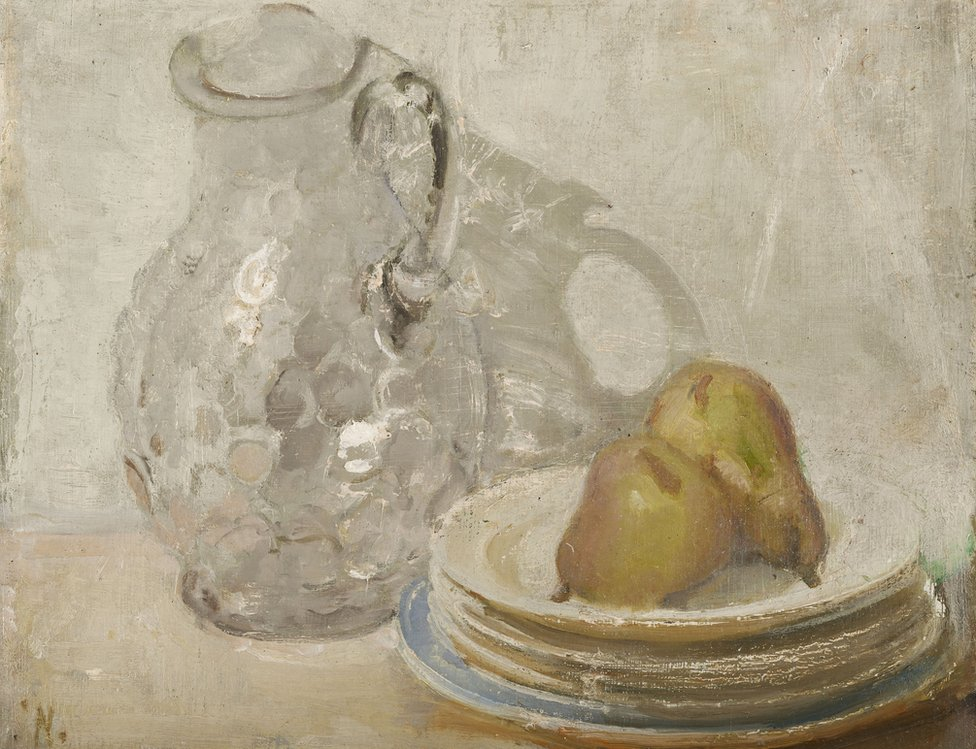
Still life with water jug and pears purportedly by William Nicholson

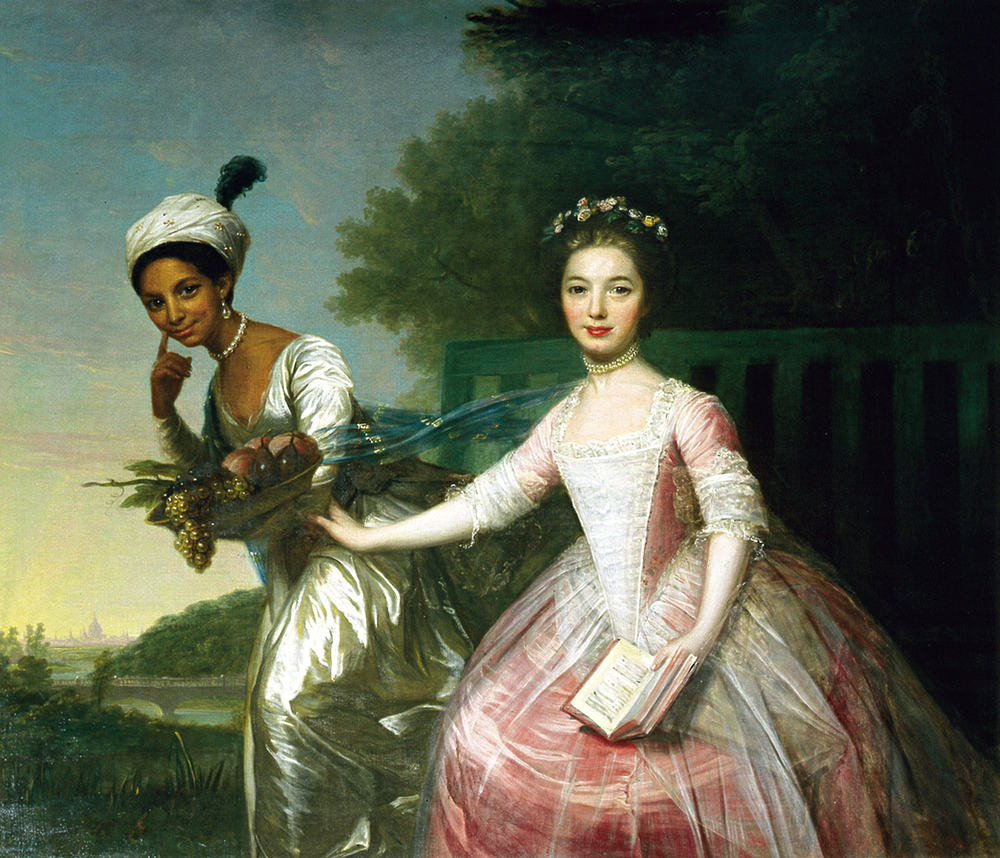
Dido Elizabeth Belle and Lady Elizabeth Murray by David Martin

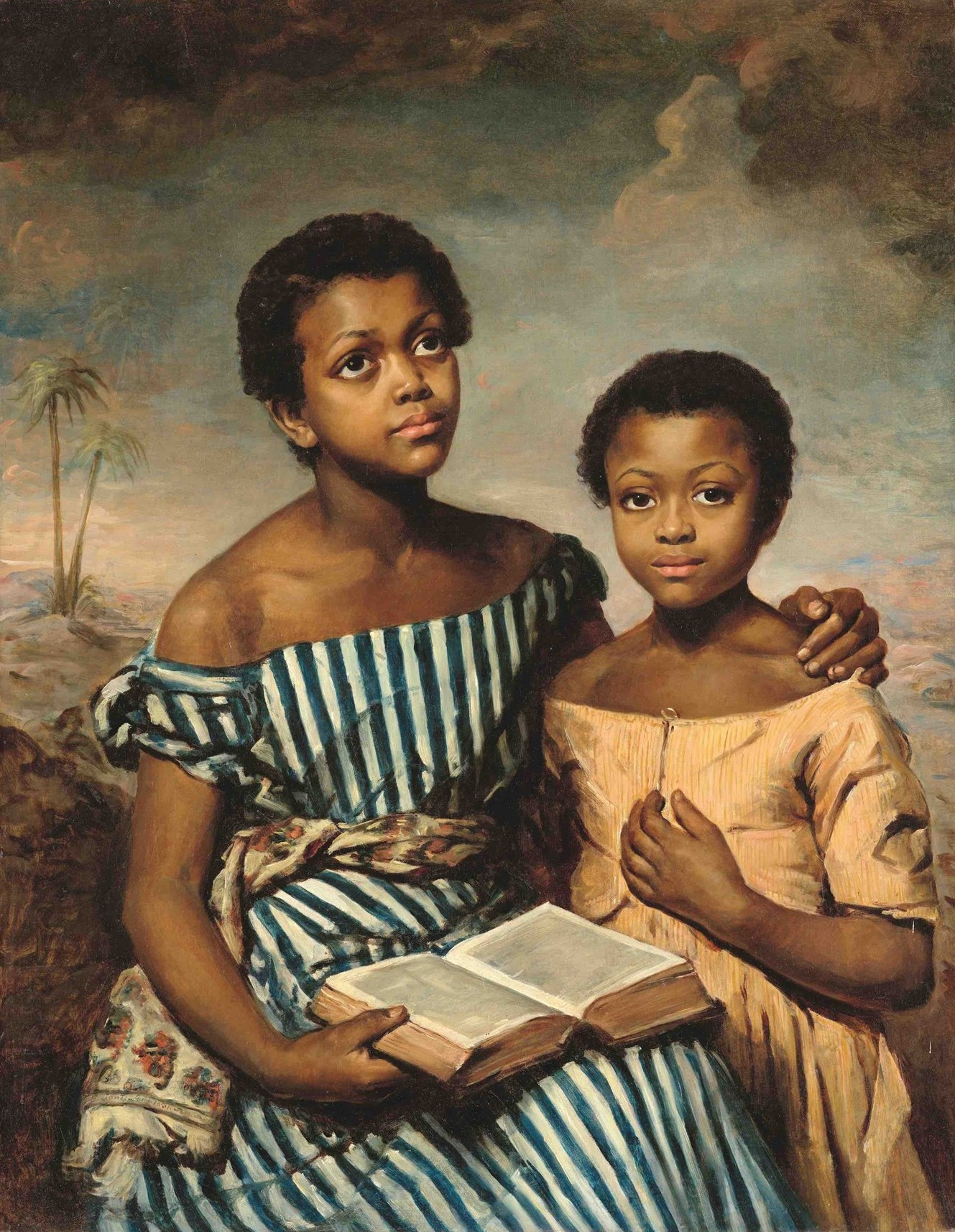
Two Girls with a Book by Emma Soyer

=== Series 8 (2019) ===
In addition to the four episodes of the series, the episode "Giacometti" from series 7 was rebroadcast on 22 August 2019. This was to add information that wasn't available when the episode was first broadcast, even though that broadcast was itself delayed from series 6.

No. overall	No. in series	Title	Directed by	Producer	Original release date	UK viewers (millions)
28	1	"The Lost Gainsborough"	Nicky Illis	Nicky Illis	25 July 2019	N/A (<3.94) (Note: Not reported in the weekly top 15 programmes for four-screen viewer ratings.)
An oil painting is examined by the team to see if it might be the original picture by Thomas Gainsborough of a print known as Wooded landscape with gipsies round a camp fire (also called The Gipsies). The painting roughly matches the print (once reversed), but it is not an exact mirror image. The picture has been in the owner's family since the 1920s, when it was attributed to Gainsborough. It had subsequently been down-graded to Barker of Bath and later even further, to a follower of Barker. Twenty years ago, Philip helped attribute a different painting as the lost landscape, which subsequently sold at auction as an authentic Gainsborough. If the team succeed here, it would undo the attribution of that other picture, whose current whereabouts are unknown. The provenance attached to the original Gainsborough painting holds that it was owned by Henry Graves during the 1880s, when it was exhibited and then sold at auction as a work by Gainsborough. The team find a label on the back of the frame with the name Henry Graves, and a stamped number on the frame corresponds with Christie's records about the Graves-owned painting that was sold as a Gainsborough. Infrared and x-ray imaging reveal that the landscape was painted on top of a much earlier portrait of a lady. It is suggested that Gainsborough, who was in financial difficulties at that time, had re-used the canvas of a different artist instead of buying a new one. While this practice was previously unknown for Gainsborough, a recent discovery found that he had indeed re-used an old canvas for a work confirmed as his. Microscopic analysis of the paint used does not find any modern pigments that would have revealed the picture to be a modern forgery, but it does not rule out other artists from earlier periods. The painting and all of the research are presented for review by Gainsborough expert Hugh Belsey, who concludes that the work is by Barker of Bath, not Gainsborough. In an ironic twist, the team find that the portrait hidden underneath the landscape was probably by Michael Dahl (1659–1743), and it might have been worth more today than the painting by Barker.
29	2	"Cosway or Lawrence?"	Lucy Swingler	Lucy Swingler	1 August 2019	N/A (<3.56)
The team investigate a portrait of Peniston Lamb II that is owned by the Cecil family, distant relatives of the sitter. Philip had chanced upon the work at the family's home in London, and he immediately suspected it was by Thomas Lawrence. Its owners, however, had always believed it was by Maria Cosway. The painting was shown in an exhibition of Cosway's works in 1895, and it was attributed to her the following year in the book Portraits at Panshanger by Victorian art historian Mary Boyle. The team travel to Chatsworth House to see a portrait by Cosway of Georgiana Cavendish, Duchess of Devonshire, her leading patron. Old labels on the back of the painting of Lamb suggest it had once been owned by Viscountess Jocelyn and by the 5th Earl of Arran. After some research, which reveals that the family inheritance passed through the female line for three generations in a row (making research that much more difficult), Fiona unearths a family letter with relevant information. Written by Lamb's sister, Emily, it attributed at least one portrait of him to Lawrence, from when the work hung at Melbourne Hall. Meanwhile, Philip oversees the technical analysis. The physical condition of the picture is excellent, and Lawrence is known for working in a way that preserves his paintings. In sharp contrast, the paint of surviving Cosway works is badly cracked. Technical analysis further suggests similarities in brush technique to other portraits by Lawrence. With all these indicators pointing to Lawrence, and at least a tenuous paper trail linking the family to Lawrence, the team decide to submit the work to the established Lawrence authorities, Professor Brian Allen and Dr Peter Funnell. On stylistic grounds, the painting is accepted as being by Lawrence, raising its value from perhaps £8,000 to over half a million pounds, in Philip's estimation.
30	3	"De Chirico"	Guy Arthur	Christopher Boreham	8 August 2019	N/A (<3.84)
Fiona and Philip visit an art dealer in the Cotswolds, who had bought an unusual still life in 1993 for £1. A friend of his suggested that it might be by Italian artist Giorgio de Chirico, and the painting was submitted in 1997 to the de Chirico foundation in Rome, but it was rejected. Nevertheless, the team is persuaded to take another look at the work, and its muted colours suggest it was not painted using traditional oil paint. A walnut in the foreground was one reason why the foundation had rejected the work, but Fiona meets with an expert based in Rome, who considers its presence to be indicative of de Chirico. She also unearths the original tempera recipes known to be used by the artist. Back in London, Philip uses technical analysis to confirm the presence of linseed oil and honey in the paint, which is highly specific to de Chirico. Meanwhile, Fiona explains to the owner that the team researched every local lead in the hopes of establishing a provenance trail back from the junk shop where the picture was purchased. However, the only potential link they found was a British singer who was a friend of de Chirico in the late 1940s and early 1950s. As a first for the programme, radiocarbon analysis (using carbon-14 dating, which takes advantage of the sharp increase in radiocarbon from atmospheric nuclear testing starting in the 1950s) is used to establish that the work was painted on a wooden panel from a tree felled before the 1950s, thus not disproving the possibility that the painting was given by de Chirico to the singer and later sold by her in Britain. While this theory could explain how the picture got from Italy to England, there is no evidence to prove it. After exhausting all avenues of research, the team resubmit the painting with their findings to the de Chirico foundation. However, the work is not authenticated, with the foundation instead suggesting that it is an imitation carried out as an exercise. This prompts Philip to speculate that it must have been painted by someone close to de Chirico.
31	4	"A Venetian View"	Rachel Jardine	Rachel Jardine	15 August 2019	N/A (<3.70)
Nick Hopkinson, publisher of International Boat Industry magazine, asks the team to examine a veduta painting of Venice that he was told his great-grandparents had bought on a trip to Italy in the 1880s. The picture was exhibited at the Royal Academy in 1908 and has two labels attached to the frame – one attributing it to Jacopo Marieschi and the other attributing it to Francesco Guardi. It is now known that Jacopo Marieschi did not paint any Venetian views, but a different artist with the same surname (Michele Marieschi) was famous for such pictures. At the Royal Academy, the team learn that the Guardi label was not official, but rather something that owners filled in when submitting works. Thus, the label merely indicates that the owner, Nick's great-grandfather Meyer Spielmann (brother of Sir Isidore Spielmann), believed or wanted to believe the painting was by Guardi. The second label corresponds to the catalogue entry, which suggests the Academy considered the picture to be by Marieschi. Fiona then finds an auction catalogue entry indicating that the work was sold in 1907 by Christie's in London, which is confirmed by a matching stock number stamped on the frame. In this auction, Meyer Spielmann purchased the painting as a Marieschi from the estate of Major Gubbins, thus Spielmann did not buy it in Italy during the 1880s. Nick becomes uncomfortable thinking about how his great-grandfather subsequently submitted it to the Royal Academy as a Guardi. Another clue is a red seal on the stretcher, which the team decipher as mentioning Firenze (Italian for 'Florence'). When they travel to Italy, they find that this seal relates to a specific magistrate's court in Florence before 1808, when the city was annexed to Napoleonic France. Technical analysis shows that the paints used were all available in the 18th century, but the treatment of the picture's ground layer is not consistent with Venetian practice, and the weave of the canvas suggests it originated in England. The painting is examined by Charles Beddington, Britain's foremost authority on Marieschi, who gives the opinion that it is by neither Guardi nor Marieschi, but by an English artist, with the seal added at some point to give it a spurious provenance. Philip reviews the difference in valuation – while a work by Marieschi could sell for half a million pounds and a genuine Guardi for up to £10 million, he puts an estimated value of £20,000 on Nick's painting.

Selected works featured in series 8

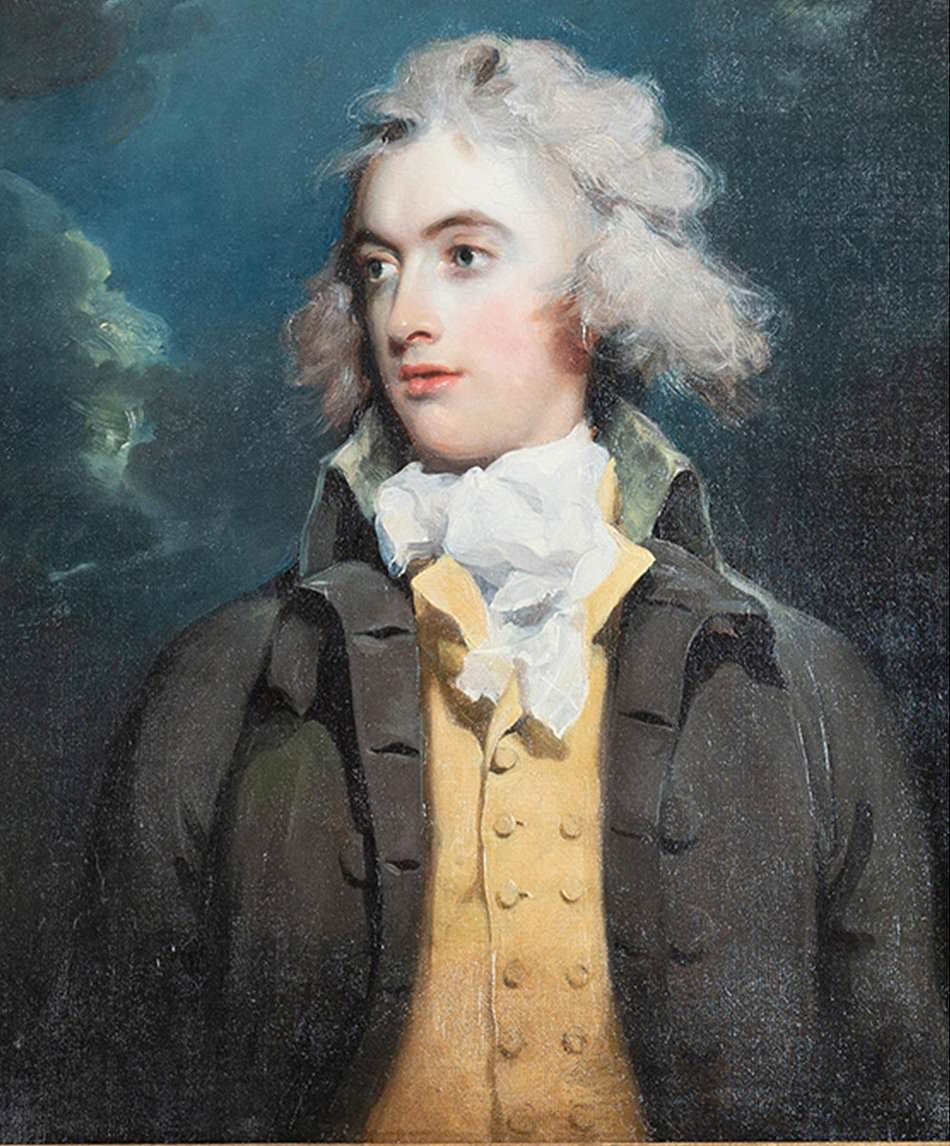
Peniston Lamb II by Thomas Lawrence

=== Series 9 (2021) ===
The Coronavirus pandemic disrupted the production schedule, but in September 2020, Philip Mould announced that pre-production of the ninth series had started.

No. overall	No. in series	Title	Produced and directed by	Original release date	UK viewers (millions)
32	1	"A Sculpture in the Brambles"	Nicky Illis	28 July 2021	N/A (<3.41)
The team members travel to Mergate Hall, at Mulbarton near Norwich in Norfolk, to look at a sculpture belonging to retired dairy farmer Neil Betts and his wife, Barbara. The item had been used as a doorstop and a garden water feature, but the owners now suspect that it may have been created by Henry Moore. The review panel of the Henry Moore Foundation, in Perry Green, Hertfordshire, determine that the sculpture is not by Moore, partly because it is made of aluminium, a material not used by Moore. The work is found to be by the late Betty Jewson (1914–1981), a British artist who once lived at Mergate Hall. As a result, it is worth just a few thousand pounds, rather than up to £1 million.
33	2	"Gerome"	Guy Arthur	4 August 2021	N/A (<3.47)
An Orientalist painting known as Arab at Prayer is investigated by the team. It is dated 1858 and has the signature of Jean-Léon Gérôme, a French artist who was very prominent during the 19th century. However, the work was downgraded to 'Circle of Gérôme' in the 1980s by a leading authority, Gerald M. Ackerman. Following Ackerman's death in 2016, the painting's owner approached the programme to look into the possibility of re-attribution. After extensive research and technical analysis, the evidence is presented to a new expert, Emily M. Weeks, who finds that the picture was painted by Gérôme. In October 2021, the painting sold for £94,500 (including fees) at a Sotheby's auction in London.
34	3	"Landseer"	Nicky Illis	11 August 2021	N/A (<3.48)
An oil painting of a battle scene is examined to see whether it could be Sir Edwin Landseer's Time of War from 1846, a lost work that the Tate Gallery recorded as being "damaged beyond repair" following the 1928 Thames flood. However, several other pictures so recorded were discovered later and subsequently restored, including The Execution of Lady Jane Grey by Paul Delaroche and The Destruction of Pompeii and Herculaneum by John Martin. Although the team's findings are very encouraging, a leading Landseer authority (Richard Louis Ormond) ultimately determines that this painting is a copy, but of better quality than usual for a reproduction.
35	4	"A King's Last Supper"	Claire Lewis	18 August 2021	2.90
A sheep farmer in Anglesey, Huw Lewis, had bought a small painting depicting the Last Supper for £50 in an online auction on eBay. He believes that it might be by British American-born artist Benjamin West, who was the official history painter of King George III. The picture is investigated to see whether it is a preparatory sketch by West for The Last Supper, a monumental work from 1786 that was originally commissioned by George III for St George's Chapel at Windsor Castle and is now in the Detroit Institute of Arts. While examining the painting at The Courtauld Institute of Art, Professor Aviva Burnstock finds traces of an expensive Indian yellow pigment that West used. Additional evidence suggests that the work bought by Lewis is the missing one of two preparatory sketches that West made for The Last Supper. As a result, Lewis agrees to have his picture cleaned and restored by Rupert Featherstone at the Hamilton Kerr Institute in Cambridge, which helps reveal the work's finer details. After studying the painting and the team's evidence, art expert Martin Postle of the Paul Mellon Centre for Studies in British Art confirms an attribution to West.

Selected works featured in series 9

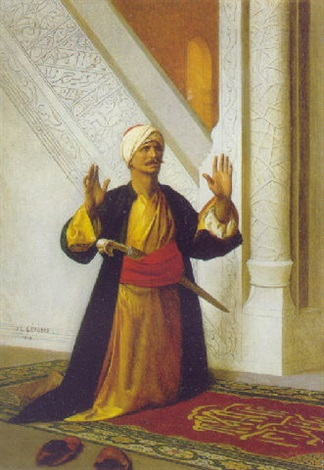
At Prayer (1858) by Jean-Léon Gérôme

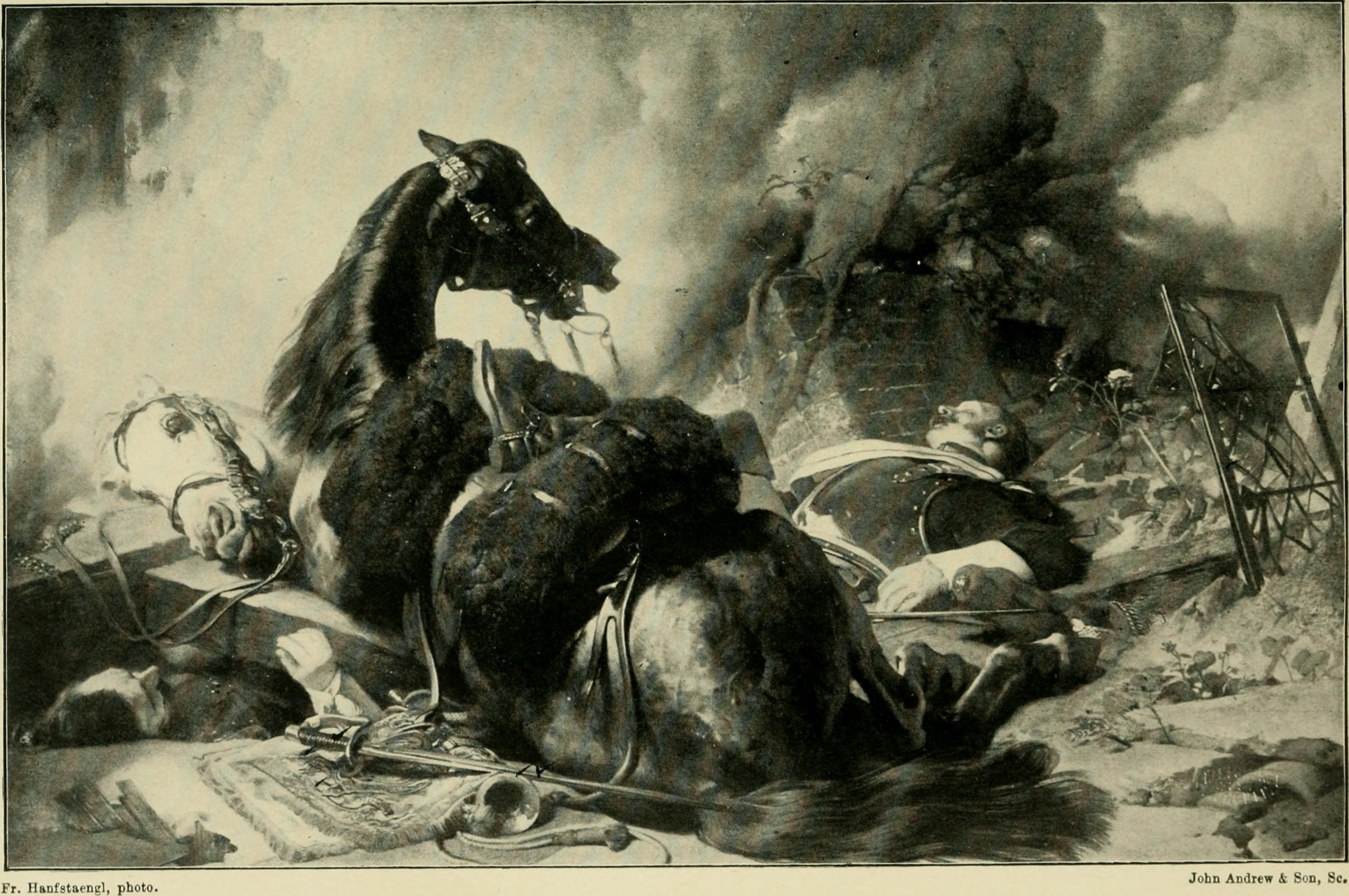
Time of War (1846) by Sir Edwin Landseer (this image is a print published in 1901)

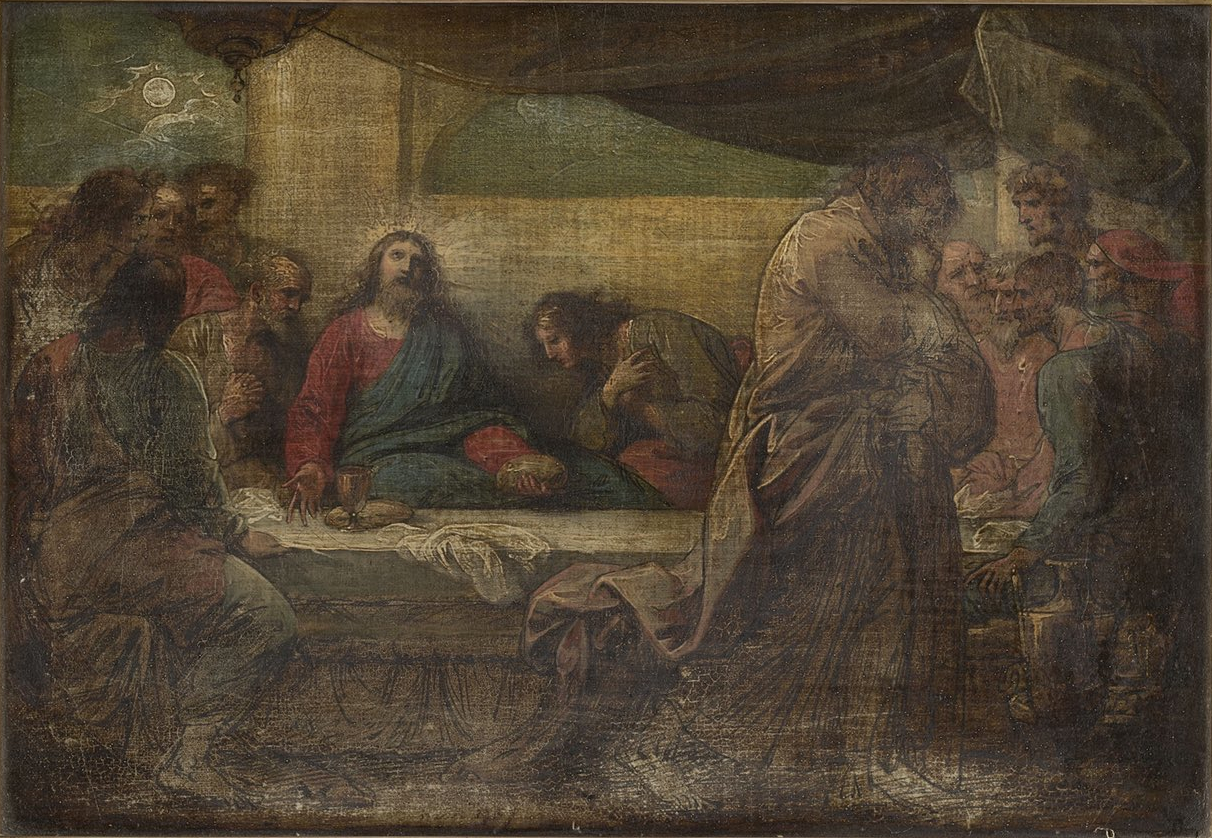
Second preparatory sketch for The Last Supper (1786) by Benjamin West (before restoration)

=== Series 10 (2022) ===
No. overall	No. in series	Title	Produced and directed by	Original release date	UK viewers (millions)
36	1	"Ben Nicholson"	Nicky Illis	23 August 2022	2.76
Fiona Bruce and Philip Mould attempt to uncover the history of an abstract work that was painted directly onto the plaster wall inside a house. It was once the home of amateur sculptor Fred Murray, brother of noted British ceramicist William Staite Murray. The current owners were told by a neighbour that the work was painted by Ben Nicholson, and if this can be proven, the painting could be worth up to £200,000. The owners want to determine the authenticity of the work before they continue building an extension that could damage the painting. Although it is soon established that Fred Murray was an early patron of Nicholson, the painting contains some puzzling elements, and it is not known whether Nicholson ever visited the property. Evidence is subsequently found which proves that Nicholson did stay there, and the investigation explains, at least in part, the presence of the atypical stylistic features. However, Mould is concerned that these could indicate a collaboration between Nicholson and Murray, which is what the experts conclude after they assess the evidence. As a result, Mould revises his estimate of the painting's value to be between £50,000 and £100,000. Although professional removal of the painting would be costly and not without risk, the owners decide to go ahead with this, and the work is removed safely and sent for restoration before going to auction.
37	2	"Modigliani"	Christopher Boreham	30 August 2022	2.72
The team investigate a delicate sketch depicting a mother and child, believed to be by Modigliani, who has been the victim of many forgeries. Its owner, Henrietta Sitwell, inherited the work from her grandfather Sacheverell Sitwell. A forensic examination of the drawing shows the paper is not modern and it compares well with sketches in a sketchbook of Modigliani at the Pompidou Centre in Paris, being exactly the same size and with the same number of perforations on the left-hand side. Handwriting expert Adam Brand confirms that the signature on the drawing is "probably" that of Modigliani. The picture's dedication, to Modigliani's friend and art dealer Léopold Zborowski, strongly suggests a connection with the artist. The drawing is likely traced to a 1919 exhibition of modern French artists, organised by Sacheverell, his brother and Zborowski, held at Heal's department store in London. Presented with all the evidence, Modigliani expert Kenneth Wayne decides that the drawing "smells like" it is by the artist. As a result, Mould give the drawing's value of up to £100,000.
38	3	"Sisley"	Guy Arthur	6 September 2022	N/A
Bruce and Mould investigate a landscape of a river scene in Moret-sur-Loing, possibly by British artist Alfred Sisley, owned by Americans Kim and Chuck, who had bought the painting at auction near Chicago. Impressionist scholar Anthea Callen, of The Courtauld Institute of Art, is impressed by its similarity to known works by the artist. However, the Comité Alfred Sisley do not believe it is by Sisley. The value as a Sisley was estimated by Philip Mould as £ 250,000 quite possibly more. As an "in the style of Sisley" it is only worth a few hundred pounds, maybe low thousands at best.
39	4	"Flemish Old Master"	Matthew Smith	13 September 2022	N/A
The team examine a painting depicting the Lamentation of Christ hanging in a Catholic church in Port Glasgow. A late parishioner contacted the show, believing that it was the work of a Flemish master of the Northern Renaissance. Using his list of possible candidates, the team narrow their search down to Michiel Coxie and Frans Floris. Dendrochronology rules out Floris. After consulting with experts, Mould is convinced that the painting bears Coxie's unique blend of Flemish and Italian elements. A leading expert eventually rules out Michiel as the artist, but he suggests that the artist was an associate of Coxie, naming his son Raphael Coxie as the likeliest candidate.

Selected works featured in series 10

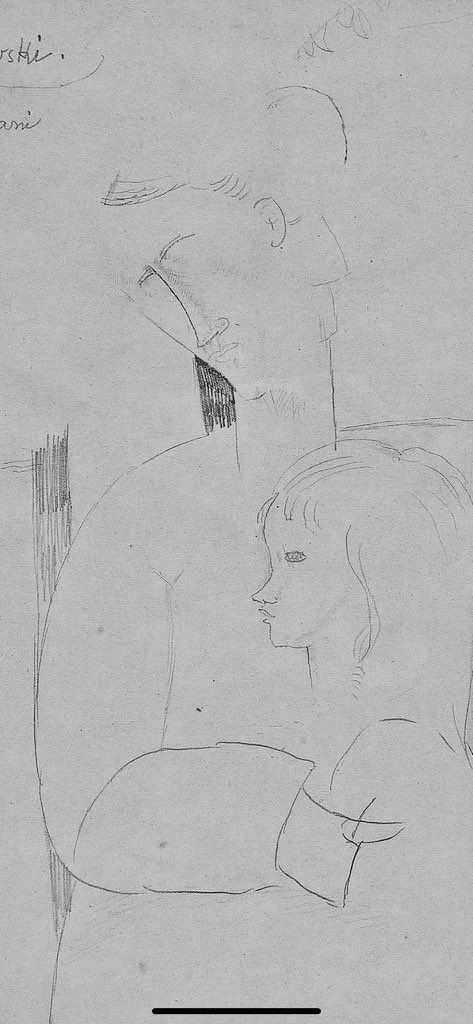
Mother and Child by Amedeo Modigliani

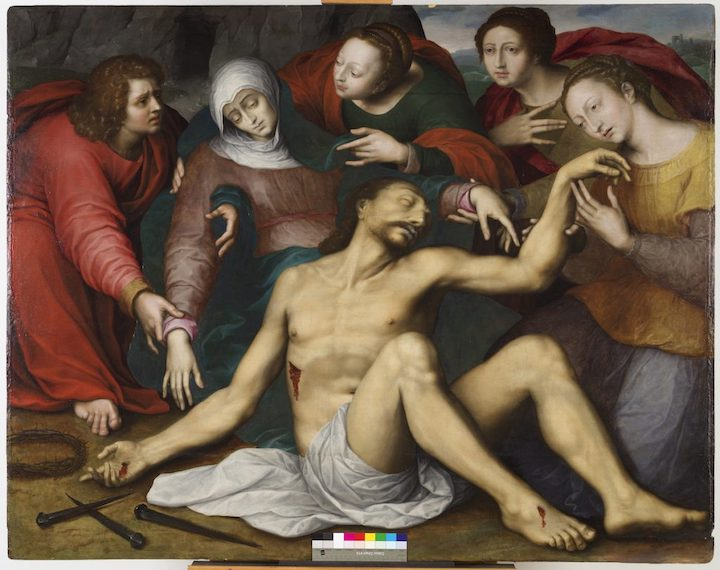
The Deposition of Christ from the Cross, attributed to Raphael Coxie

=== Series 11 (2023) ===
No. overall	No. in series	Title	Produced and directed by	Original release date	UK viewers (millions)
40	1	"Elisabeth Frink"	Matthew Thomas	26 September 2023	N/A
In this episode, the team embarks on one of its most intricate and captivating investigations to date: the mystery surrounding a sculpture believed to be by celebrated British artist Dame Elisabeth Frink. Entitled Small Warrior and dated 1956, the bronze was discovered at a car boot sale in Essex and acquired for a mere £90 by Amanda Kirke. Struck by the sculpture’s distinctive form and apparent craftsmanship, Kirke began delving into its provenance. Her research revealed that Frink had created an edition of ten bronzes under the same title in 1956—one of which was once owned by David Bowie, another by Nuffield College, Oxford. Sensing a possible connection, Kirke approached the Beaux Arts Gallery, long associated with Frink’s work. However, in the absence of concrete provenance, the gallery declined to authenticate the piece, leaving her in a state of uncertainty. The team took up the challenge. Their investigation led them to Pangolin Editions, one of the country’s foremost sculpture foundries, where the piece underwent detailed metallurgical analysis. The results, subsequently reviewed at Begbroke Science Park in Oxford, confirmed that the bronze composition matched that of known casts from the Small Warrior series. Crucially, it showed no evidence of being a later reproduction and may even have been cast from the same original bronze ingot. Further examination at Pangolin revealed traces of clay at the sculpture’s base—strong evidence of an original mid-century casting process. Armed with both scientific evidence and historical context, the team presented their findings to the Elisabeth Frink Estate’s authentication panel. Following a thorough review, the panel issued its verdict: the sculpture was indeed an original work by Dame Elisabeth Frink—elevating its value to an estimated £60,000.
41	2	"Joshua Reynolds"	Rachel Jardine	3 October 2023	N/A
In this episode, the team investigates a painting sold online. It was purchased as "in the manner of" Joshua Reynolds for £2,700. Since it is determined that a lot of overpaint has been added, it is decided that the painting needs to be cleaned and the newer layers removed. Dr. Martin Postle, the foremost expert on Sir Joshua Reynolds and author of the most recent catalogue raisonne, determined the picture is at best maybe 5% Reynolds. He believes someone has produced a pastiche of a Reynolds subject picture. An homage of sorts. It is attributed to circle of Joshua Reynolds.
42	3	"Camille Pissarro & Paul Cézanne"	Julia Foot	10 October 2023	N/A
In this episode, the team investigates two mysterious drawings believed to be by French Impressionist masters Camille Pissarro and Paul Cézanne. The first, Paysans au Marché, is a pastel and charcoal work owned by Suzana Glaser believed to be by Camille Pissarro. Previously rejected by Bonhams in 2012, the drawing was thought to lack conclusive evidence of authenticity. However, new forensic and stylistic analysis revealed that both the charcoal outlines and pastel colouring were executed simultaneously by the same hand—strongly indicating that Pissarro alone was responsible for the work. This led to a breakthrough when the Pissarro Committee in France formally authenticated the piece and included it in the official catalogue raisonné of the artist's drawings and gouaches. The second case centres on a delicate watercolour of a tree, believed to be by Paul Cézanne and owned by Dominique Rogers. She inherited the piece through her family, tracing its origins to her great-uncle, the poet Antony Valabrègue, a close friend of Cézanne. Despite her personal indifference to Cézanne’s artistic style, Dominique is convinced of its provenance as a direct gift from the artist. Scientific tests confirmed the pigments and paper date from the correct period, but the Cézanne Committee in Zurich withheld authentication. They noted that the work originated from a sketchbook unrecognised among Cézanne’s known sketchbooks and closely resembled an established Cézanne drawing held by the Saint Louis Art Museum—suggesting it may be an early copy rather than an original.
43	4	"Arshile Gorky"	Matthew Smith	17 October 2023	N/A
This time it is professor Aviva Burnstock who suggests the team come take a look at a painting that has confounded the art world for over half a century whose potential value means it is kept at a secret location outside London - signed Gorky, premiere American abstract painter of the 20th century. The canvas turns out to hold two paintings, one underneath the other, and both underneath a white-grey coat of paint that Philip characterises as a "dog's dinner". The team finds out Gorky reworked the composition over the years, before giving up and painting it over with the white-grey layer of paint. The first layer, a cubist composition, is authenticated to be a lost artwork of Gorky, now irretrievably destroyed, partly through botched attempts to remove the white-grey layer; while the second layer, related to his known work The Betrothal II, is deemed too damaged to be considered a work of Arshile Gorky.

Selected works featured in series 11

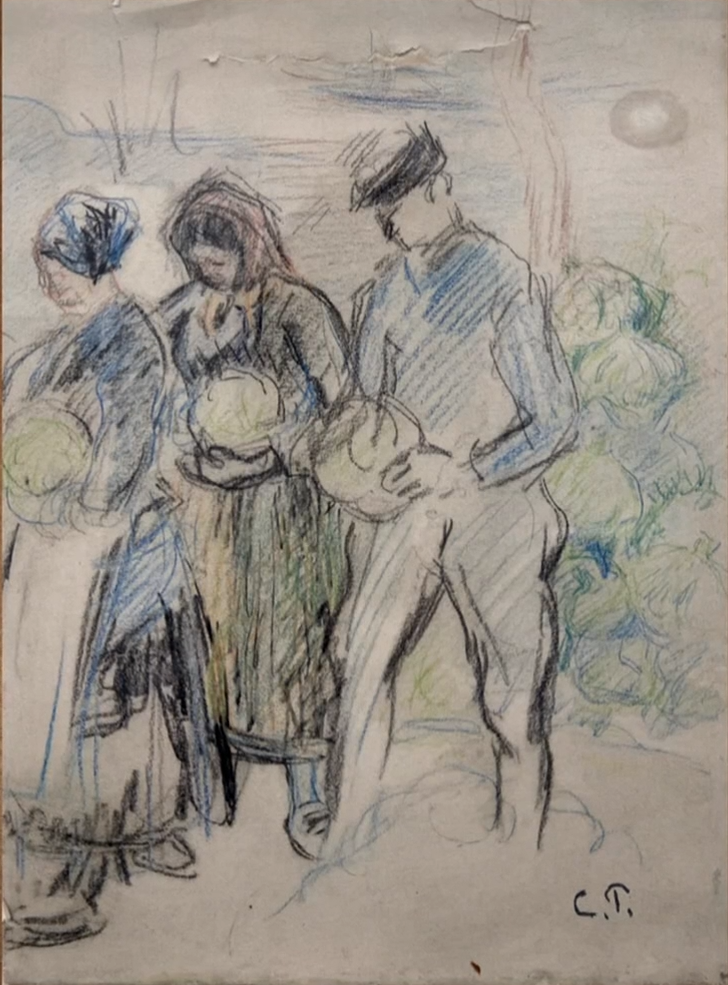
Paysans au Marché by Camille Pissarro

=== Series 12 (2024) ===
No. overall	No. in series	Title	Produced and directed by	Original release date	UK viewers (millions)
44	1	"Mondrian"	Guy Arthur & Nicky Illis	26 September 2024	N/A
The team help American artist Jeffrey Kroll build a case to prove that his flower picture is by Piet Mondrian, with an estimated value of £250,000. Despite once being sold at Bonhams, it is eventually shown to be an ingenious fake, and so worth about £200.
45	2	"Helen McNicoll"	Matthew Smith	3 October 2024	N/A
The team investigates a work by Canadian Impressionist Helen McNicoll. The work was titled Women of the Fields, which was purchased at a London auction for £2,090 by artist and small-time art dealer David Taylor. Initially lacking provenance and formal attribution, the team's research in Canada and the United Kingdom later revealed that the work is actually The Bean Harvest, a long-lost painting that McNicoll even exhibited at the Royal Academy in 1915, months before her death. As the investigation progressed, the team consulted leading McNicoll scholar Sandra Burton, who ultimately confirmed the work as an authentic McNicoll. The authentication attracted the interest of Canadian billionaire and noted art collector Pierre Lassonde, who owns one of the most significant private collections of McNicoll’s works and was likewise featured on the episode. The work was revisited in the Series 13, episode 6 programme What Happened Next? Helen McNicoll. The painting had been sold at Sotheby’s in November 2024 for £174,000, with Lassonde emerging as the buyer. It was subsequently included in the major retrospective Helen McNicoll: An Impressionist Journey, which was held at the Musée national des beaux-arts du Québec and later at the Art Gallery of Hamilton.
46	3	"Music Memorabilia"	Christopher Boreham	10 October 2024	N/A
A Hawaiian steel guitar that might have belonged to Ronnie Wood or Keith Richards; and a grand piano by John Broadwood & Sons, reputedly once at Tittenhurst Park, that might have belonged to John Lennon or Ringo Starr and now in the possession of Chesney Hawkes. None of these links is proven.
47	4	"Corot"	Sara Moralioglu	17 October 2024	N/A
The team investigates a picturesque landscape, The Head of the Lake, purchased by country antiques dealer Derek Green, largely because of the quality of its ornate frame. The large number of fake works produced, many in Corot's lifetime, give the team reason to be doubtful. It is revealed, from Green's papers, that the painting had been assessed and rejected three times by Pierre Dierterle, an accepted authority on Corot. One of three exhibition labels, on the back of the painting, shows that it was at one time owned by Scottish rail owner Sir John Reid (1861-1933), and then by his daughter Elizabeth Salvesen. Using ultra-violet light, conservator Aviva Burnstock discovers a stamp on the back of the canvas bearing the name "Jerome Ottoz", a leading canvas supplier to Corot and his contemporaries. The team examine a hand-made catalogue of fake works complied by art historian and friend of Corot, Alfred Robaut, and discover that the work is included, with notably disparaging remarks. The final decision, by Corot expert Clare Lebeau-Deterle, is that the painting, despite its quality, cannot be attributed to Corot.

Selected works featured in series 12

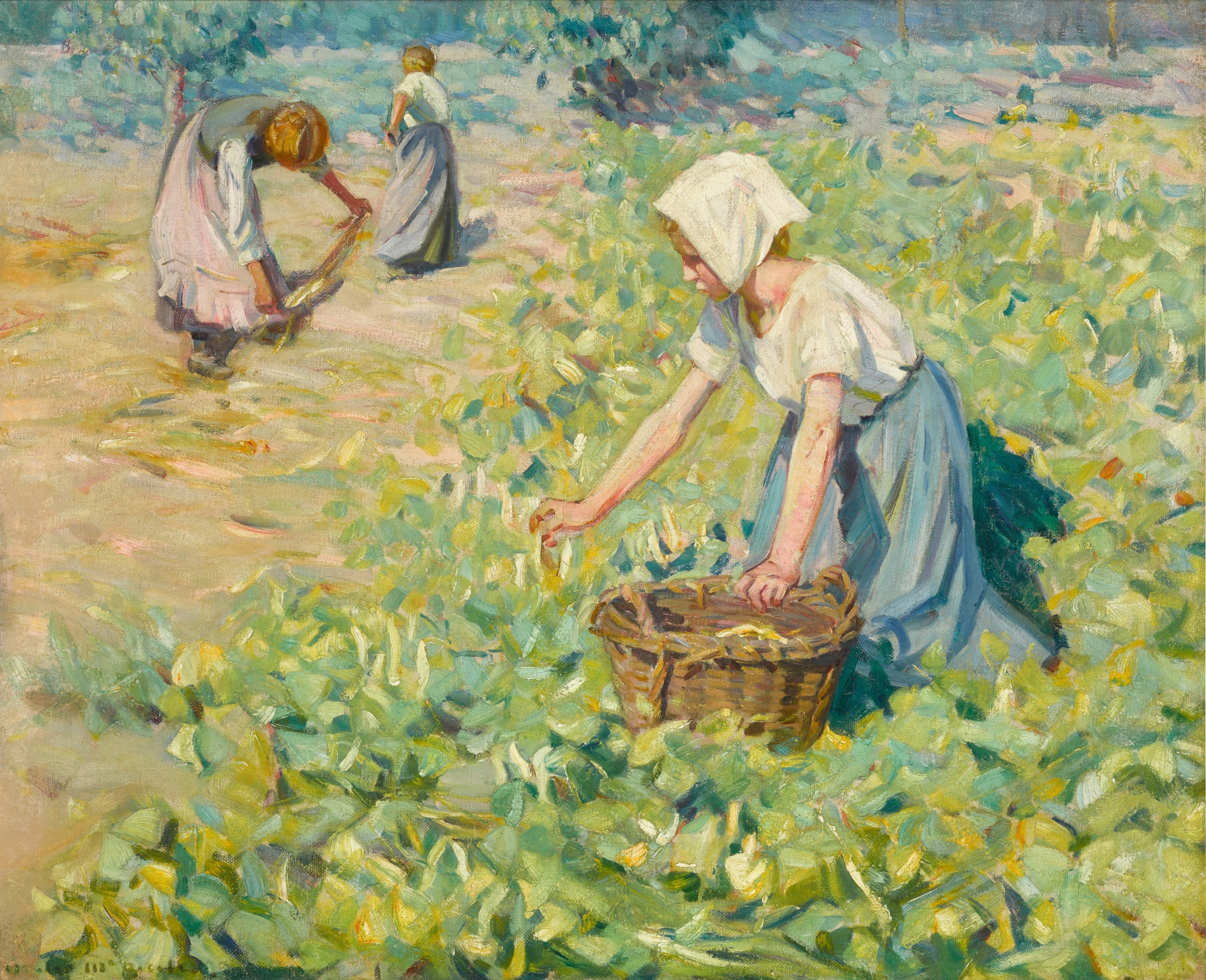
The Bean Harvest by Helen McNicoll

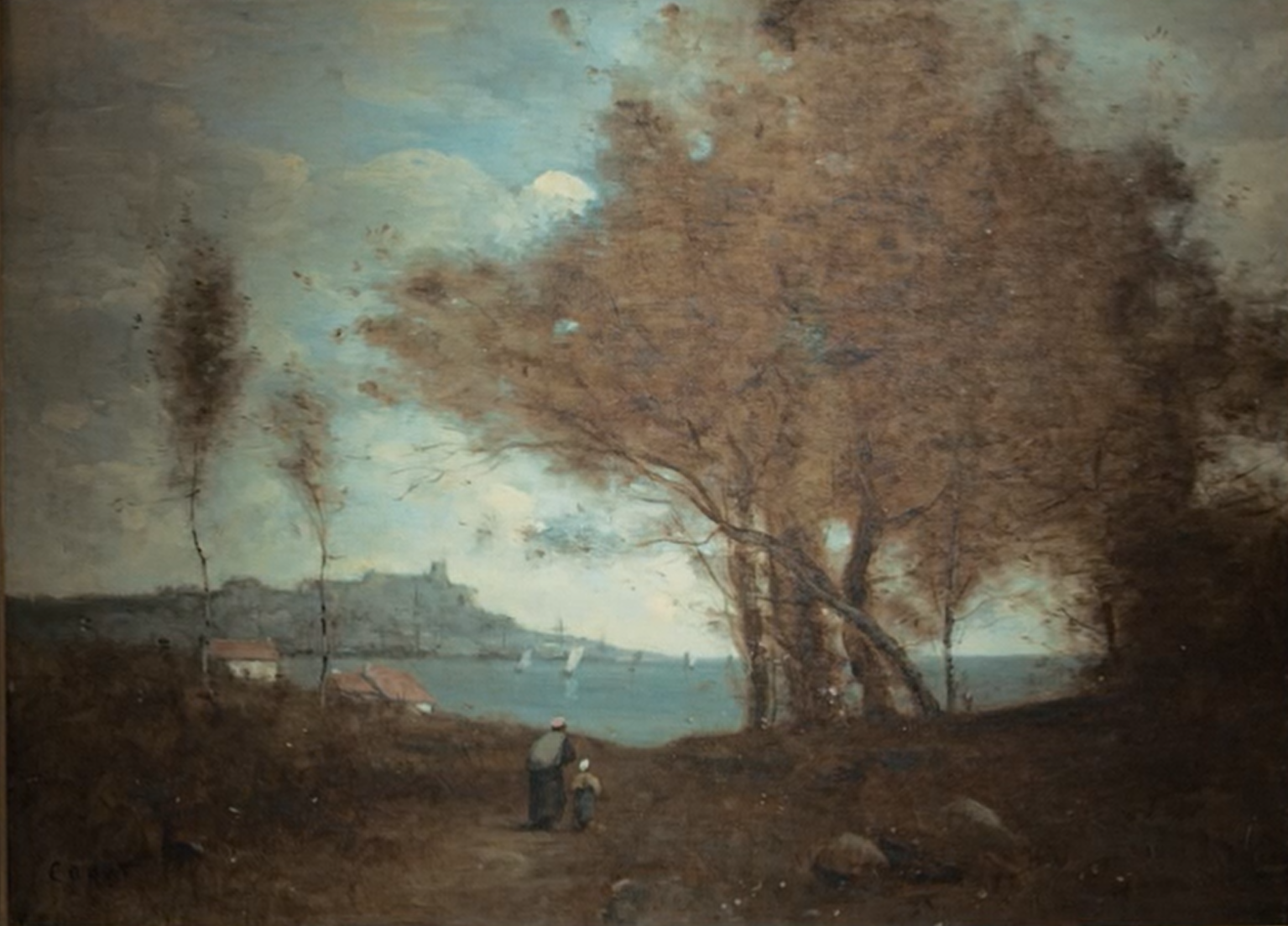
The Head of the Lake

=== Series 13 (2025) ===
No. overall	No. in series	Title	Produced and directed by	Original release date	UK viewers (millions)
48	1	"The Mystery of Churchill’s Garden"	Sebastian Barfield	21 July 2025	N/A
Antiques collector Barry James believes he has found a genuine Winston Churchill; a painting of roses at a garden staircase at Herstmonceux Castle that was considered lost. After a thorough investigation, where the team establishes that Churchill did indeed spend time at the castle at the time the painting is said to be painted, artist Paul Rafferty (who coincidentally found the photographic evidence proving the authenticity of another Churchill showcased in an earlier episode, "Munnings and Churchill" from #Series 4 (2015)), agrees the painting is genuine. Barry Phipps, leading member of the Paintings Group, an informal collective that helps manage issues regarding artwork by Sir Winston Churchill, agrees the painting could be by Churchill, but requires documentary evidence before agreeing to conclusively attribute it as a genuine Churchill.
49	2	"A Tale of Two Renoirs"	Guy Arthur	28 July 2025	N/A
Two possible Renoirs, with separate owners, are investigated. After the discovery of Titanium white in its ground layer, a pigment that was not used by Renoir, the landscape is shown to be a forgery made after Renoir's death, while a portrait of a young girl is not authenticated, but the possibility of future verification if provenance can be established is left open.
50	3	"A Modern Masterpiece for £35?"	Matthew Smith	4 August 2025	N/A
In this episode, the team investigates a painting owned by art blogger Robjn Cantus, bought in 2019 when Hertfordshire County Council sold part of its mid-20th-century art collection for only £35. Originally attributed to British artist Vera Cuningham, research revealed this was incorrect. With help from curators and conservators at Auckland Art Gallery Toi o Tāmaki, the team analysed the gouache work and found stylistic similarities to paintings by New Zealand modernist Frances Hodgkins. The piece, previously listed as anonymous and titled Garden Scene, was linked to a missing work called October Landscape, thought to depict a Roman goldmine in Wales and possibly sold by the Lefevre Gallery in 1943. New Zealand art historian Mary Kisler, the leading expert on Hodgkins, authenticated the piece—confirming it as a lost work by the artist. Mould estimates its value at up to £50,000.
51	4	"Portrait of a Lady - in Pittsburgh?"	Matthew Smith	11 August 2025	N/A
The team investigate a painting owned by an American couple, Laura and Pat, which they believe could be a work of Swiss painter Angelica Kauffmann. While engravings of the scene are prolific, the actual painting was considered lost. Depicting a female figure weeping over a monumental urn, with the inscription "(in memory of General Stanwick's daughter)" and including a poem painted directly on the canvas, the painting was purchased at a Pittsburgh estate sale for just US$200. Provenance research uncovered an intact chain of ownership, starting from poet Anne Hunter who was the model of the work and author of the poem. It remained in the Hunter Baillie family for decades. In 1917, an ageing great-niece sold the family's collection, including the painting—then known as Portrait of Mrs John Hunter—at auction. The painting went through Foster's Auction House, the London gallery Arthur Tooth & Sons before J.J. Gillespie Gallery in Pittsburgh sold it to American industrialist James B. Laughlin whose interest stemmed from the fact that General Stanwix oversaw the construction of Fort Pitt, eventually leading to the development of modern-day Pittsburgh, the city where Laughlin made his fortune. Technical analysis at the Hamilton Kerr Institute revealed that the painting had suffered from heavy overpainting, which both damaged the original work and diminished its value, though the surviving poem could still be linked to Kauffmann's hand. The team submitted their findings to two leading experts: Wendy Roworth of the University of Rhode Island, and Dr Bettina Baumgärtel, who is preparing the catalogue raisonné of Kauffmann’s works. While Roworth concluded the painting was indeed by Kauffmann, Baumgartel agreed to include it in the catalogue, but only as “attributed to” Kauffmann due to the extent of the damage. As a result, Philip Mould adjusted his estimated value of the painting from £60,000 to £20,000.
52	5	"What Happened Next? A Double Whodunnit"	Francis Welch & Guy Arthur	18 August 2025	N/A
A replay of the 2017 investigation (Series 7, episode 4) into two rare portraits of Black British women from the 18th and 19th centuries, Dido Elizabeth Belle and Lady Elizabeth Murray by David Martin and Two Girls with a Book, by Emma Jones. In the final part, Fiona Bruce and Philip Mould return in the present day to look at how both paintings have gained more attention — and much higher value — after the 2020 removal of the statue of Edward Colston, which brought renewed focus on Britain’s links to the transatlantic slave trade. They speak again with the current owners, Lady Mansfield and Charlie Macquaker, to trace what has happened to each work. David Martin’s portrait of Dido Elizabeth Belle and Lady Elizabeth Murray has since featured in several exhibitions on Black portraiture, while Emma Soyer’s Two Girls with a Book went on long-term loan to Tate in 2022, showing its growing cultural and historical importance.
53	6	"What Happened Next? Helen McNicoll"	Matthew Smith & Guy Arthur	25 August 2025	N/A
A replay of the 2024 investigation (series 12, episode 2) into The Bean Harvest by Canadian Impressionist Helen McNicoll. In the final part, it was reported a distant relative of the Pine-Coffin family had contacted the Fake or Fortune team to explain the missing link in the provenance: the painting was owned by their family before it was offered for sale at the Lincolnshire auction where it was purchased by the painting’s former owner, art dealer David Taylor. The 2024 programme had ended with Canadian billionaire Pierre Lassonde flying to London and making Taylor an offer. Philip Mould was now shown meeting Taylor when he was still pondering what to do, before he sold the work at Sotheby’s in November 2024 for £174,000. The buyer was revealed to be Lassonde. Fiona Bruce then interviewed Lassonde, who confirmed he had previously made Taylor an offer, and that this was for £300,000. Mould notes that although Taylor did not achieve the price he had hoped for, he still made a substantial profit from the sale. The work was included in the major retrospective Helen McNicoll: An Impressionist Journey, which was held at the Art Gallery of Hamilton in March of 2025.

Selected works featured in series 13

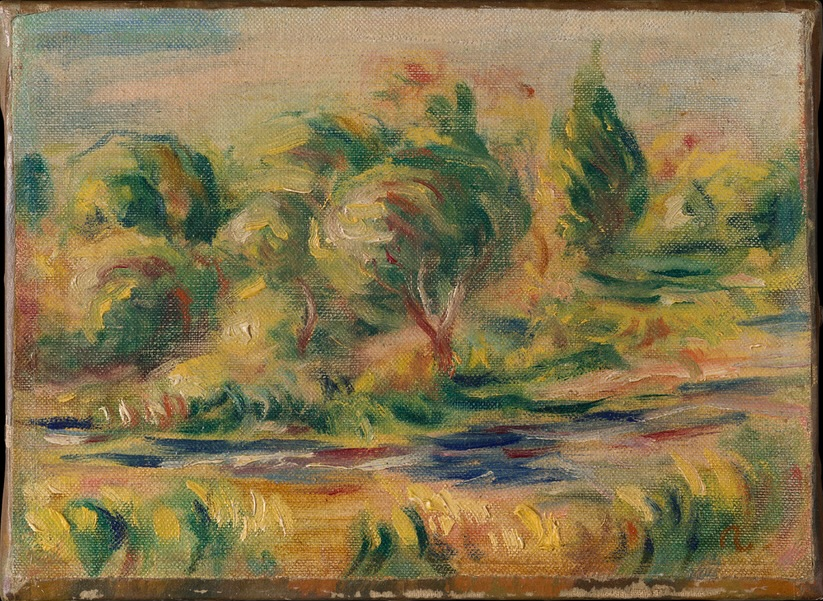
Not a Renoir

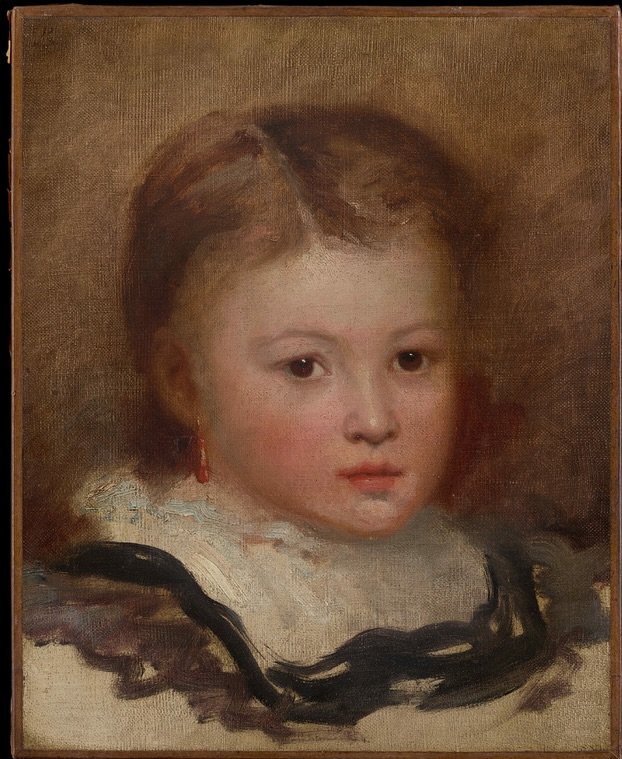
A possible Renoir portrait

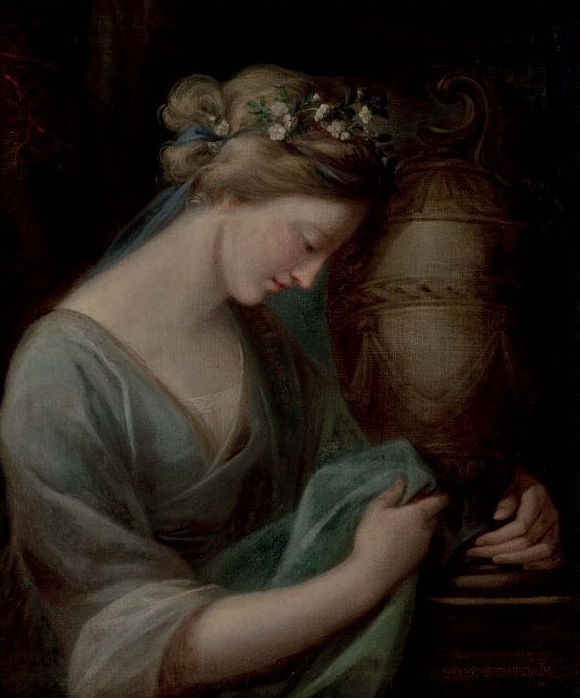
Female figure weeping over a monumental urn (Anne Hunter), 1766–1767, attributed to Angelica Kauffmann.

=== Series 14 (2026) ===
No. overall	No. in series	Title	Produced and directed by	Original release date	UK viewers (millions)
54	1	"Fabergé or Fauxbergé"	Christopher Boreham	16 July 2026	N/A
Sales assistant Rachel has inherited a purported Fabergé flower vase. Bonhams auction house had in 2014 estimated its value to at least £200,000, but later, for unclear reasons, reassessed the vase to be in the "style" of Fabergé, removing nearly all monetary value. Despite Fiona and Philip's best efforts, when submitted for a new assessment, Bonhams stood by their earlier conclusion.
55	2	"A Passage to India"	Philip Broadhurst	23 July 2026	N/A
Mary-Louise Wedderburn brings a painting of an Indian lady to Philip's gallery. She was told by relatives it is by her distant ancestor Scottish 18th century portrait painter Katherine Read. The team investigates the paintings provenance and attempts to find out the identity of the sitter. They discover that Read did visit Chennai (then Madras), and a local investigator finds other Read paintings of the local Indian aristocracy. Art historian Charles Greig establishes that the painting is indeed by Read, and probably is the first painting ever of an Indian made by a Western female artist. Philip estimates the strength of the Anglo-Indian art market will make it sell for £100,000 upwards.
56	3	"The Last Gift"	Philip Broadhurst	30 July 2026	N/A
Fiona and Philip investigates a painting purportedly by French Fauvist artist André Derain in his early years. The team is unable to overcome the painting's various issues and weaknesses, and the Comité André Derain declares the painting is not by Derain.
57	4	"Freud or Fraud?"	Christopher Boreham	6 August 2026	N/A
Brothers Mike and Anthony, having worked in their father's printing firm Mauroo in Barnsbury Park, Islington before it shuttered in the 1990s, present Fiona and Philip with no less than fifteen previously-unknown prints of Lucian Freud's etching Girl with Fig Leaf, known to have been made in the late 1940s in a series of ten. Philip estimates that if authentic unsigned prints, they can be sold for £10,000 to £30,000 each. These prints are neither numbered nor signed, and as it turns out, made using paper that dates no earlier than the 1950s. However, despite circumstances such as Lucian Freud's son Alex Boyt and Fiona once being next door neighbours right next to the old Mauroo factory, the team is unable to unearth any evidence whatsoever that Freud was involved in the printing of these. When presented to a panel of experts including David Case, Freud's early print dealer; Gill Saunders senior curator of prints at the V&A, and Toby Treves, author of Freud's catalogue raisonné, they do not exclude the possibility Freud might have produced these prints, but without any evidence he did, they are cataloguing them as "after Lucian Freud".
58	5	"What Happened Next? Toulouse-Lautrec"	Rachel Jardine	19 August 2026	TBD
59	6	"What Happened Next? John Lennon's Piano"	Christopher Boreham	26 August 2026	TBD

Selected works featured in series 14

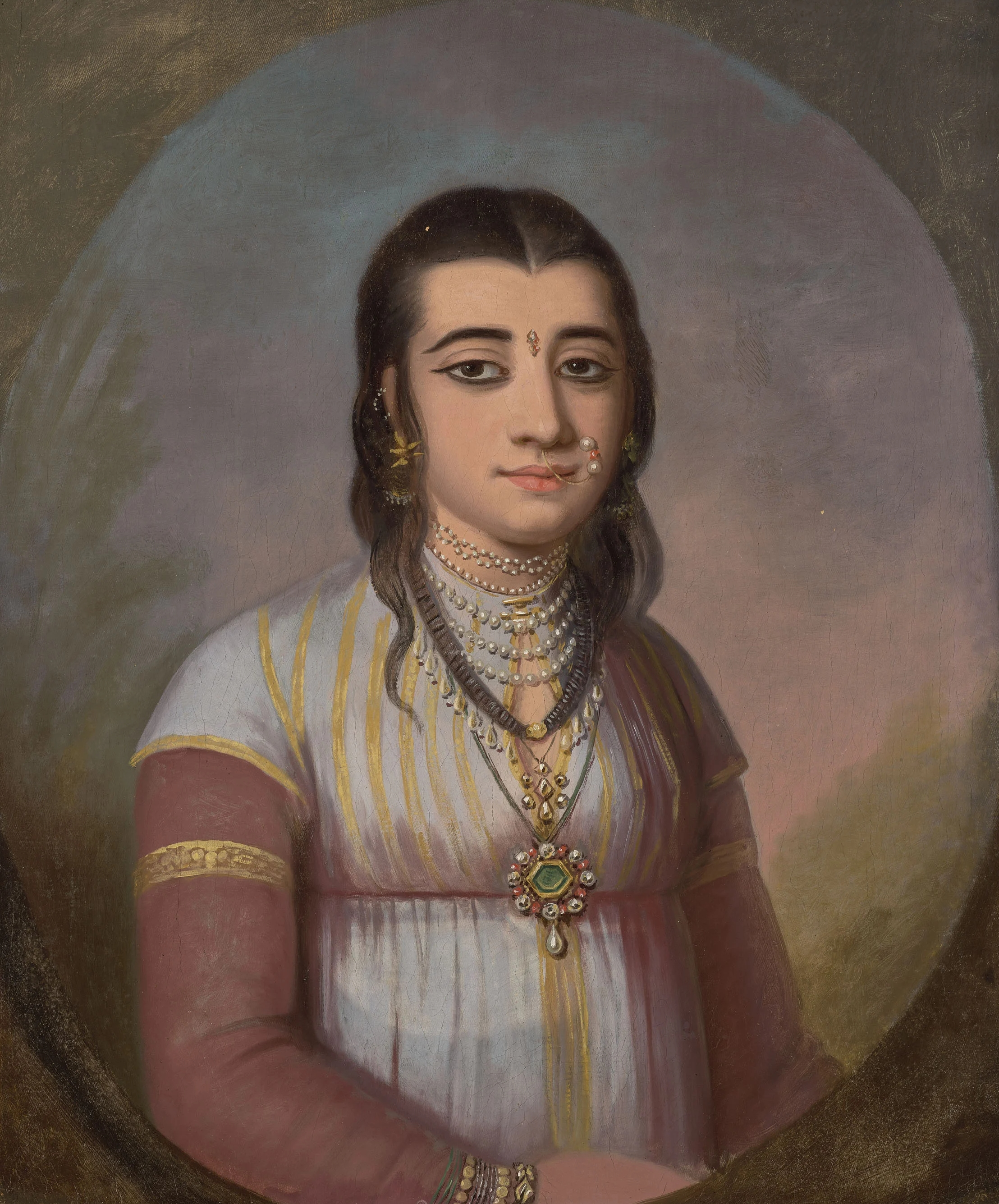
Portrait of an Indian Woman, 1777-1778, attributed to Katherine Read

== Reception ==
The programme has attracted audiences of more than five million viewers in the United Kingdom.

Describing the outcome of the first episode of series one as a "scandal", Sam Wollaston writing for The Guardian found the programme "incredibly interesting" and praised it "for being about just one case in which you can become totally involved, instead of flitting between three, which is what so many documentaries seem to do". In The Daily Telegraph, Ceri Radford was described as being "flabbergasted" at the result of the first episode, but concluded her review by saying: "This may have been a disappointing finale, but it at least confirmed that this aesthetically pleasing, quietly enjoyable new series isn't afraid to thwart expectations." Tom Sutcliffe in The Independent had a mixed view as a result of the presentation of the facts, saying: "It was full of cliffhanger tension and thrilling moments of discovery. But I couldn't entirely shift the suspicion that some of it was just a little too good to be true."

The first programme of the third series, shown in the UK on 19 January 2014, had 4.8 million viewers (a 21.8% audience share) while the first programme of the fourth series attracted 4.85m (24.5%). The record audience for the series was on 12 July 2015 with a peak attendance of 5.8 million viewers (episode 4.2 "Renoir").

Reviewing an episode of the seventh series, Michael Hogan of The Daily Telegraph wrote: "Arts programming is an increasingly endangered beast on prime time television. This absorbing and enjoyable series flies the flag in quietly thrilling fashion."

Benji Wilson, writing for The Daily Telegraph, described the programme, then in its ninth series, as "the art world's answer to Line of Duty".

"An engrossing trip through art history and Churchill’s life," is how Carol Midgley described the first episode of the thirteenth series, "The Mystery of Churchill’s Garden", in a review for The Times."

== International broadcasts ==
The programme had its North American premiere on Canada's TVOntario in 2011. It has also started airing in fall 2013 on PBS and Ovation in October 2019 in syndicated second-run broadcasts after PBS in the United States, and Series 4 has been available on Netflix (as Season 1) since December 2018. The programme airs on ABC in Australia.
