= Rejected (disambiguation) =

Rejected is a 2000 short animated film.

Rejected or The Rejected may also refer to:

- Rejected (EP), a 2005 EP by Ben Jelen
- Rejected (horse), an American Thoroughbred racehorse
- Rejected (painting), by Australian artist Tom Roberts
- The Rejected, a 1961 made-for-television documentary about homosexuality
- The Rejected (Mad Men), an episode of the American television drama series Mad Men
