= Burnstock =

Burnstock is a surname. Notable people with the surname include:

- Geoffrey Burnstock (1929–2020), Australian neurobiologist
- Aviva Burnstock (born 1959), British art conservator, daughter of Geoffrey
