= International Boat Industry =

Business magazine published in the United Kingdom

- Editor: Ed Slack
- Categories: B2B boating industry news
- Frequency: Bi-monthly
- Circulation: 29,000 (print & digital)
- Publisher: BOAT International Media Ltd
- Founded: 1968
- Country: United Kingdom
- Based in: London
- Language: English
- Website: International Boat Industry

International Boat Industry (IBI) is a business magazine focused on the global recreational boating industry, owned by BOAT International Media Ltd.

It is published six times a year. The editor is Ed Slack.

== History ==
The magazine was founded in 1968. It was published by Reed International until 1983. Between 1983 and 1990 IBI was owned by then chief editor and publishing director Nick Hopkinson, who has worked at IBI since its launch. Hopkinson sold the magazine to United Newspapers before buying it back as part of a greater investment consortium in 1995. They sold it to Time Inc. in 1998. In 2017 Time Inc. was acquired by Meredith Corp. Hopkinson then purchased IBI for the third time with his management team, when Time Inc. decided to close the magazine.

The headquarters of the magazine is in London.
