= Aviva Burnstock =

Art conservator

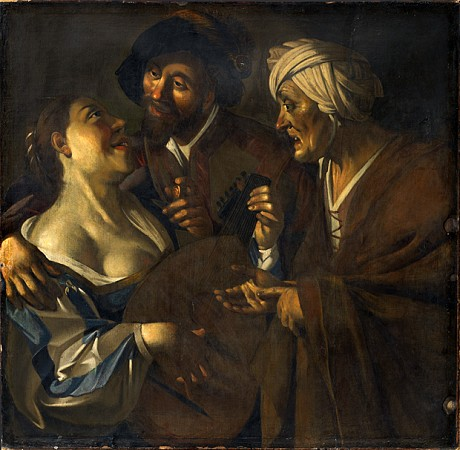
The forgery of Dirck van Baburen's The Procuress by Han van Meegeren in the Courtauld Gallery.

Aviva Ruth Burnstock (born 1959) is head of the Department of Art Conservation & Technology at the Courtauld Institute, London. Professor Burnstock is a graduate of the University of Sussex (BSc. Neurobiology 1981) and took in 1991 a PhD at the Courtauld Institute

Burnstock has been featured in several episodes of the BBC One television series Fake or Fortune?, including the third episode of the first series where Burnstock in 2011 was member of a team that confirmed the painting The Procuress in the Courtauld's collection – a version of a 1622 work by Dirck van Baburen now in the Museum of Fine Arts, Boston – is an Oil paint-Bakelite forgery by Han van Meegeren made in the 1930s or 1940s.

She is Fellow of the International Institute for Conservation.

== Personal life ==
She is the daughter of the neurobiologist Geoffrey Burnstock and married since 1989 to Hugh Sebag-Montefiore.

== Selected publications ==
- "The application of scanning electron microscopy (SEM) to the examination of painting materials with special reference to cleaning and blanching", Thesis (Ph.D.), Courtauld Institute of Art, University of London, 1991
- "A technical study of Cassone panels from the Courtauld Gallery", Tilly Schmidt, Caroline Campbell, Aviva Burnstock, for Zeitschrift für Kunsttechnologie und Konservierung ZKK 23/2 2010, 315–326, ISSN 0931-7198
- "Impressionist paintings in the Courtauld Gallery: making inferences from recent technical studies", Zeitschrift für Kunsttechnologie und Konservierung ZKK 2009/1 72–79.
- "Water sensitivity of modern artists' oil paints", L. Mills, A. Burnstock, H. van Keulen, F. Duarte and K.J. van den Berg, ICOM Committee for Conservation 15th Triennial Meeting, New Delhi, 2008, .651-659.
- "A non-invasive XRF study supported by multivariate statistical analysis and reflectance FTIR to assess the composition of modern painting materials", Francesca Rossi, Aviva Burnstock, Klaas JanVan den Berg, Costanza Miliani, Brunetto Giovanni Brunetti and Antonio Sgamellotti, Spectrochimica Acta vol 71/5 2009, 1655–1662.
- Painting in Britain, 1500-1630 : production, influences, and patronage. Cooper, Tarnya; Burnstock, Aviva; Howard, Maurice; Town, Edward, eds. (First ed.). Oxford: Oxford University Press. ISBN 9780197265840. OCLC 907131366.
