= Rejected (painting) =

Painting by Tom Roberts

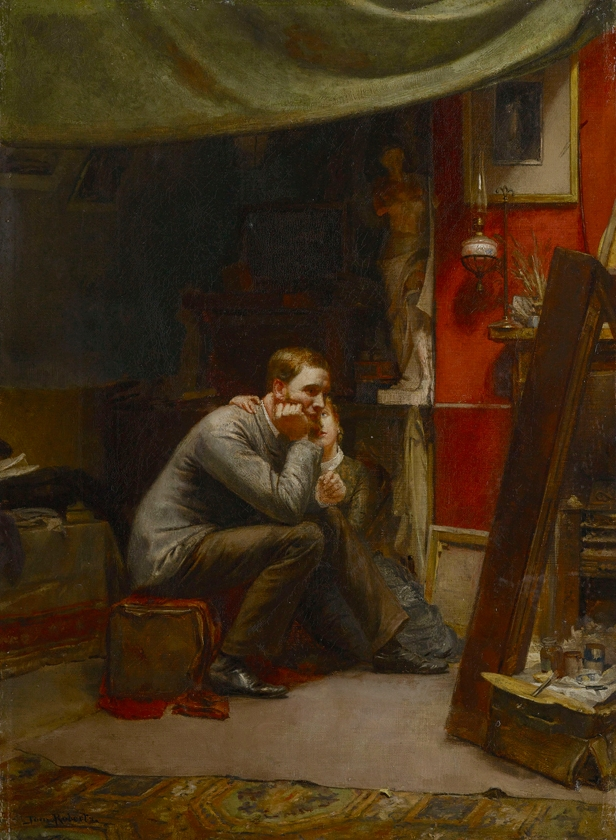
- Artist: Tom Roberts
- Year: 1883
- Medium: oil on canvas

Rejected is an 1883 painting by the Australian artist Tom Roberts. The painting depicts an early self portrait of the artist.

The painting was featured in an episode of the BBC show Fake or Fortune? which first aired in September 2017.

== Composition ==
The oil on canvas painting is set within an artist's studio and features a central figure of a seated artist, gazing ruefully at an unseen canvas, with his chin resting on his hand. A partially obscured female figure sits on the floor seemingly consoling the artist. The title, "Rejected", perhaps implies that the unseen painting has been rejected for display in an exhibition and is the cause for the artist's apparent sorrow. The work is believed to be a rare self-portrait of Tom Roberts, accompanied by his wife, Lillie.

== History and authentication ==
Little is known about the history of painting, with no substantial provenance available for the work. Its known history begins in 2013 when it was listed by Bamfords Auctioneers in the United Kingdom as a work by Roberts, with an estimate of between £60 and £100. It sold to Australian art collectors Rosanna and Joe Natoli for £7,500.

The painting was subsequently submitted for verification by Roberts expert, Helen Topliss, author of a Roberts catalogue raisonné. Topliss found inconsistencies with the painting's brushwork, composition and signature and determined the work was not an authentic painting by Roberts.

In December 2016, the BBC series Fake or Fortune agreed to investigate the work. Scientific analysis by the team identified that the work was from the correct period for Roberts (late 19th century) with some newer restoration work present. Infrared scanning highlighted an inscription, including the work's title Rejected and an address on the back of the painting. Investigation into the Royal Academy of Arts archives found the addressed matched that of Roberts whilst he was a student at the academy between 1881 and 1884.

Further investigation found a series of preparatory drawings in original sketchbooks by Roberts, held by the Mitchell Library in Sydney, which showed a strong resemblance to the pose struck by the artist in the painting. Stylistic similarities with other authenticated works by Roberts, such as Mrs L. A. Abrahams, were also noted. After the painting was shown to Lisa Roberts, the great-granddaughter of Roberts, she strongly believed the work to be authentic and suggested that it was a self portrait of her great grandfather.

As part of the Fake or Fortune episode, the work was presented to another Roberts expert, Mary Eagle of the Art Gallery of New South Wales. Although she noted some concerns with elements of the painting, she determined that it was indeed an early work by Roberts.

The work was later made available for sale through the Philip Bacon Galleries with an estimate of over A$500,000.

== See also ==
- List of paintings by Tom Roberts
