= Cromwell Opening the Coffin of Charles I =

Painting by Paul Delaroche

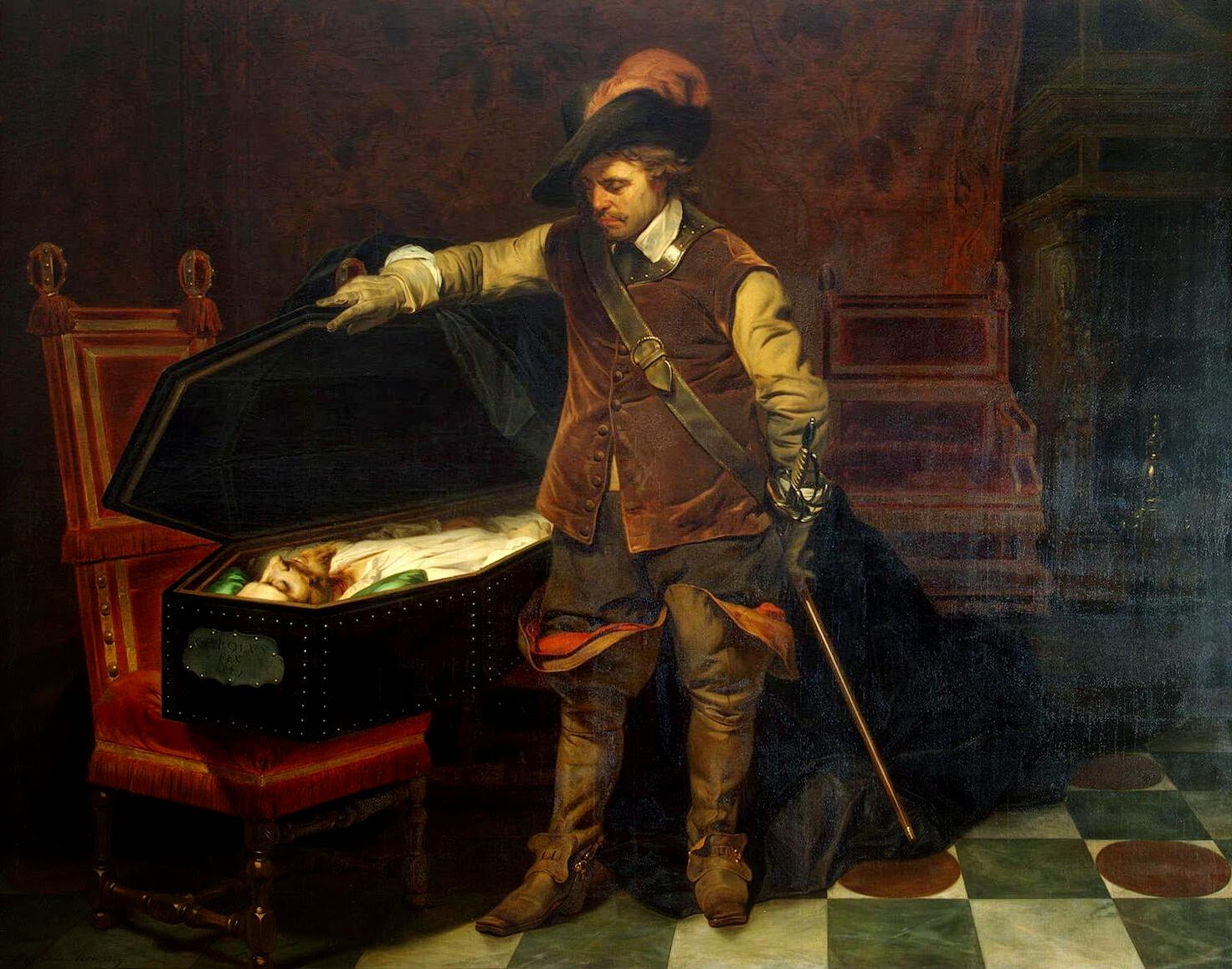
- Artist: Paul Delaroche
- Year: 1831
- Medium: Oil on canvas
- Dimensions: 228.5 cm × 295.5 cm (90.0 in × 116.3 in)
- Location: Musée des Beaux-Arts de Nîmes, Nîmes

Cromwell Opening the Coffin of Charles I (French: Cromwell découvrant le cercueil de Charles Ier or simply Cromwell et Charles Ier) is an oil on canvas painting by Paul Delaroche from 1831. It can be seen in the Musée des Beaux-Arts de Nîmes.

== Creation ==
For the painting, Delaroche had a model with plaster figures made by stage designers of the Paris opera. His preparatory sketch of Cromwell's head has been preserved. It is also known that he extensively documented himself on Cromwell's attire.

== Theme ==
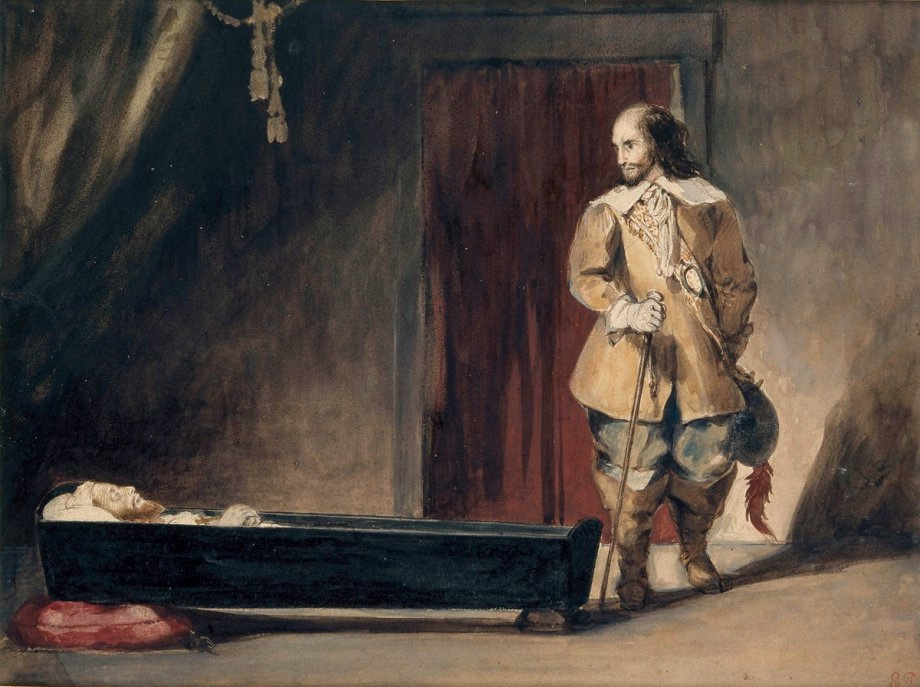
Cromwell with the Coffin of Charles I (Delacroix, 1831): a troubled Cromwell, who accidentally stumbled upon the coffin, uncovers his head, keeps his distance, and is unsure whether to approach or leave.

The painting depicts how Oliver Cromwell, during the English Civil War, opens the coffin of Charles I in Whitehall to examine his decapitated body. This legend – for it is not a historical event – was brought to life by historian François Guizot, who even had Cromwell lift the severed head. In the works of Walter Scott and Victor Hugo there are literary confrontations between Cromwell and Charles that may have inspired Delaroche. In his note for the Paris Salon of 1831, he quoted from Les Quatre Stuarts by Chateaubriand (1828), where a proud Cromwell convinces himself that the head is truly separated from the body and remarks that such a well-built man could have lived many more years. However, Delaroche's Cromwell does not reveal his state of mind so easily. With a somber frown, he examines the sharply lit corpse, with its reattached head and the bright red wound. The psychological ambiguity allows the viewer to see in Cromwell either grief or gloating triumph, and in Charles either a martyr or a defeated obstinate.

Delaroche's painting inevitably reminded viewers of the French regicide of 1793, especially since France was still shaken by the July Revolution at the time of its completion. The question arises what contemporary analogies Delaroche seemed to invite, although he denied this himself. Heinrich Heine was not the only one who wondered: if Charles I represents the beheaded Louis XVI, can we see Napoleon in Cromwell? In a broader sense, he perceived a world-historical struggle between the principles of heredity (Charles) and competence (Cromwell).

== Reception ==
The neoclassical-romantic history painting received mixed reactions at the 1831 Salon, where Delaroche exhibited no less than four works. His Cromwell attracted the most audience of the entire exhibition. This may have been due to morbid fascination or the feeling of participating in the taboo of a regicide. The new viewing culture that Delaroche helped shape had a direct impact on the viewer.

Critic Horace de Viel-Castel dedicated a laudatory review to the painting, while his colleague Victor Schoelcher rated the idea behind it higher than the aesthetics. Delacroix responded that same year with a painting that depicted the theme in a radically different way: a hesitant Cromwell in a small-format watercolor. This negative judgment on Cromwell Opening the Coffin of Charles I is also found in the writings of Baudelaire and Théophile Gautier ("That pair of bones looking like a violin case"').
