= Portrait of Louise Vernet =

Painting by Horace Vernet

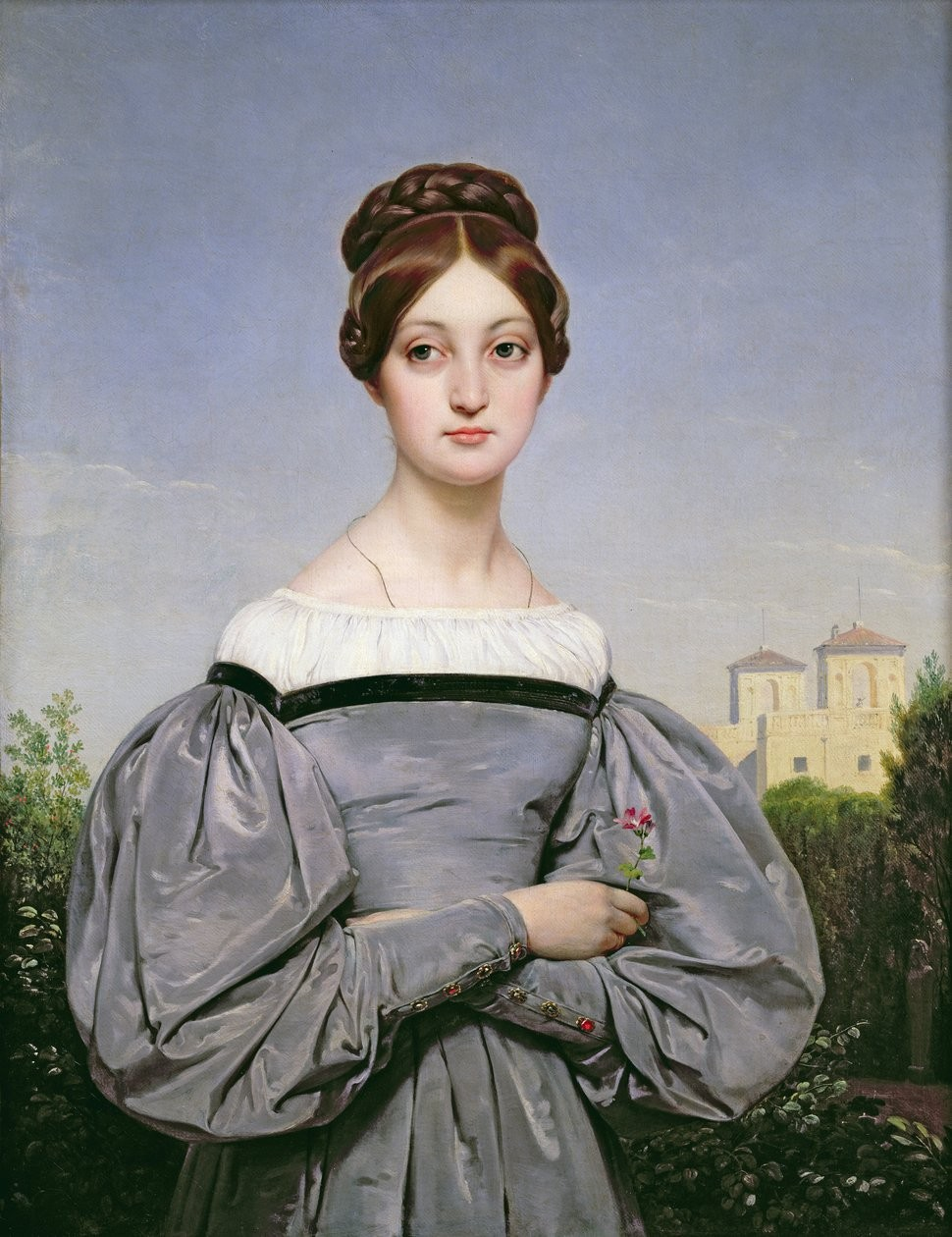
- Artist: Horace Vernet
- Year: c. 1830
- Type: Oil on canvas, portrait painting
- Dimensions: 100 cm × 74 cm (39 in × 29 in)
- Location: Louvre; Paris

Portrait of Louise Vernet is a c. 1830 portrait painting by the French artist Horace Vernet depicting his daughter Louise Vernet. While Vernet was known for his battle and history paintings, he also produced a number of portraits during his career.

Around sixteen years old when she sat for the portrait, Louise later became the wife of the artist Paul Delaroche. At the time Horace Vernet was serving as director of the French Academy in Rome. He shows his daughter in the latest Parisian fashions with the gardens of the Villa Medici, which houses the Academy, in the background. The critic Gustave Planche felt the painting didn't reflect classical aesthetics. However, Vernet had deliberately set out to paint his daughter in the style of Renaissance Art. He originally portrayed Louise holding a rose but altered this to a mallow to emphasise her naturalness. Louise sat for several artists before and during her married life.

It was exhibited at the Paris Salon of 1831. Today the painting is in the collection of the Louvre in Paris.

== Bibliography ==
- Harkett, Daniel & Hornstein, Katie (ed.) Horace Vernet and the Thresholds of Nineteenth-Century Visual Culture. Dartmouth College Press, 2017.
- Jiminez, Jill Berk (ed.) Dictionary of Artists' Models. Routledge, 2013.
