= Portrait of Lady Caroline Montagu =

Painting by George Hayter

Portrait of Caroline Montagu
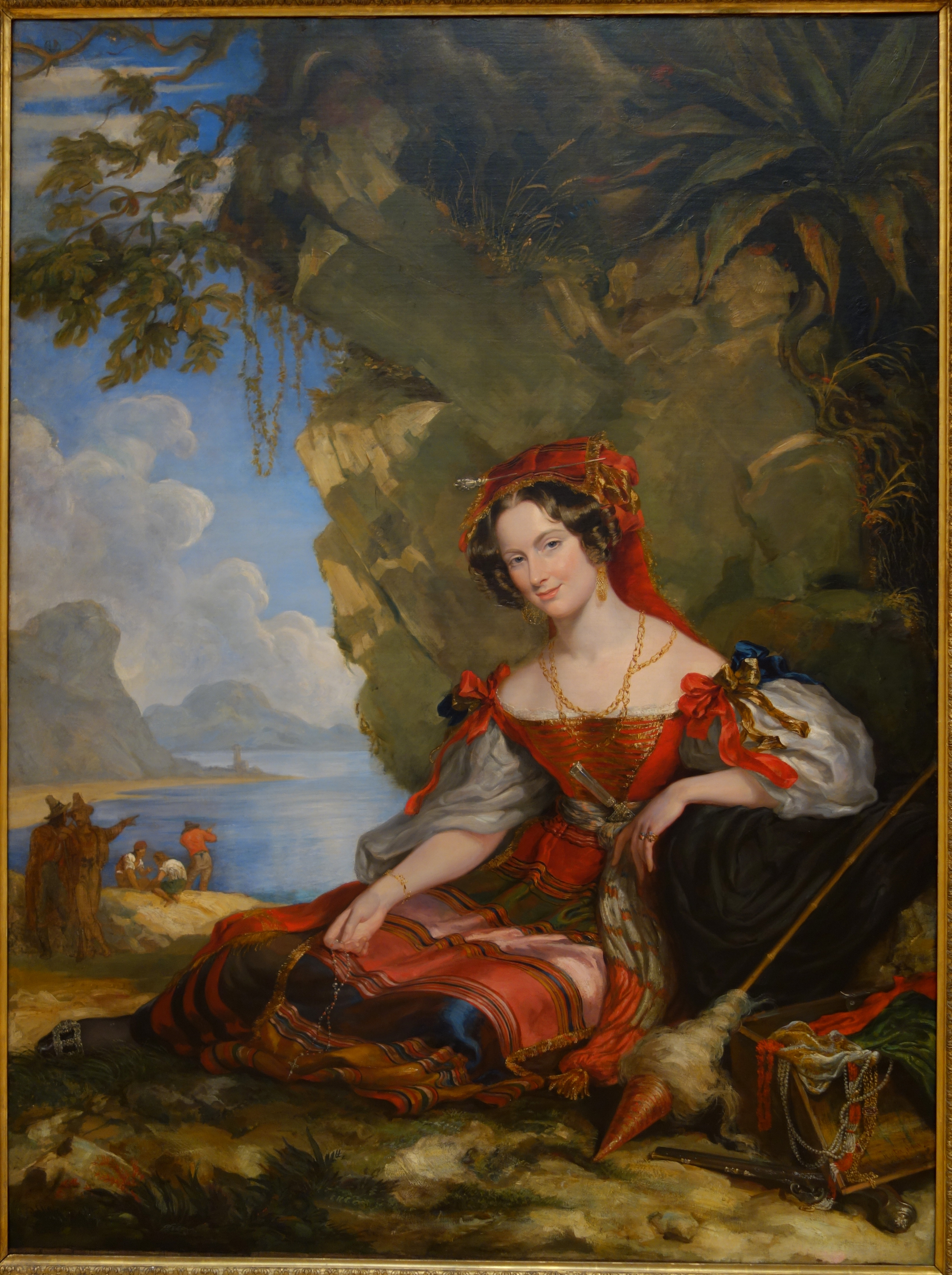
- Artist: George Hayter
- Year: 1831
- Type: Oil on canvas, portrait painting
- Dimensions: 196.2 cm × 146.7 cm (77.25 in × 57.75 in)
- Location: Chazen Museum of Art, Madison

Portrait of Lady Caroline Montagu is an oil on canvas portrait painting by the English artist George Hayter, from 1831.

== History and description ==
It depicts the British aristocrat Lady Caroline Montagu. She was the daughter of the Duke of Manchester and the wife of the Tory Member of Parliament John Calcraft. She is portrayed in Byronic style as Haidée from the poem Don Juan by Lord Byron, with her costume combining fashionable British evening dress and a headdress of Neapolitan peasant costume.

Hayter was from a family of painters and made his breakthrough with his The Trial of Queen Caroline in 1823 during the later Regency era. Subsequently he became known for his depictions of the young Queen Victoria. The painting was exhibited at the Paris Salon of 1831 where he was considered one of three artists competing to be the successor to Thomas Lawrence. Today it is in the collection of the Chazen Museum of Art in Madison, Wisconsin.

== Bibliography ==
- Noon, Patrick & Bann, Stephen. Constable to Delacroix: British Art and the French Romantics. Tate, 2003.
- Plunkett, John. Queen Victoria: First Media Monarch. Oxford University Press, 2003.
