= Salon of 1831 =

1831 art exhibition in Paris

Liberty Leading the People by Eugène Delacroix

The Salon of 1831 was an art exhibition held at the Louvre in Paris between June and August 1831. It was the first Salon during the July Monarchy and the first to be held since the Salon of 1827, as a planned exhibition of 1830 was cancelled due to the French Revolution of 1830.

== Exhibition ==
Liberty Leading the People by Eugène Delacroix was amongst the most notable works exhibited. Painted in Romantic style it depicts the recent July Revolution that had brought the reigning monarch Louis Philippe I to power over his cousin Charles X. It features the Liberty (also identified at Marianne) leading the Paris crowds forwards. The revolution was also represented in two paintings in The Battle of Rue de Rohan and The Battle of Porte Saint-Denis by Hippolyte Lecomte. Also on display were two portraits by Alexandre-Marie Colin of the poet Jean-Georges Farcy, killed during the storming of the Tuileries Palace.

History paintings on display featured several works by Paul Delaroche who included two scenes from British history The Children of Edward depicting the Princes in the Tower and Cromwell Opening the Coffin of Charles I. Eugène Delacroix also exhibited The Murder of the Bishop of Liège based on a scene from the novel Quentin Durward by Walter Scott.

Horace Vernet, the director of the French Academy in Rome sent in several portraits he had produced in Italy including Portrait of Louise Vernet depicting his daughter and future wide of Paul Delaroche. His other works on display included Italian Brigands Surprised by Papal Troops. The Salon featured elements of Orientalism, an increasingly fashionable genre that would grow through subsequent years in the wake of the French invasion of Algeria in 1830.

It was followed by the Salon of 1833, the last time the Salon was staged biannually as future exhibitions from 1834 were held every year.

== Gallery ==
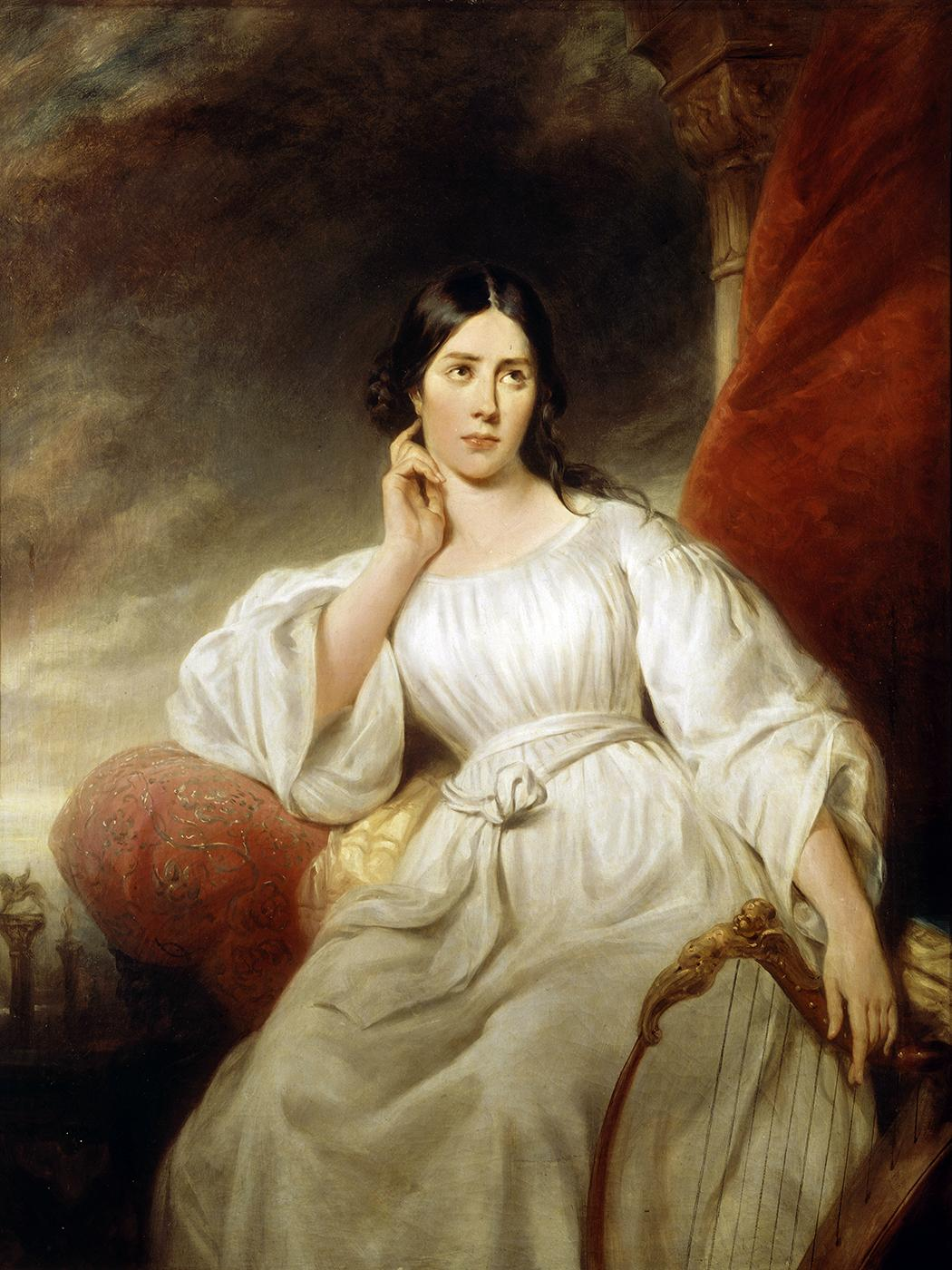
Maria Malibran as Desdemona by Henri Decaisne

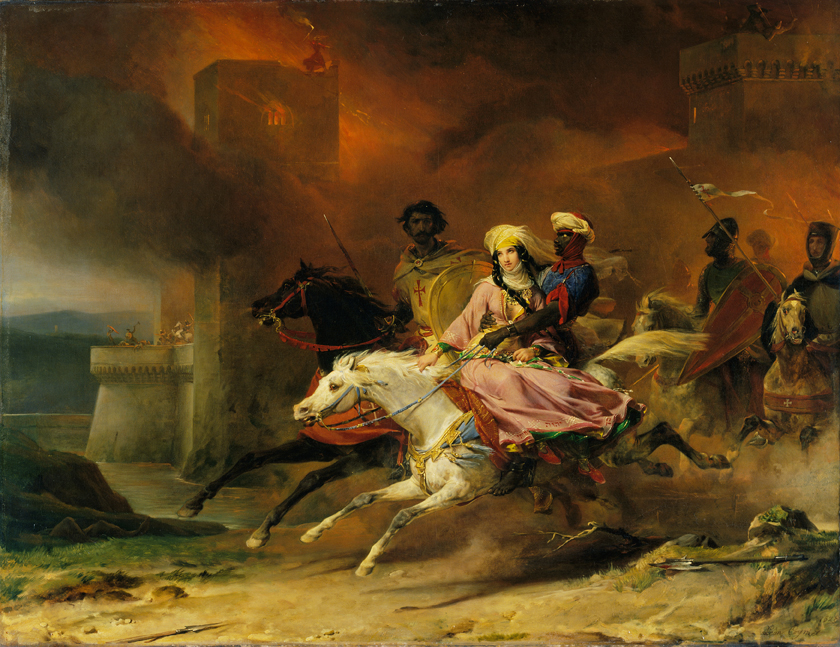
Rebecca and Brian de Bois-Guilbert by Leon Cogniet

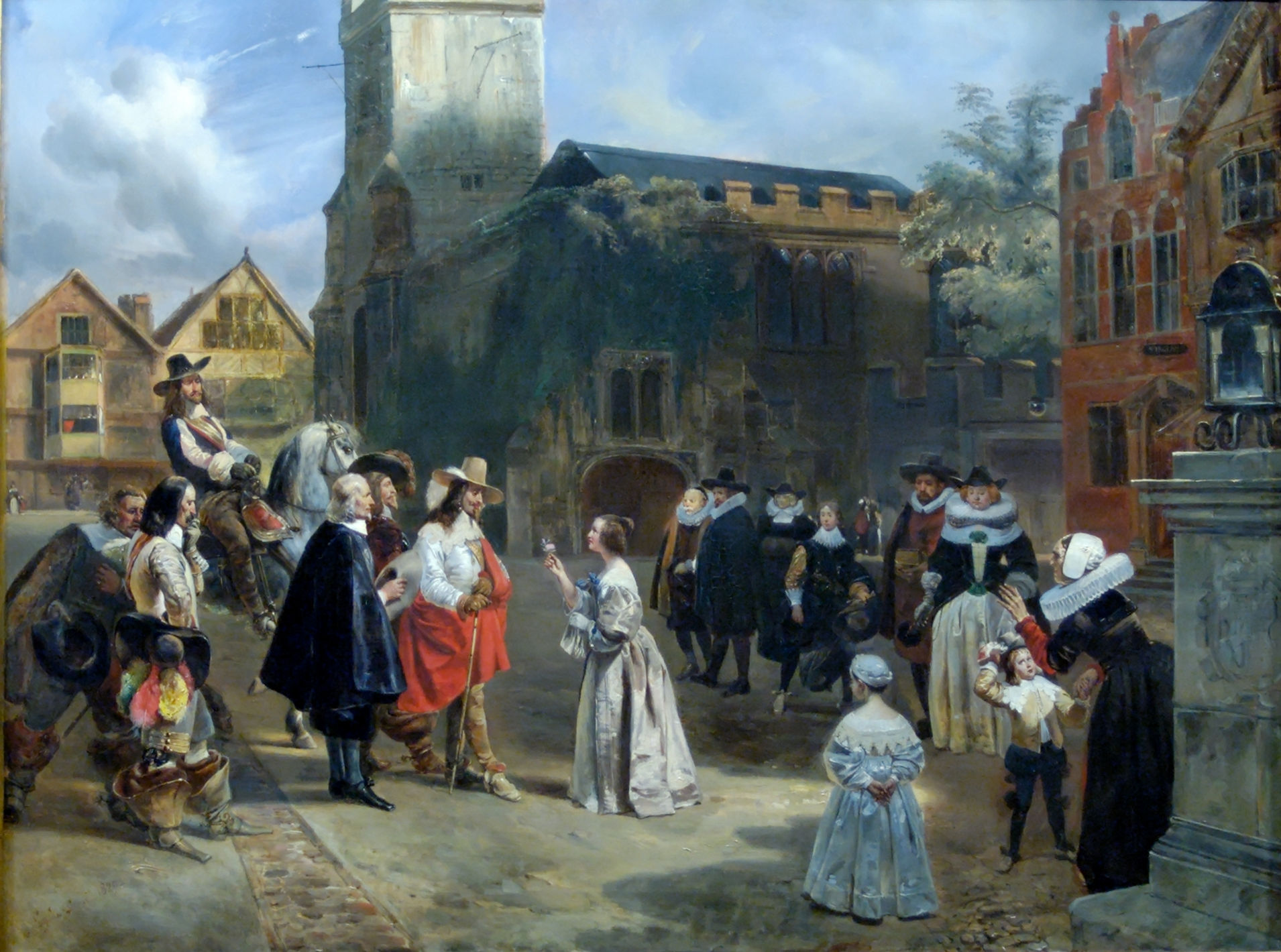
Subject taken from the life of Charles I by Eugène Lami

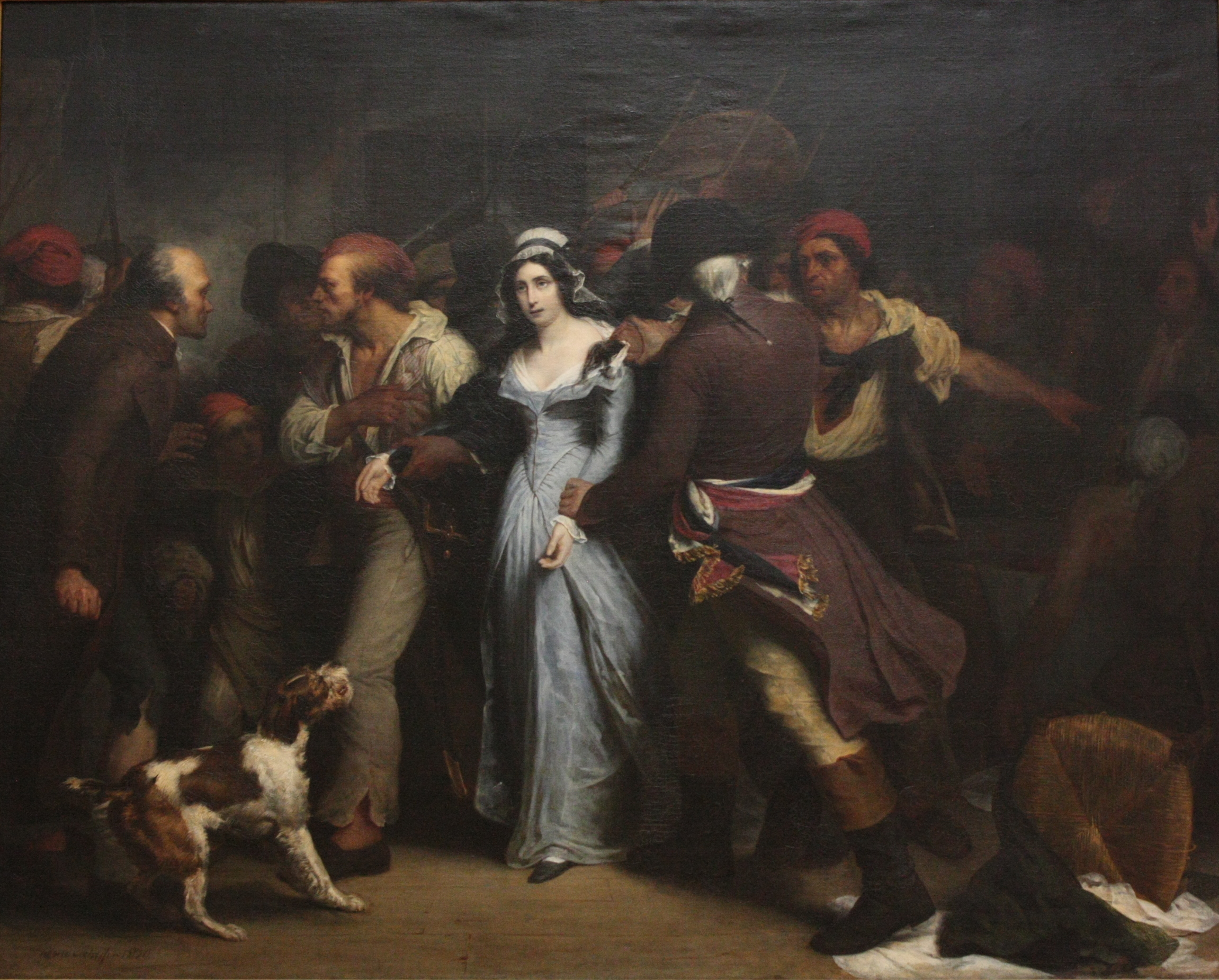
The Arrest of Charlotte Corday by Hendrik Scheffer

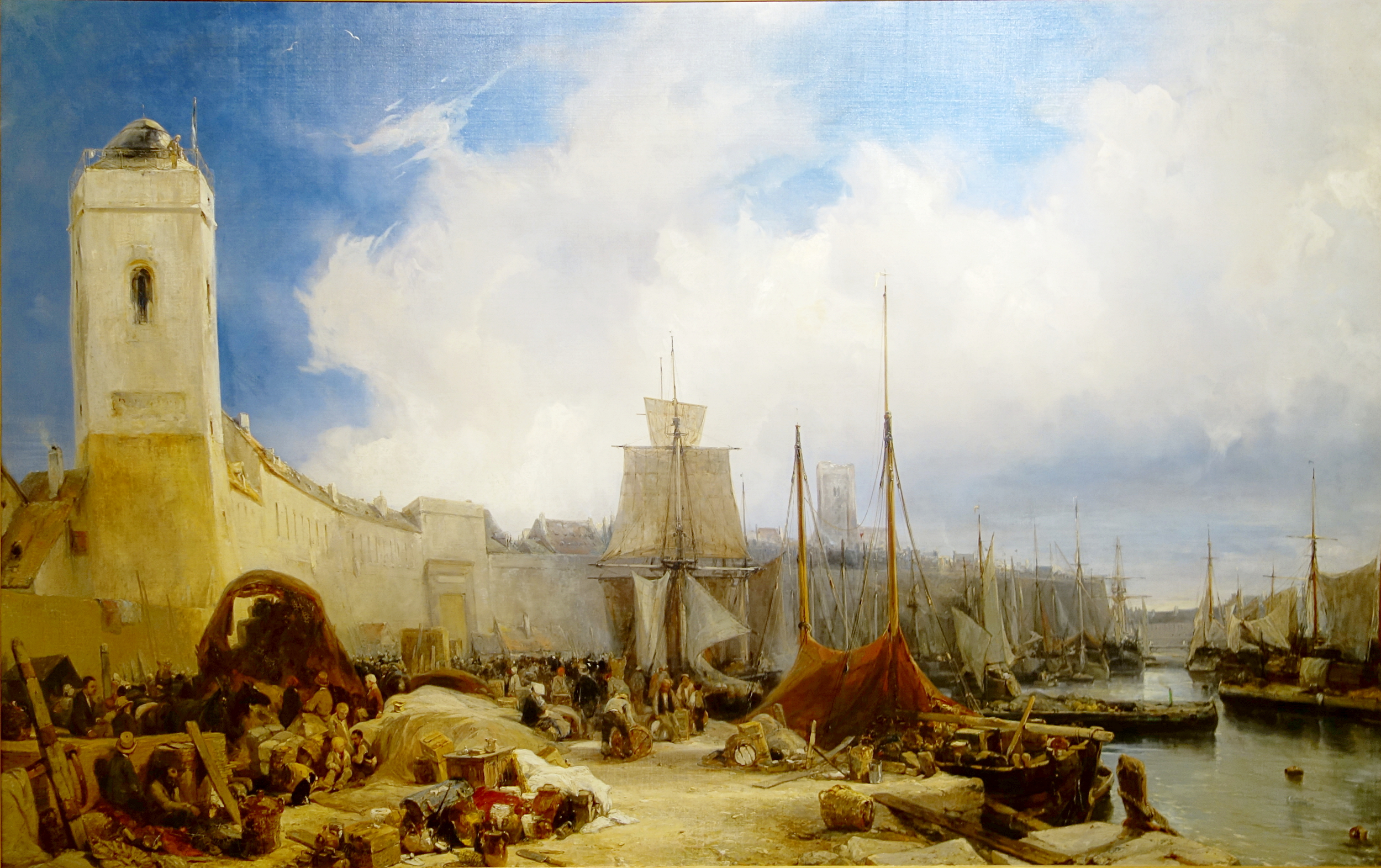
The Port of Dunkirk by Eugène Isabey

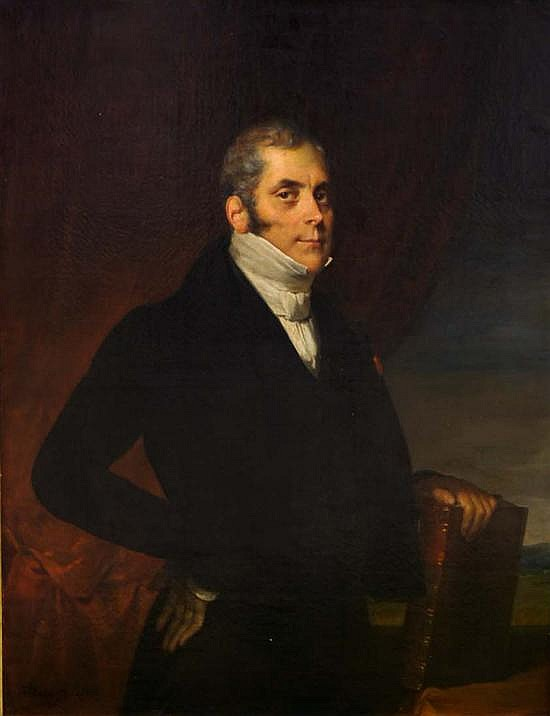
Portrait of Daniel-François-Esprit Auber by Hortense Haudebourt-Lescot

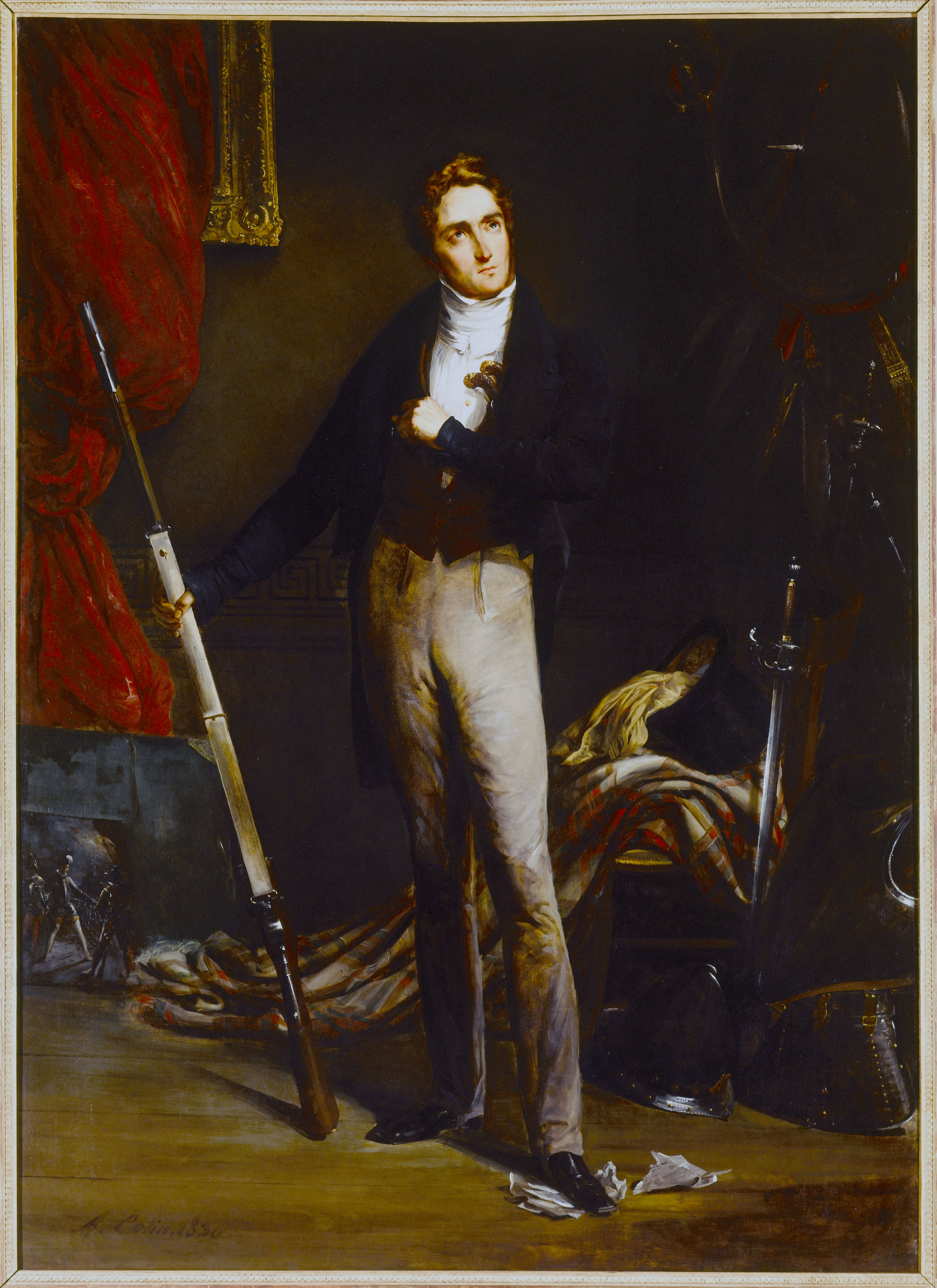
Portrait of Jean-Georges Farcy by Alexandre-Marie Colin

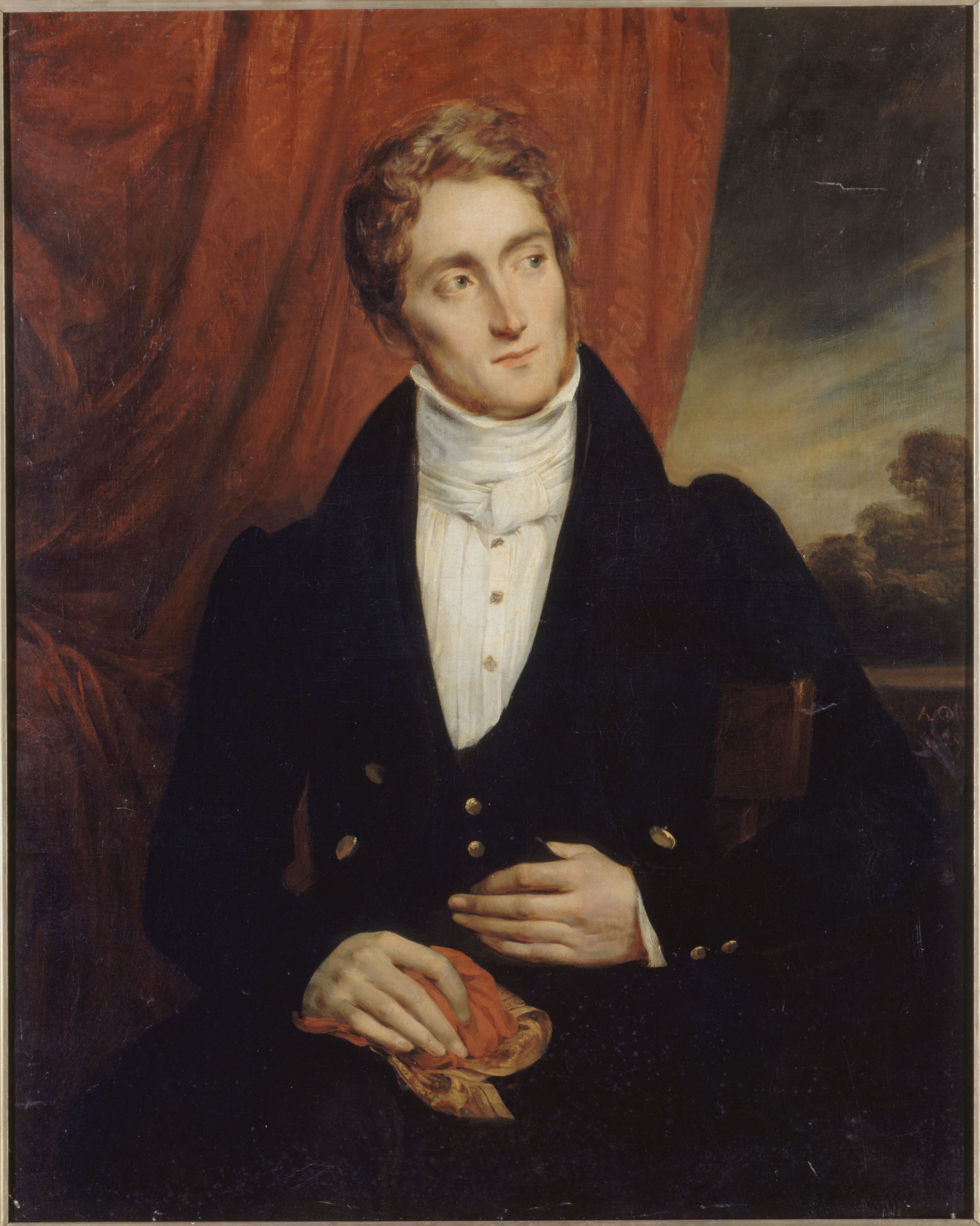
Portrait of Jean-Georges Farcy by Alexandre-Marie Colin

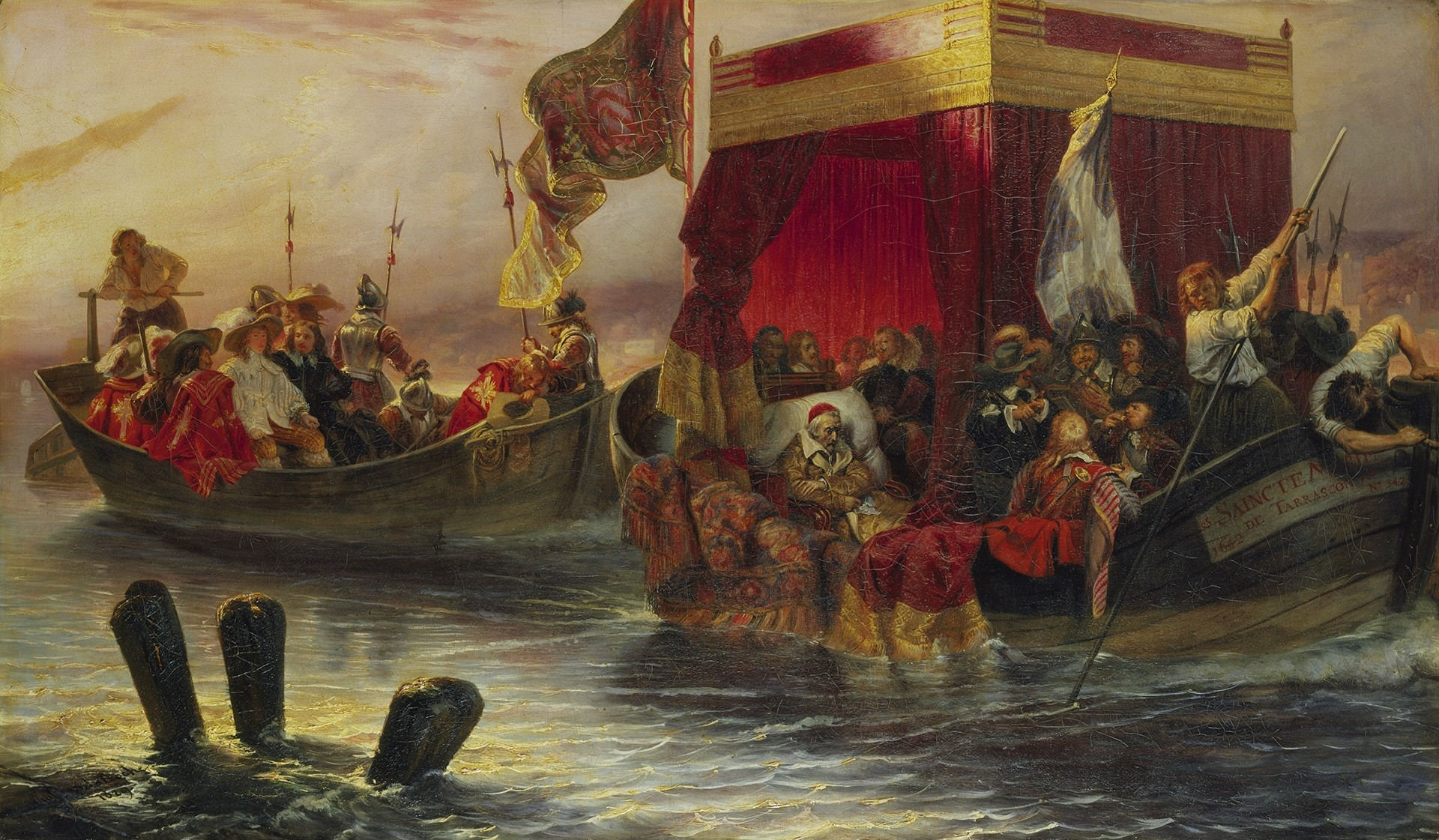
The State Barge of Cardinal Richelieu on the Rhône by Paul Delaroche

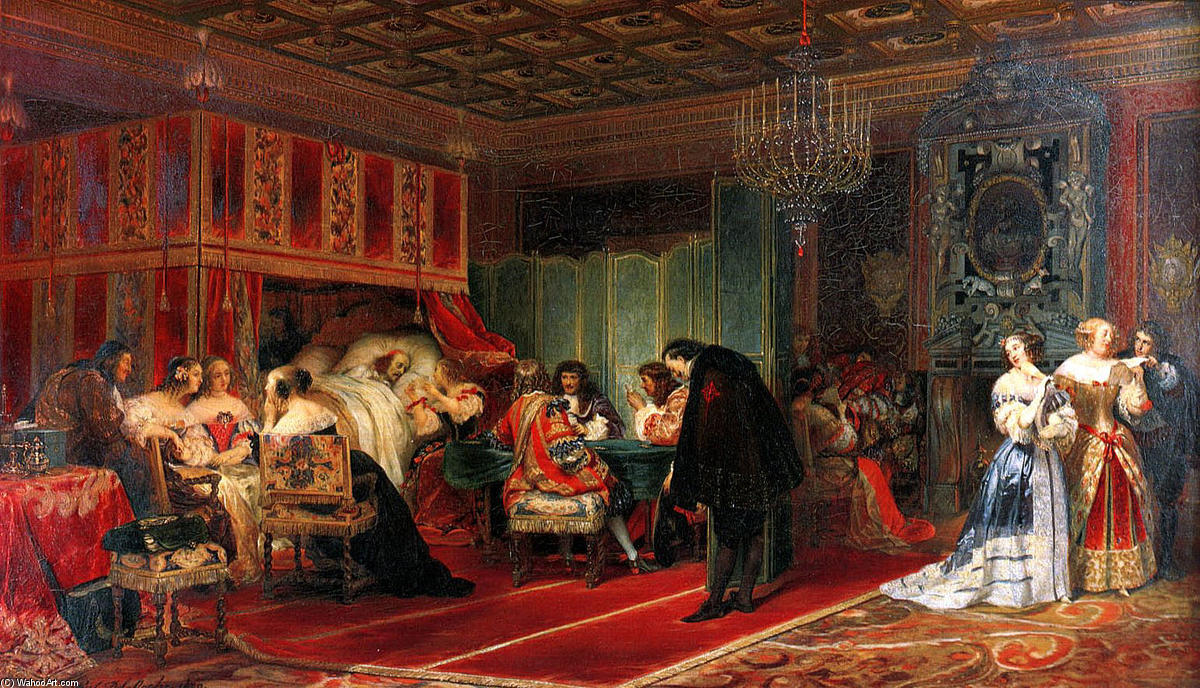
Cardinal Mazarin Dying by Paul Delaroche

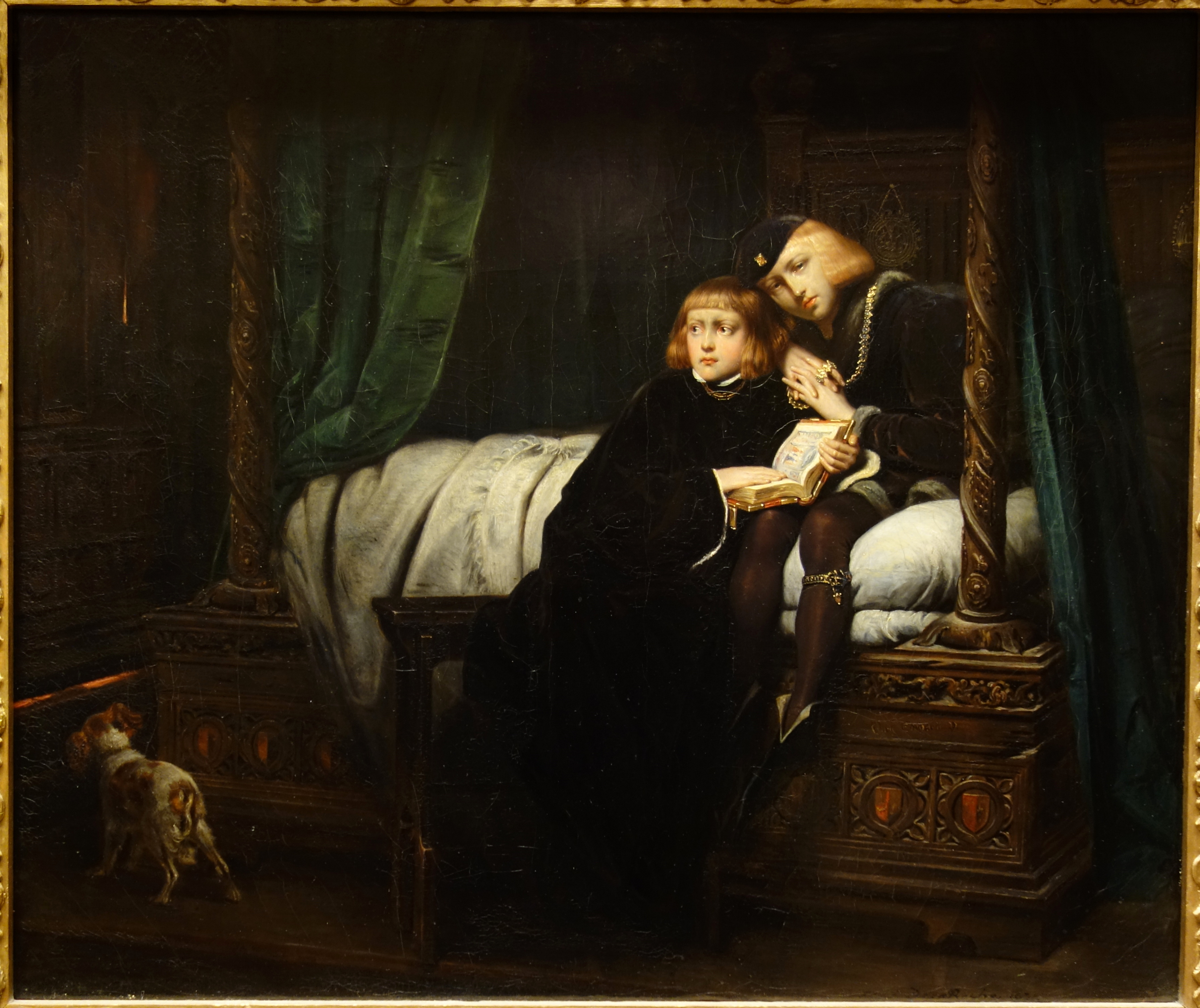
The Children of Edward by Paul Delaroche

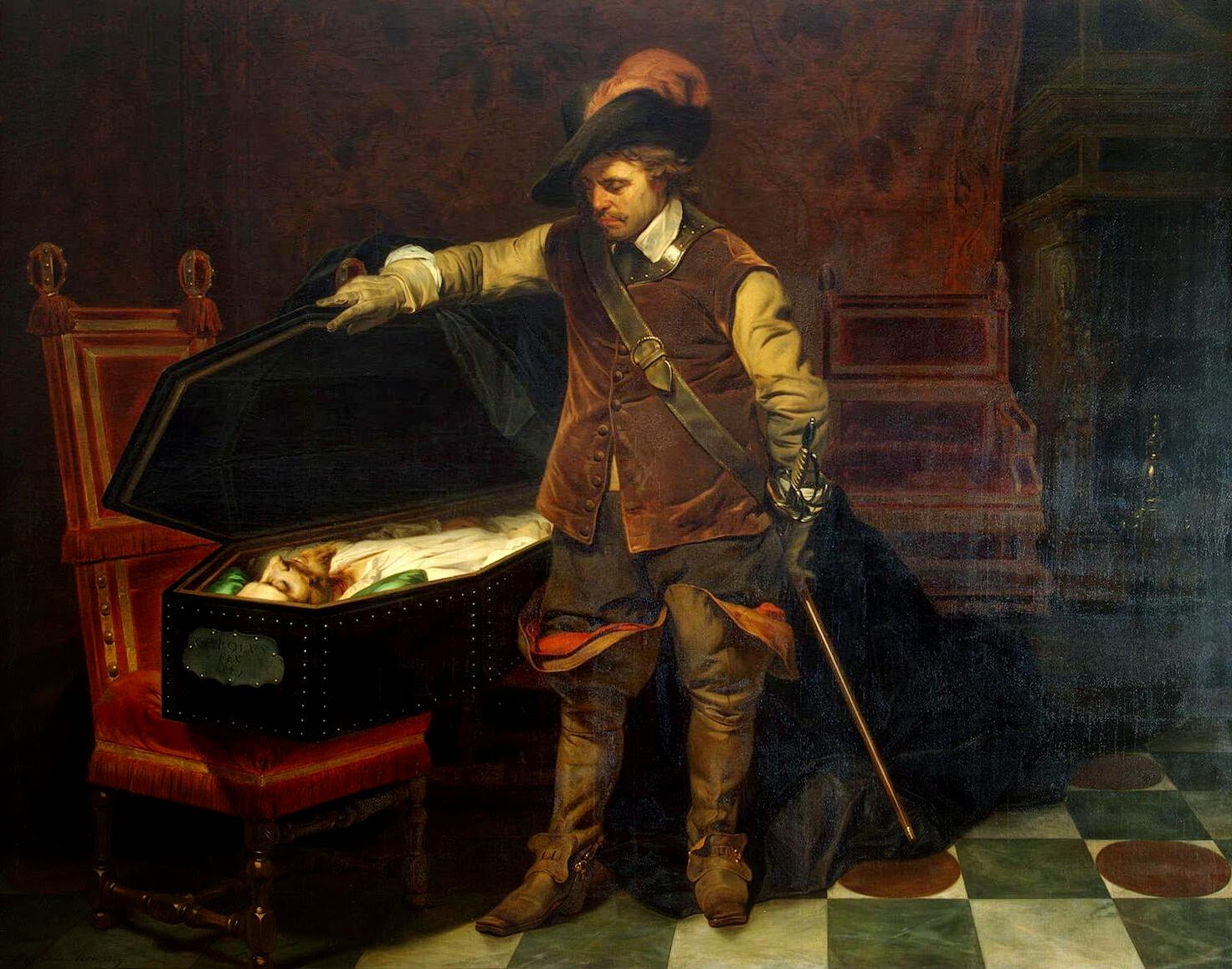
Cromwell Opening the Coffin of Charles I by Paul Delaroche

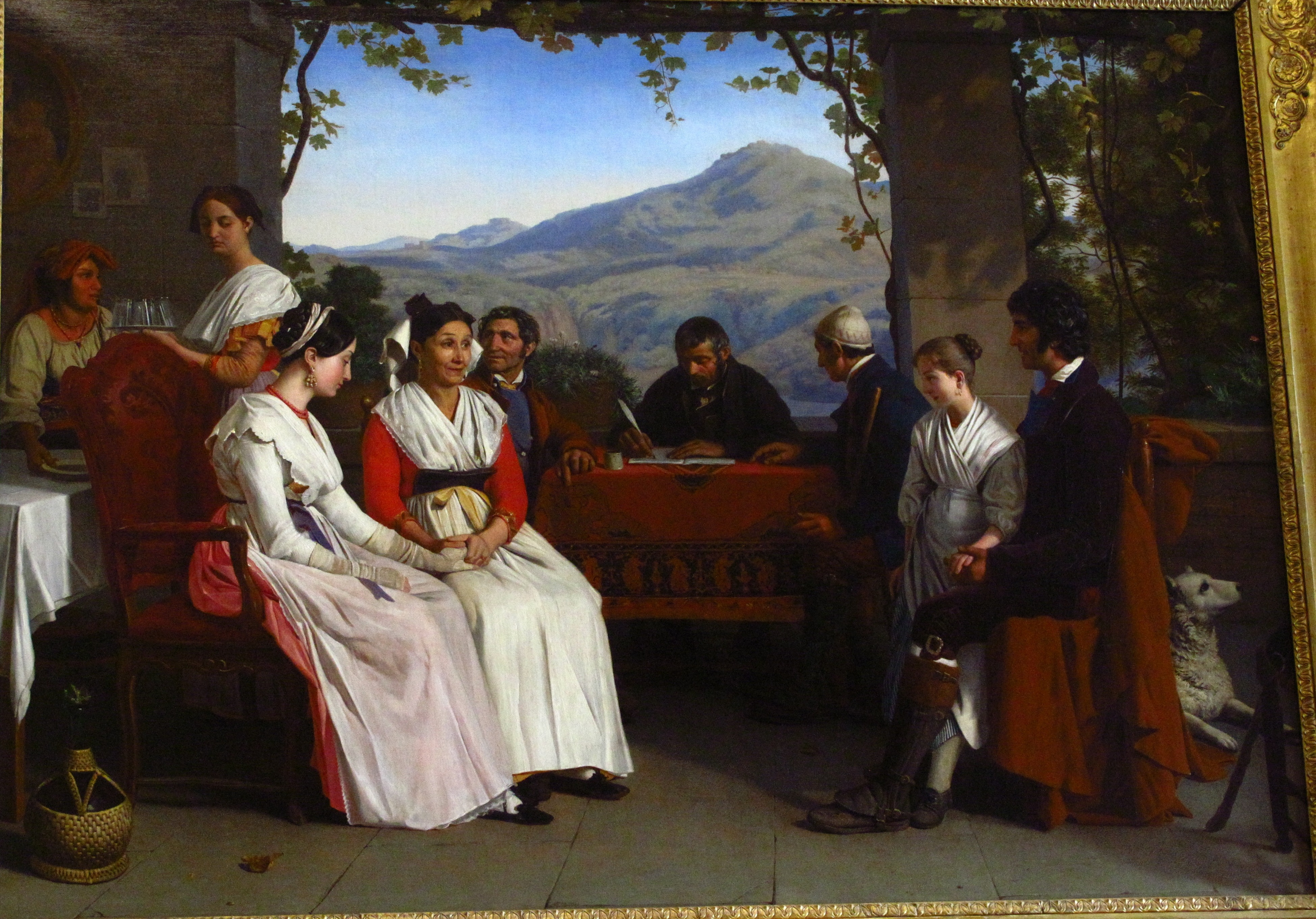
The Marriage Contract by Guillaume Bodinier.

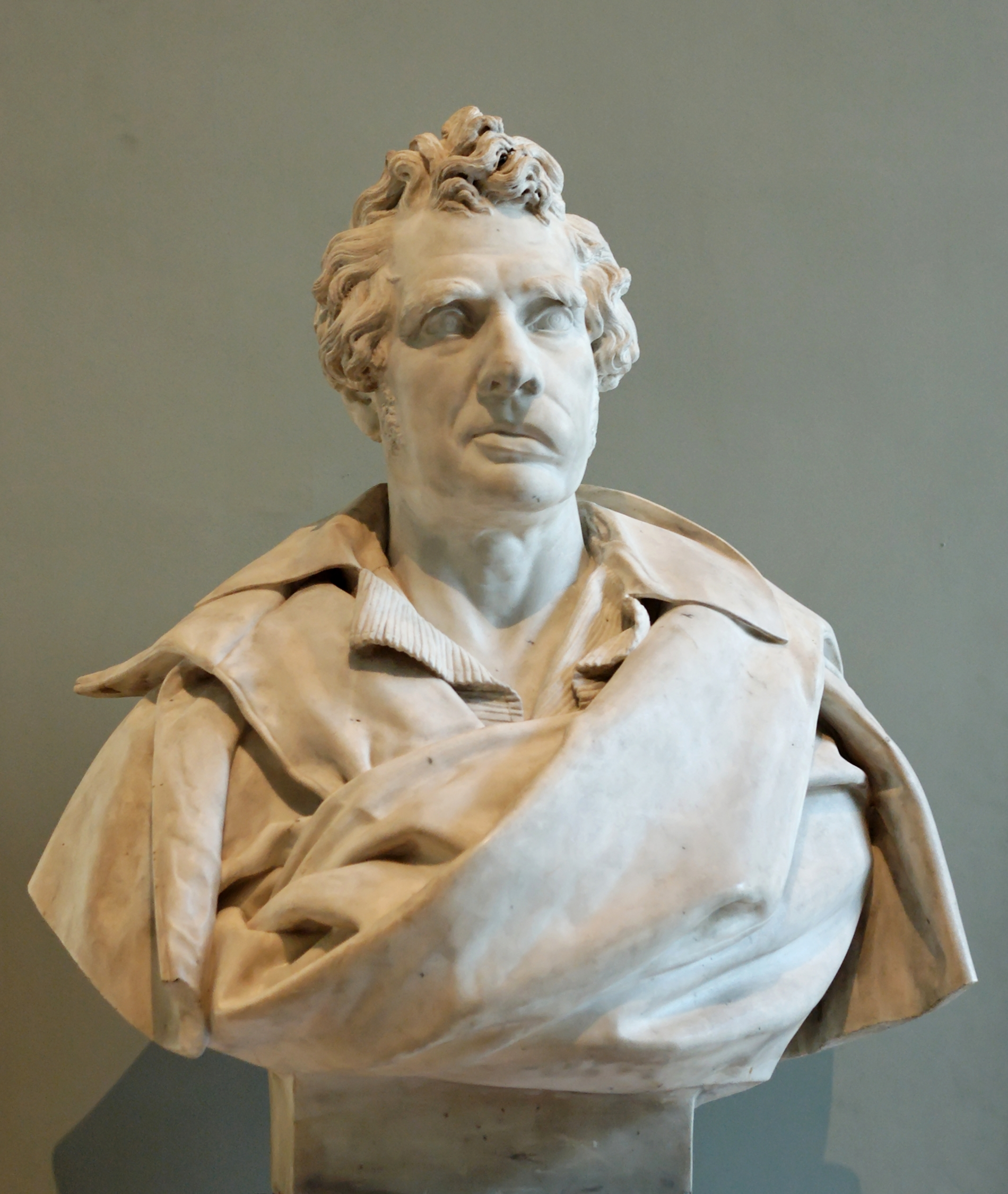
Jacques-Louis David by François Rude

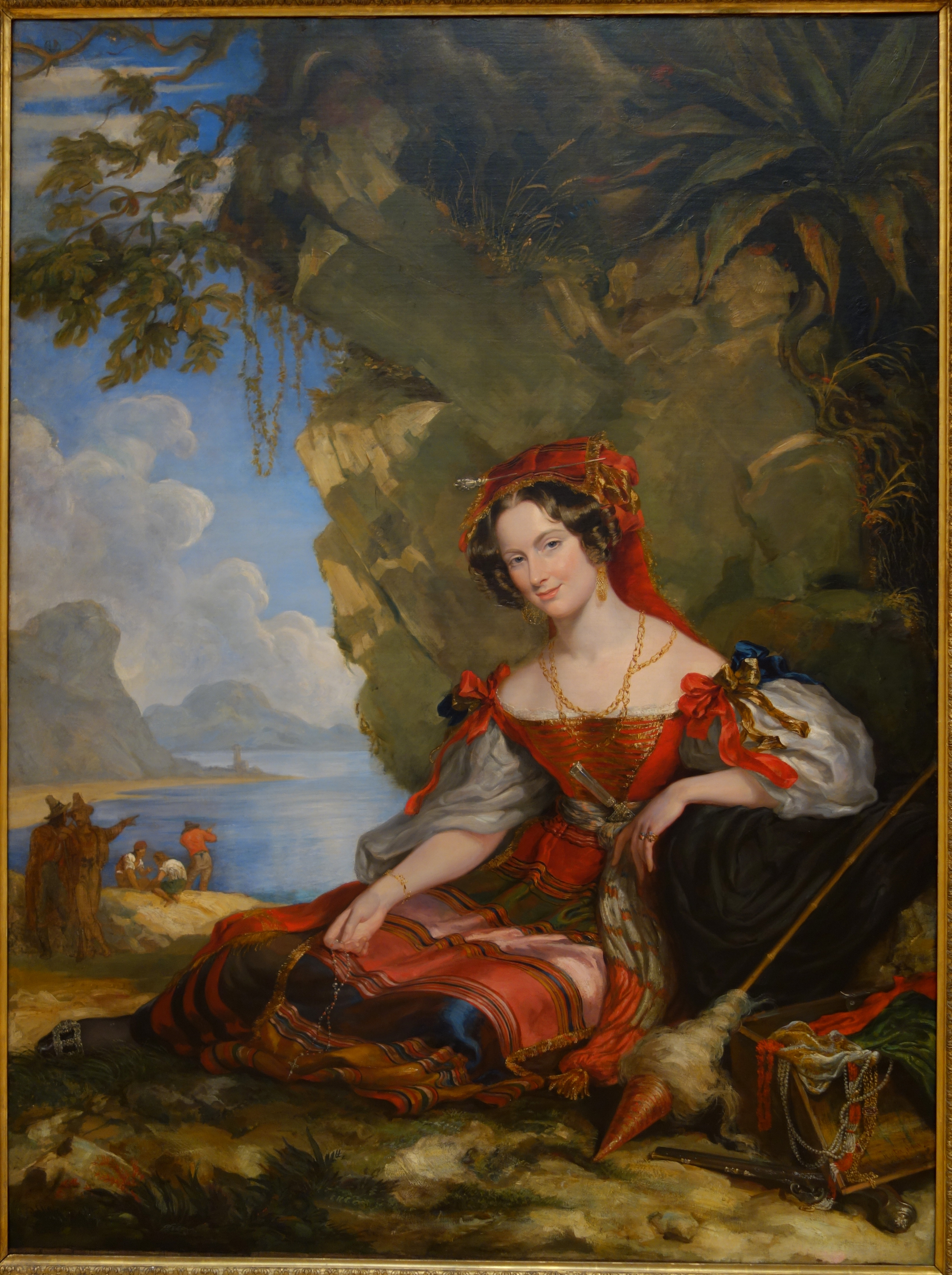
Portrait of Lady Caroline Montagu by George Hayter

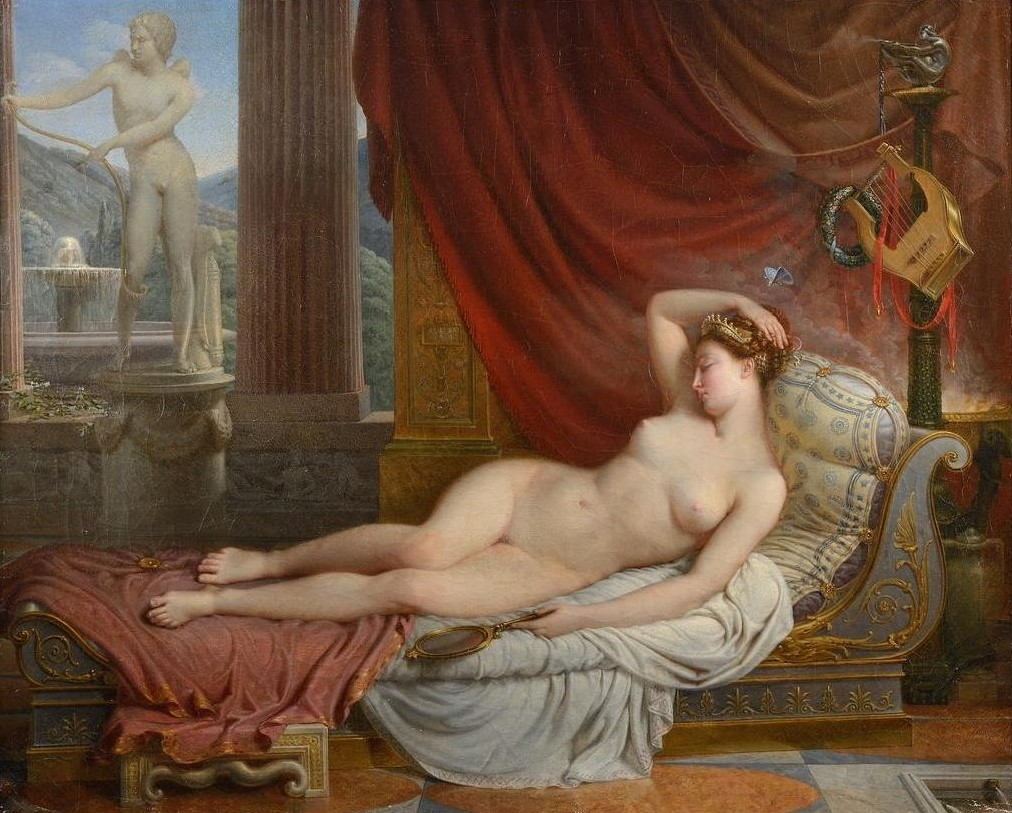
Sleeping Psyche by Louis-Julien-Jean Aulnette du Vautenet

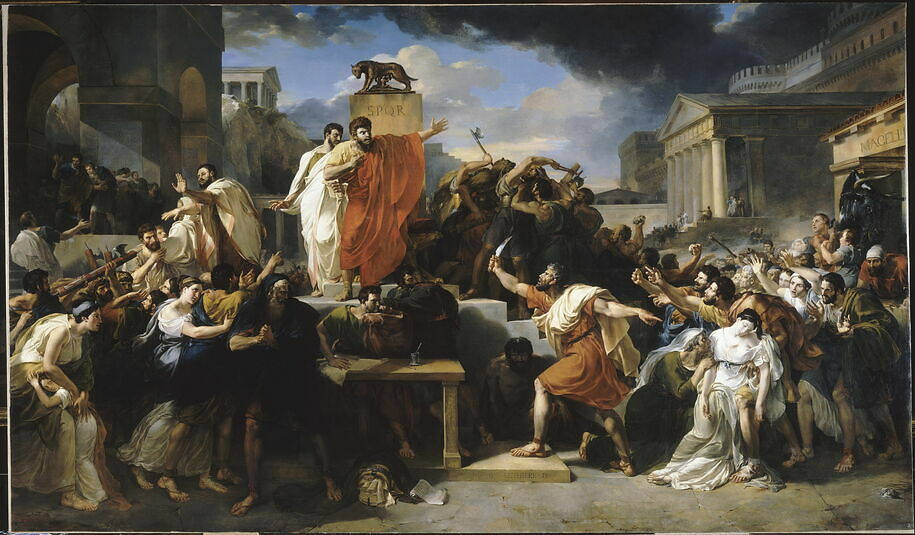
The Death of Virginia by Guillaume Guillon-Lethière

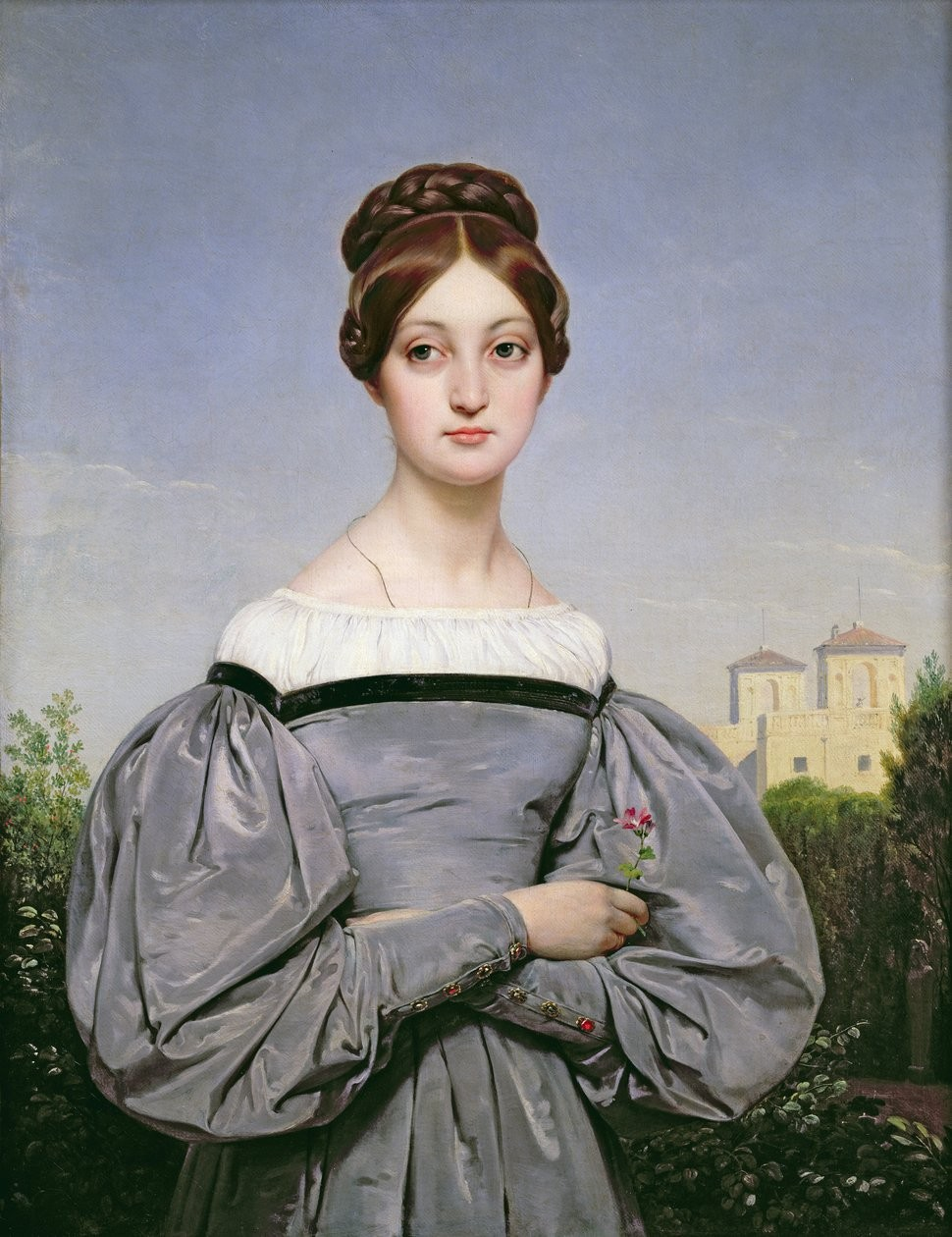
Portrait of Louise Vernet by Horace Vernet

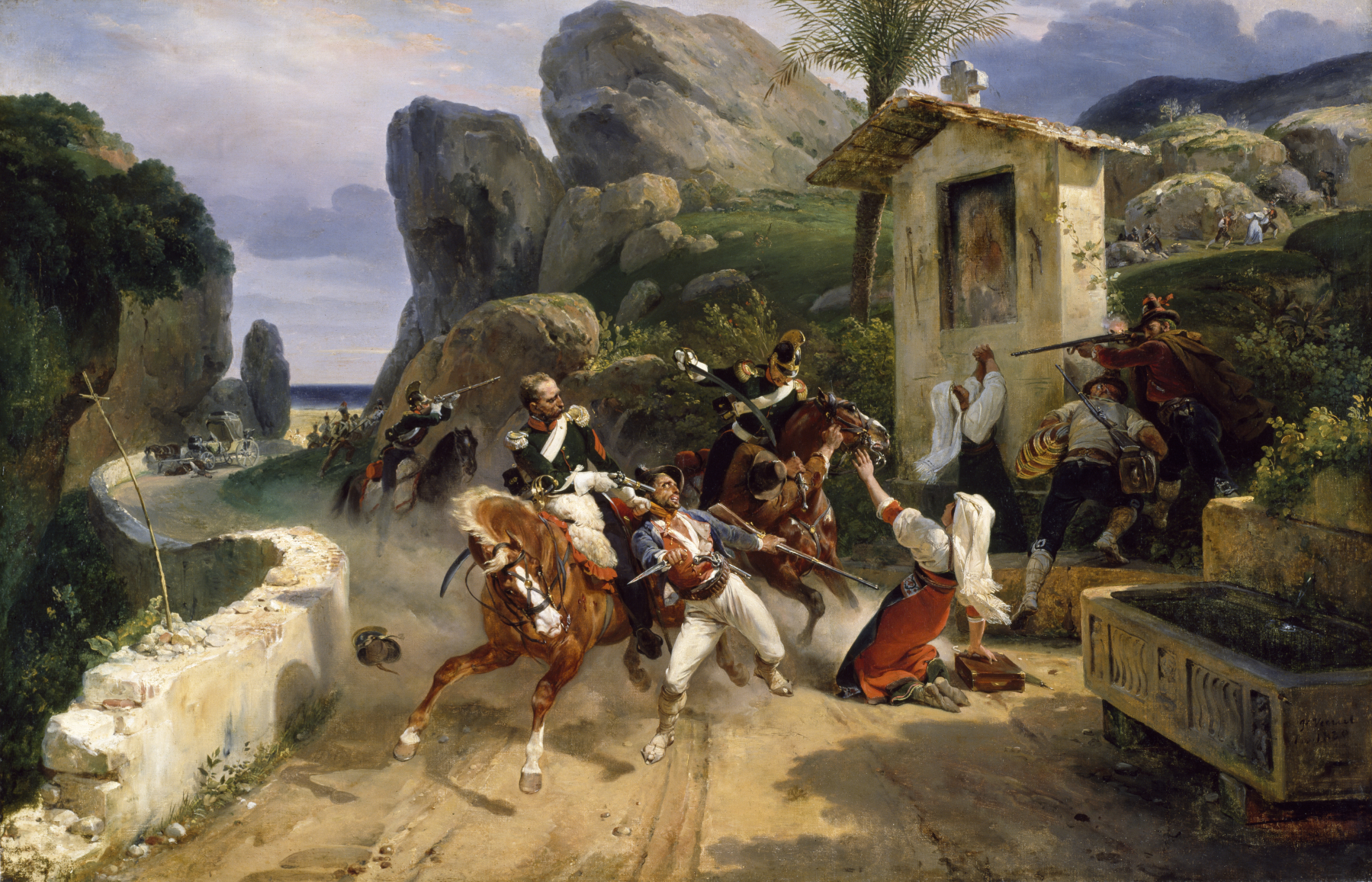
Italian Brigands Surprised by Papal Troops by Horace Vernet

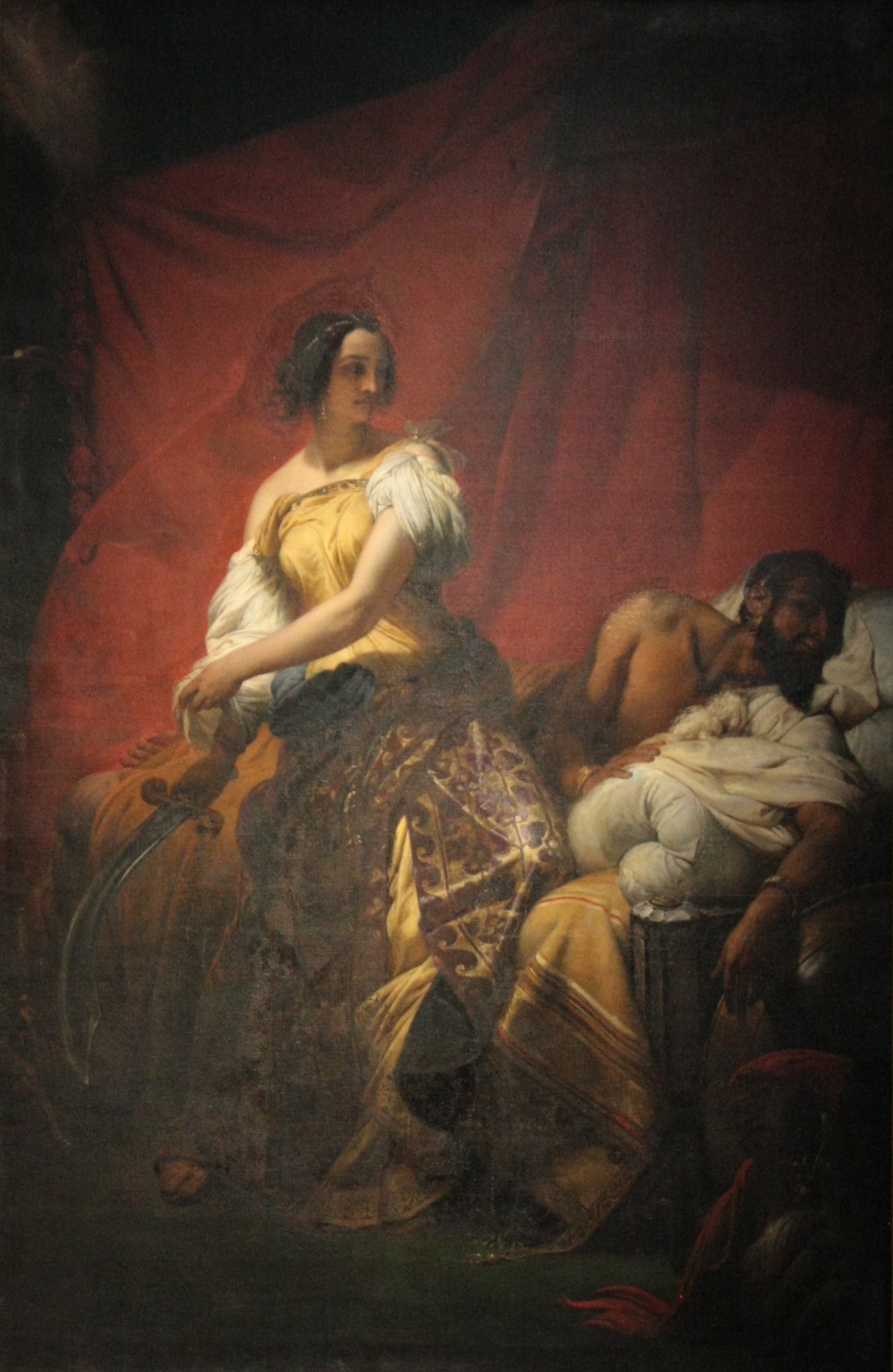
Judith and Holofernes by Horace Vernet

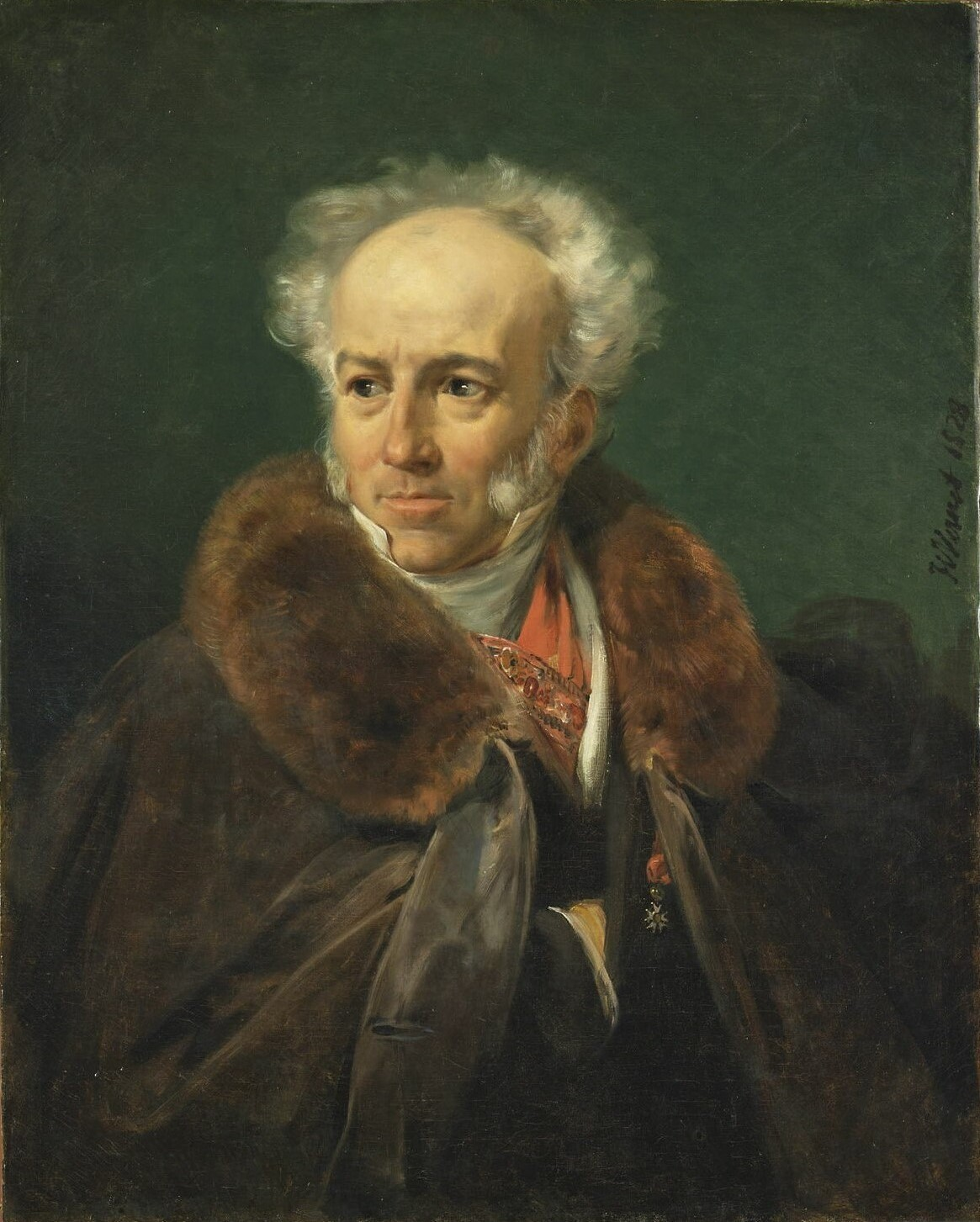
Portrait of Jean-Baptiste Isabey by Horace Vernet

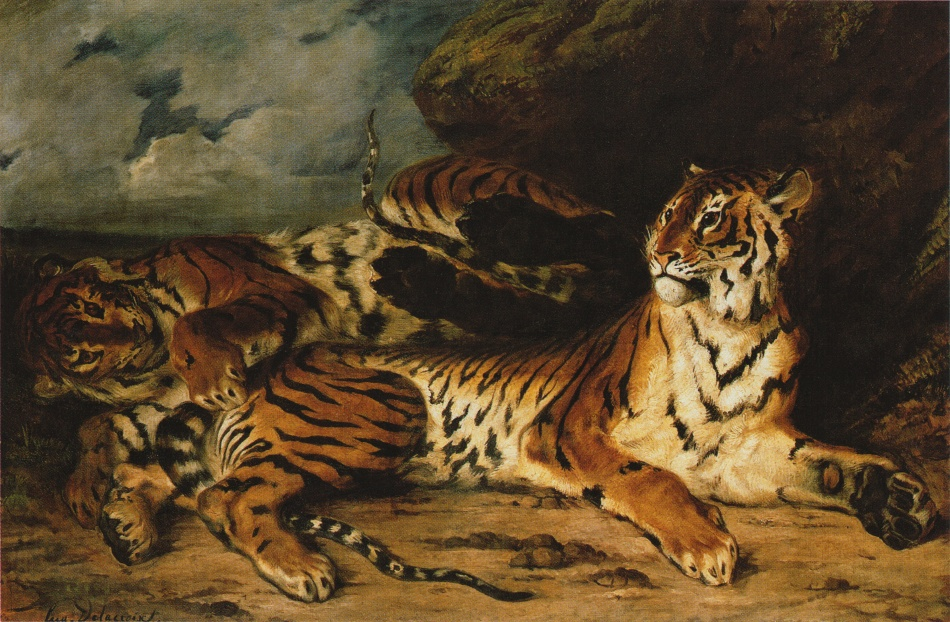
A Young Tiger Playing with Its Mother by Eugène Delacroix

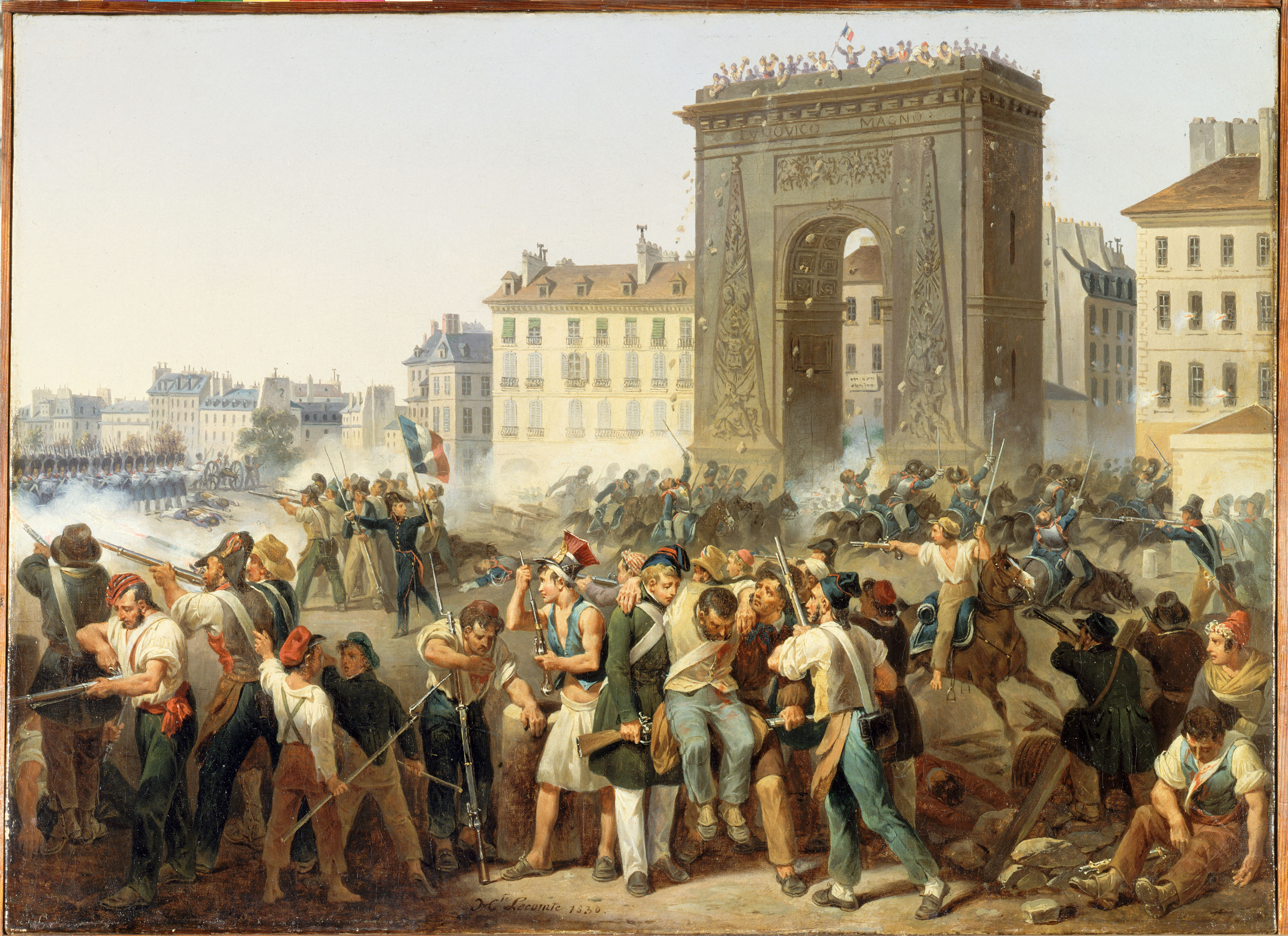
Battle of Porte Saint-Denis by Hippolyte Lecomte

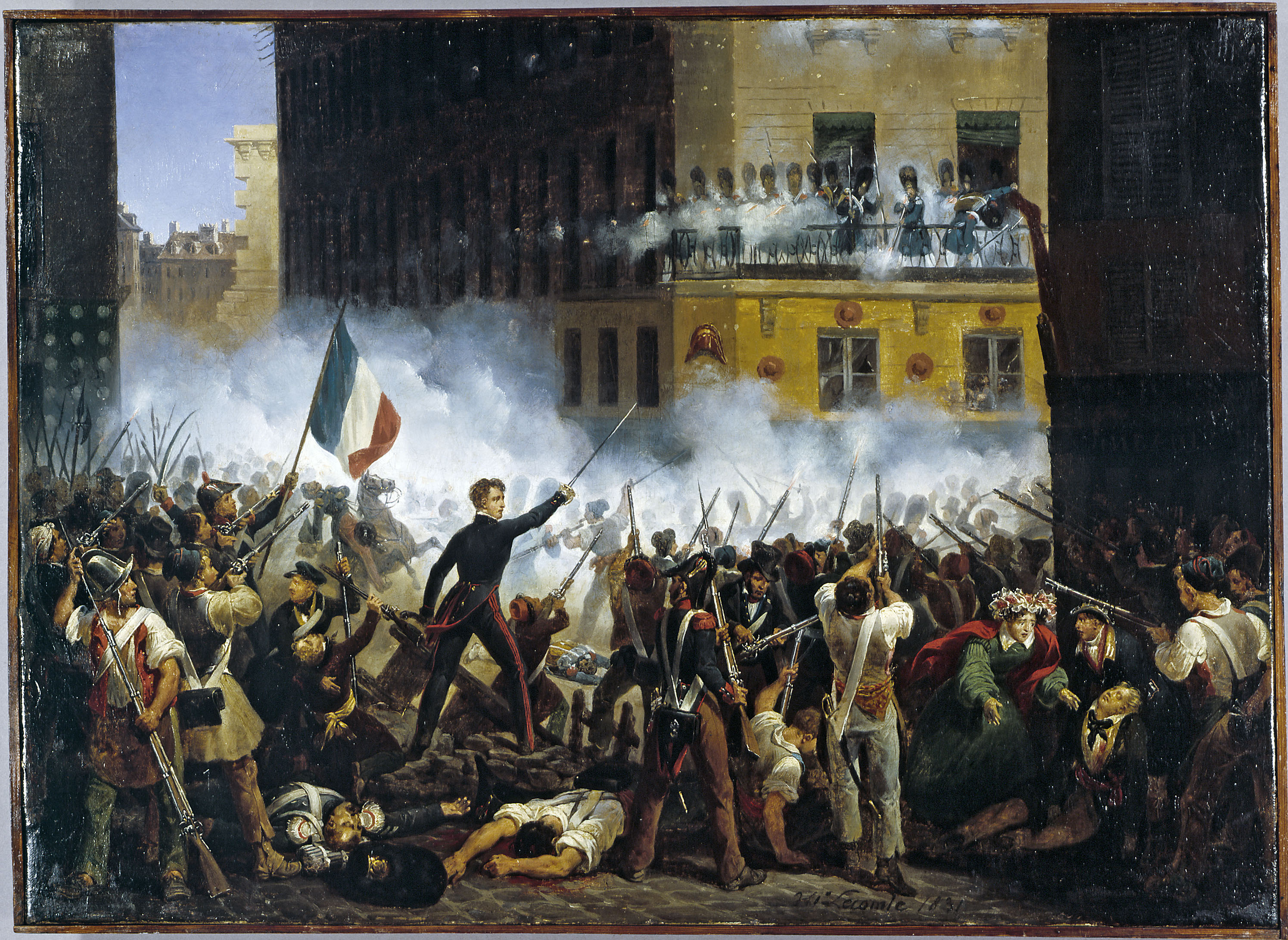
Combat de la rue de Rohan by Hippolyte Lecomte

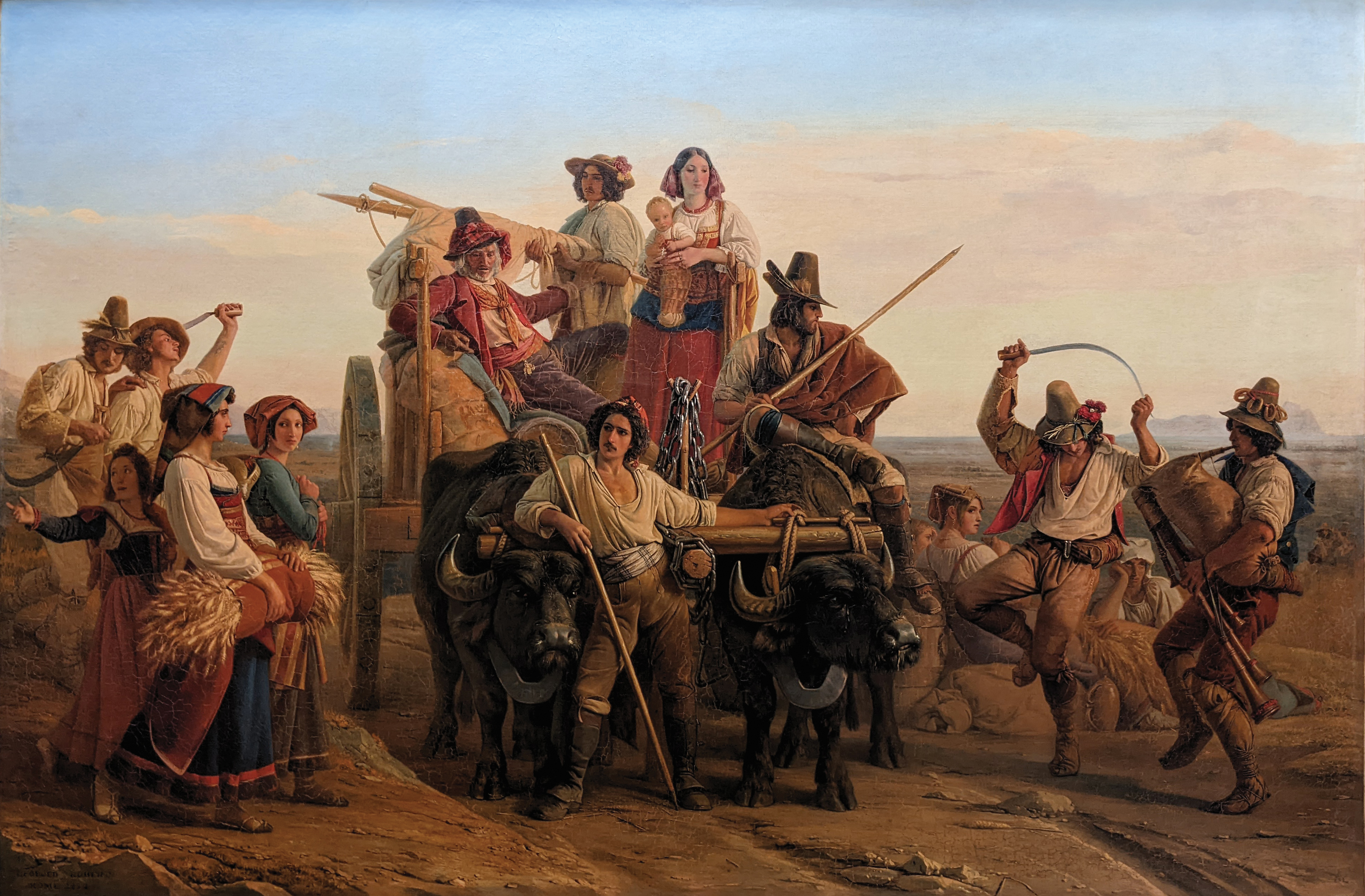
The Arrival of the Reapers in the Pontine Marshes by Louis Léopold Robert

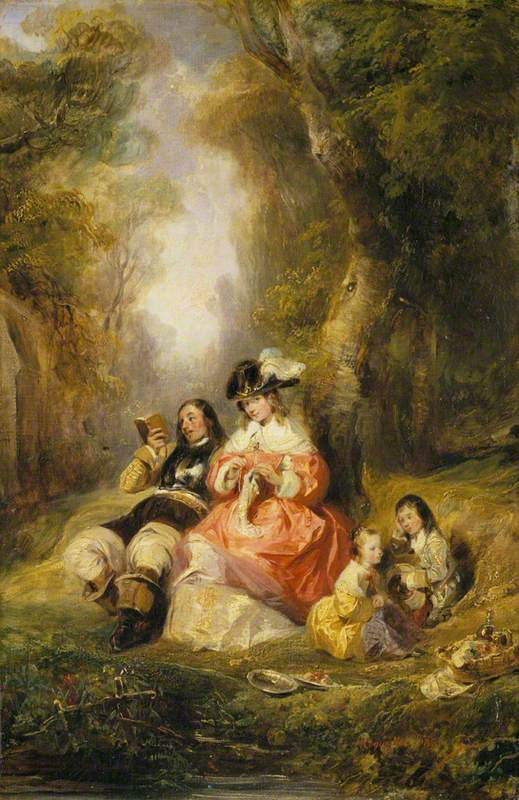
Summer Pleasures by Camille Roqueplan

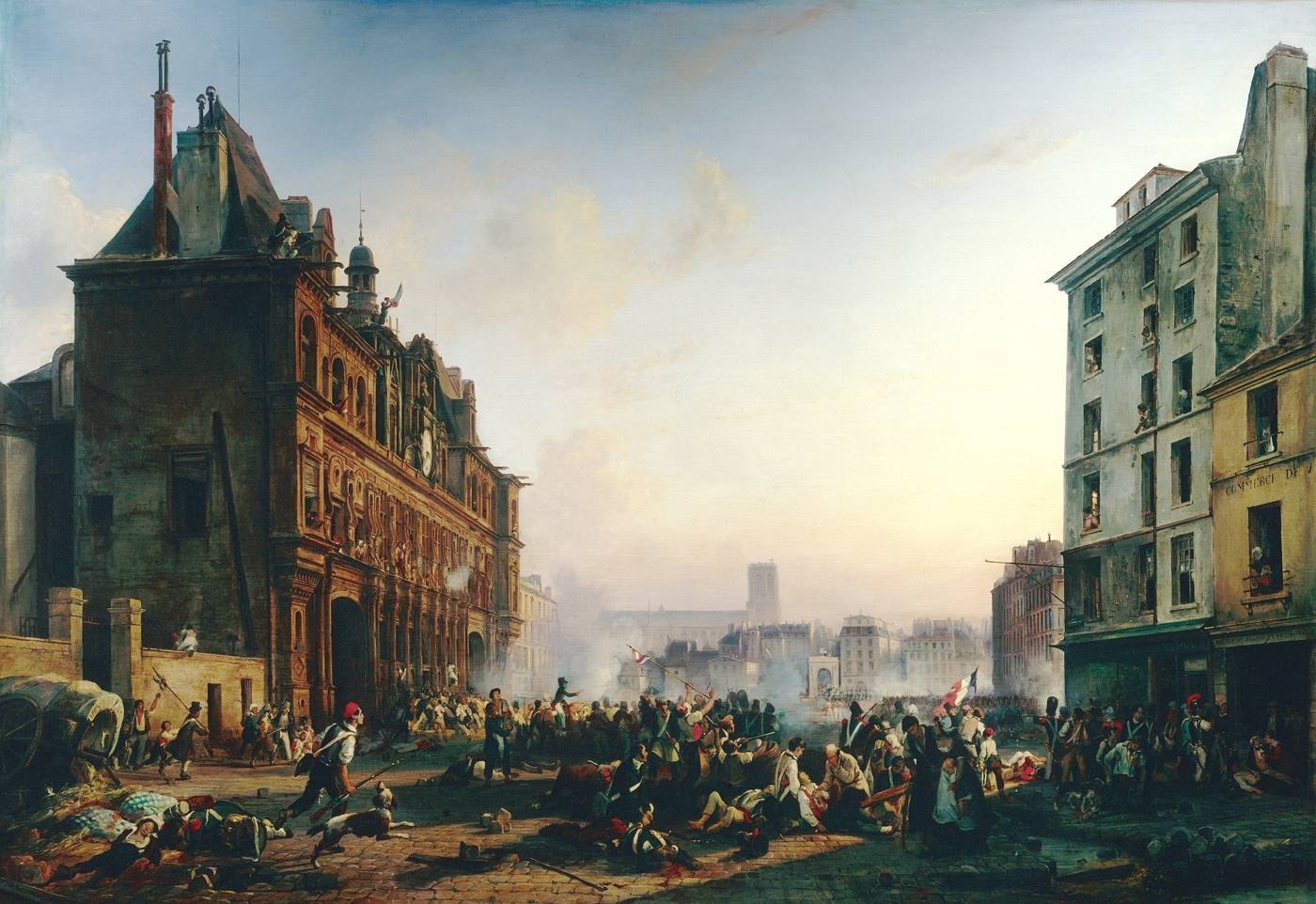
The Attack on the City Hall of Paris by Joseph Beaume

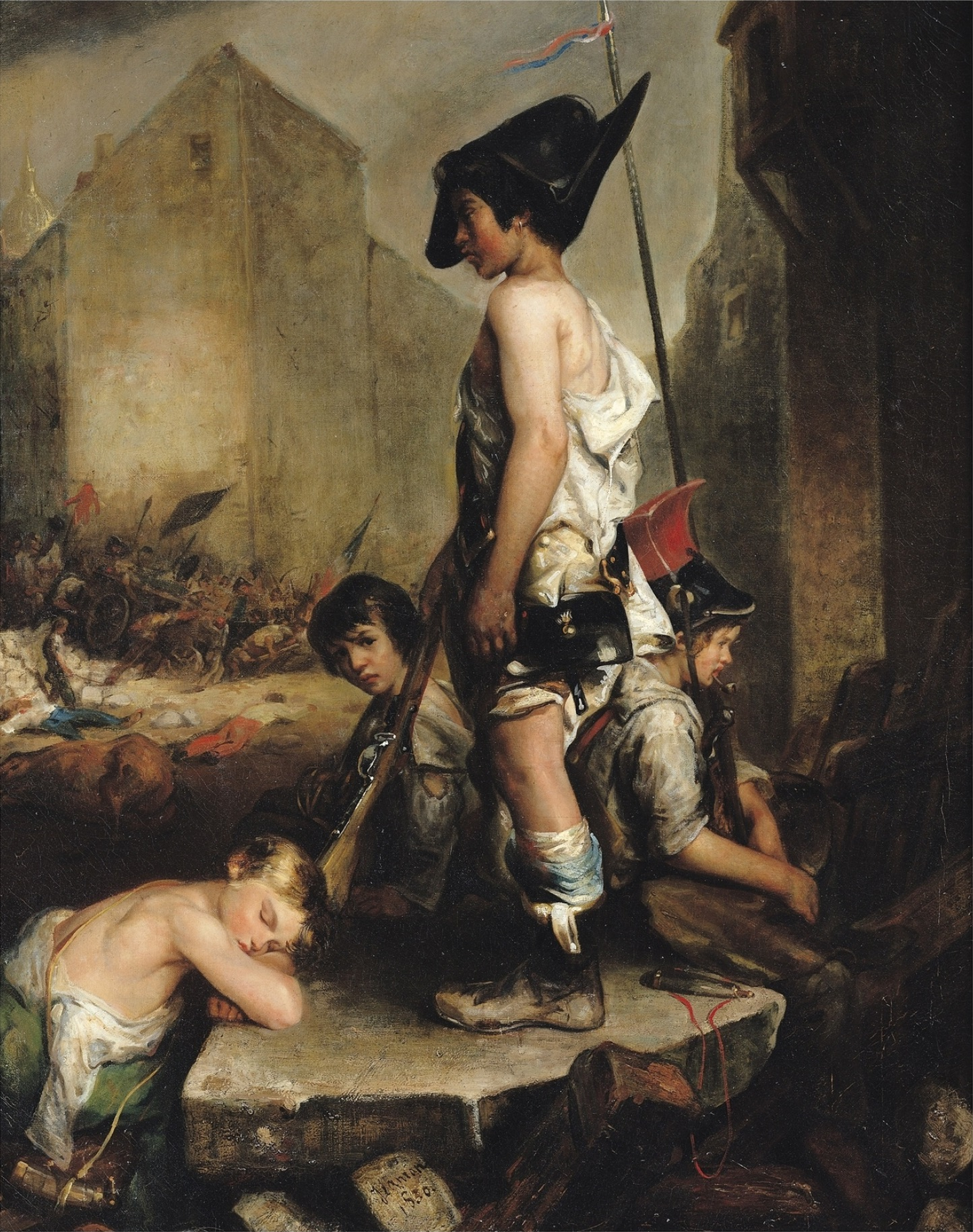
The Little Patriots by Philippe-Auguste Jeanron

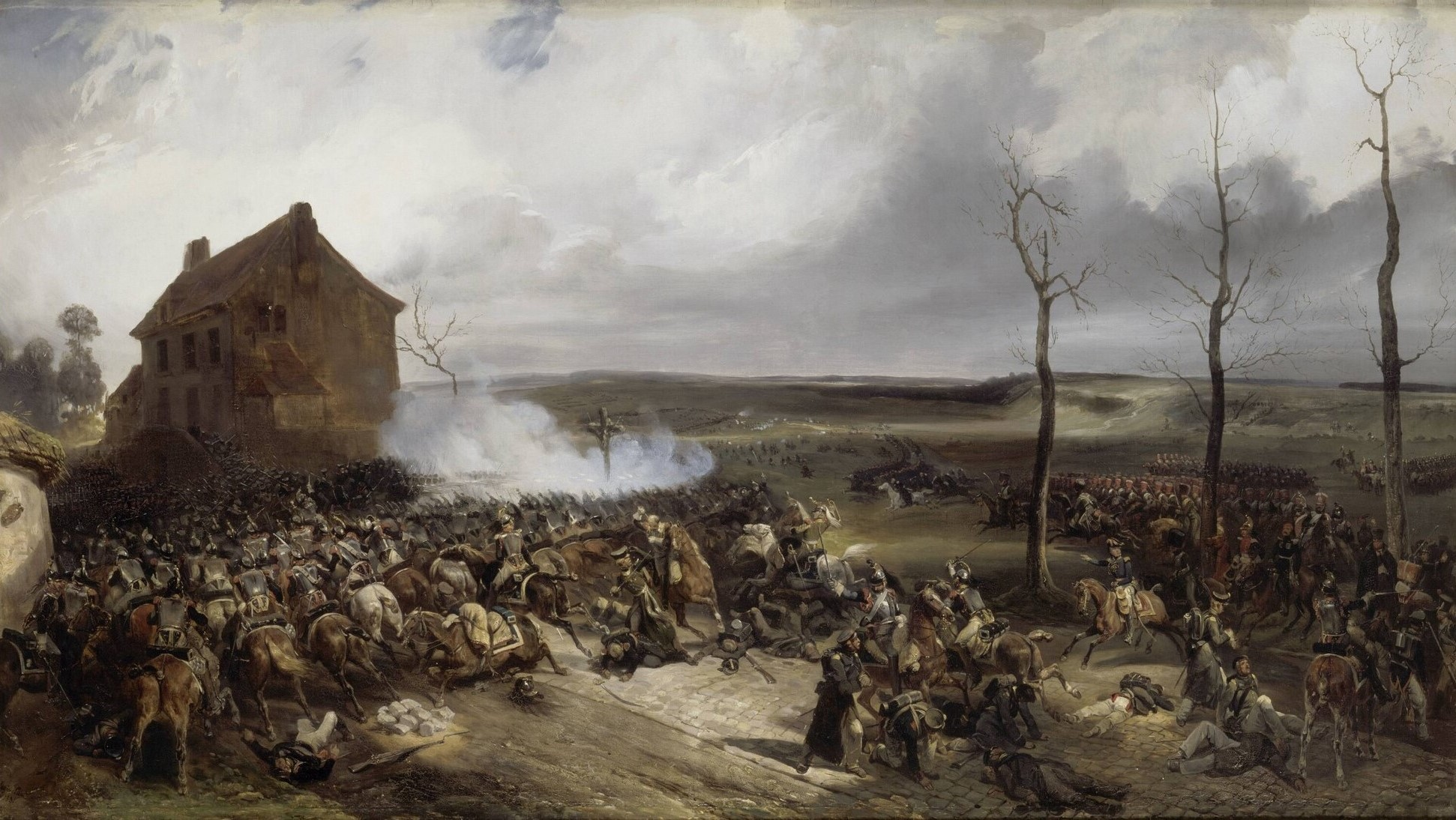
The Battle of Claye by Eugène Lami

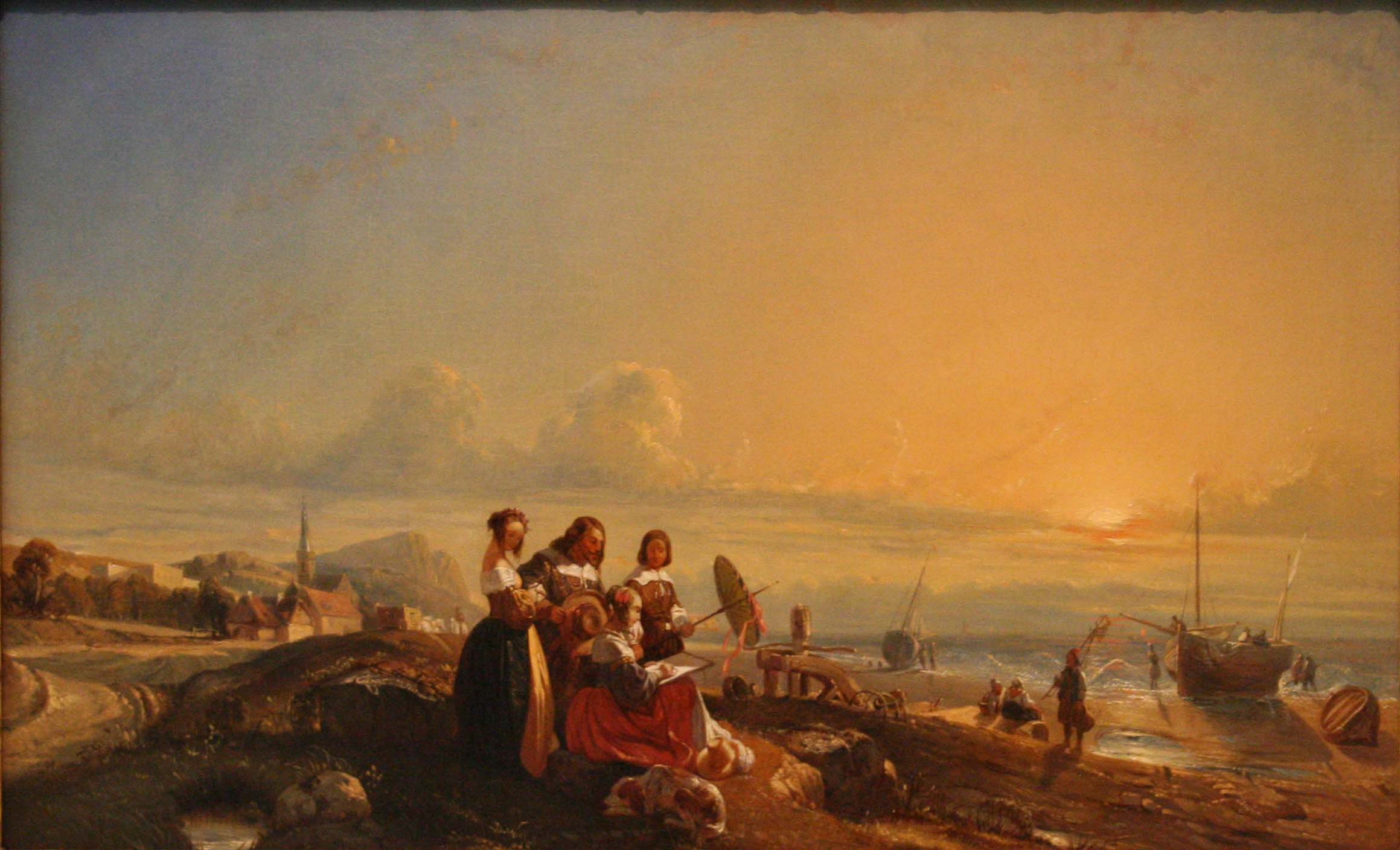
Coast Scene with Figures by Camille Roqueplan

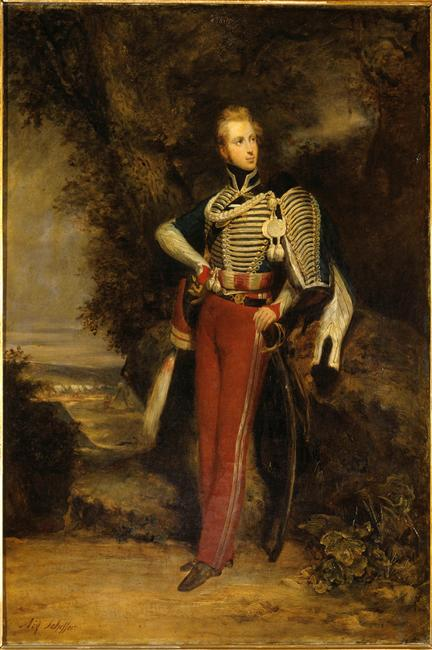
Portrait of the Duke of Orléans by Ary Scheffer

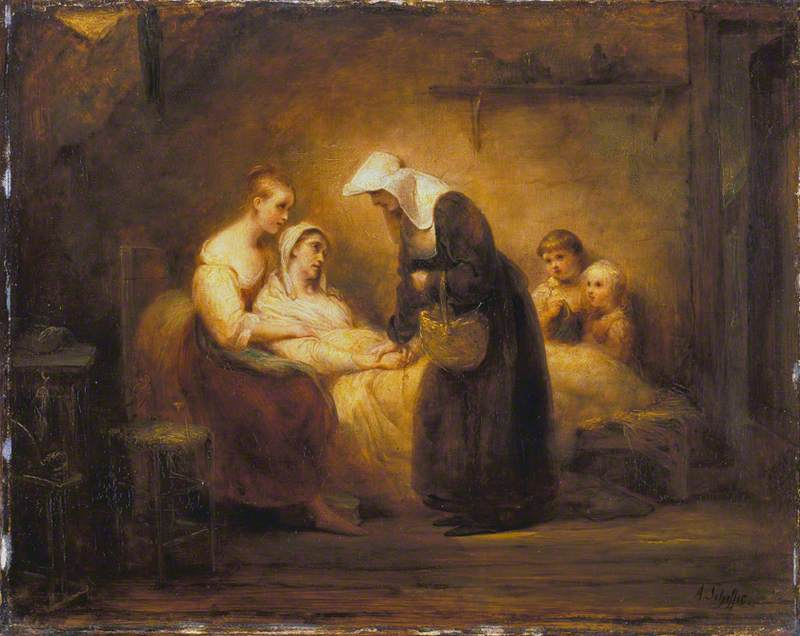
The Sister of Mercy by Ary Scheffer

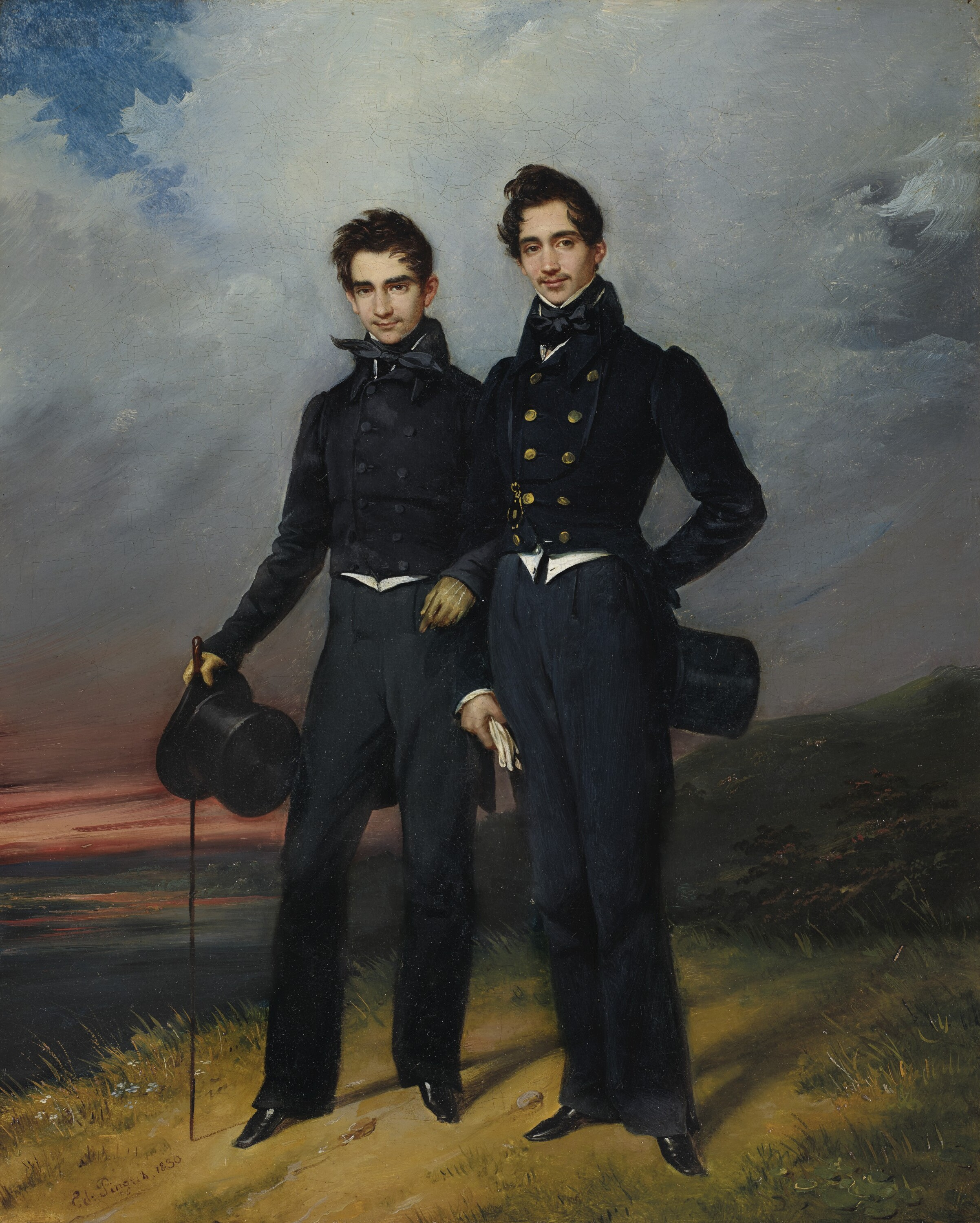
Portrait of Two Brothers by Edouard Pingret

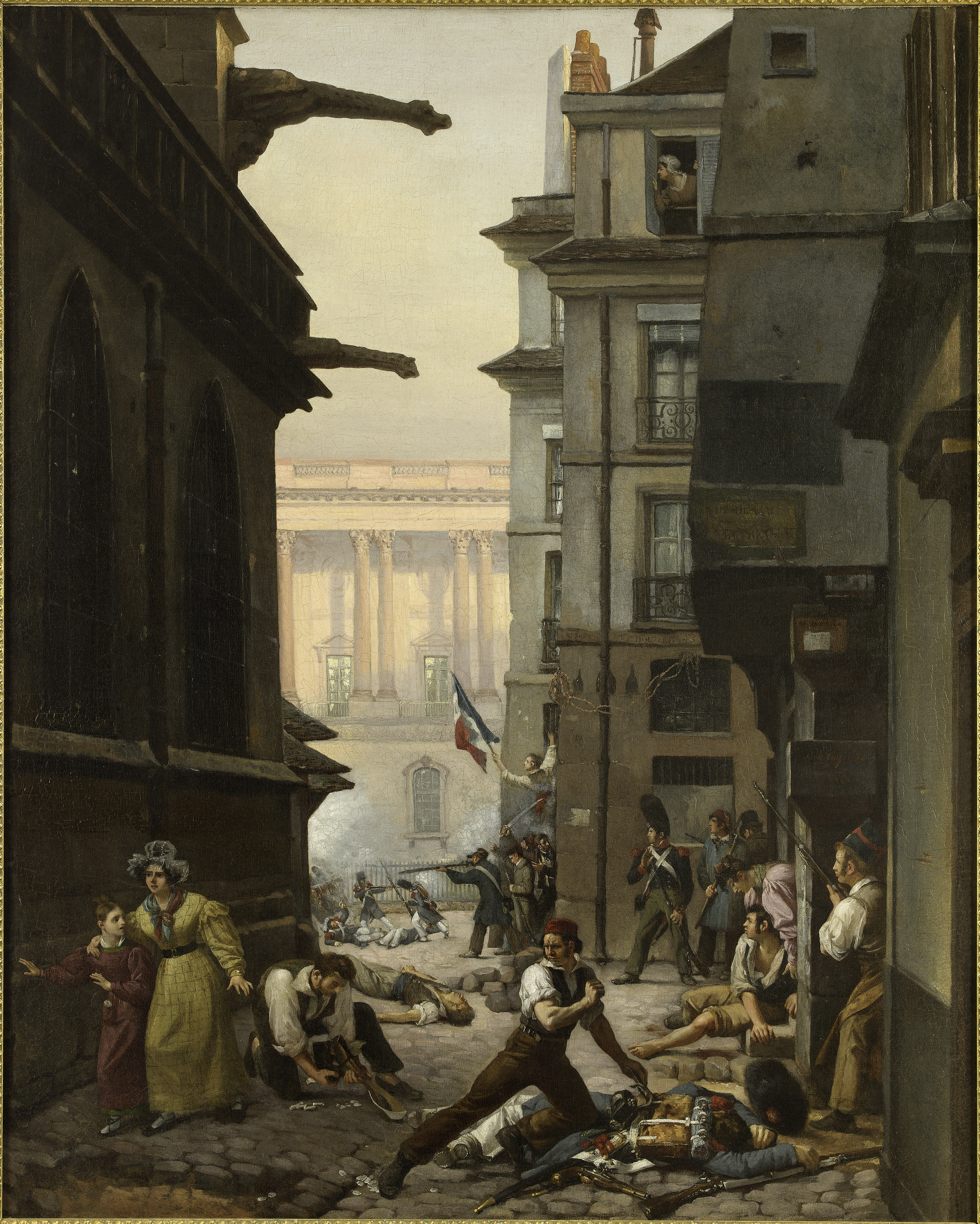
Scene on 29 July 1830 by Paul Claude-Michel Carpentier

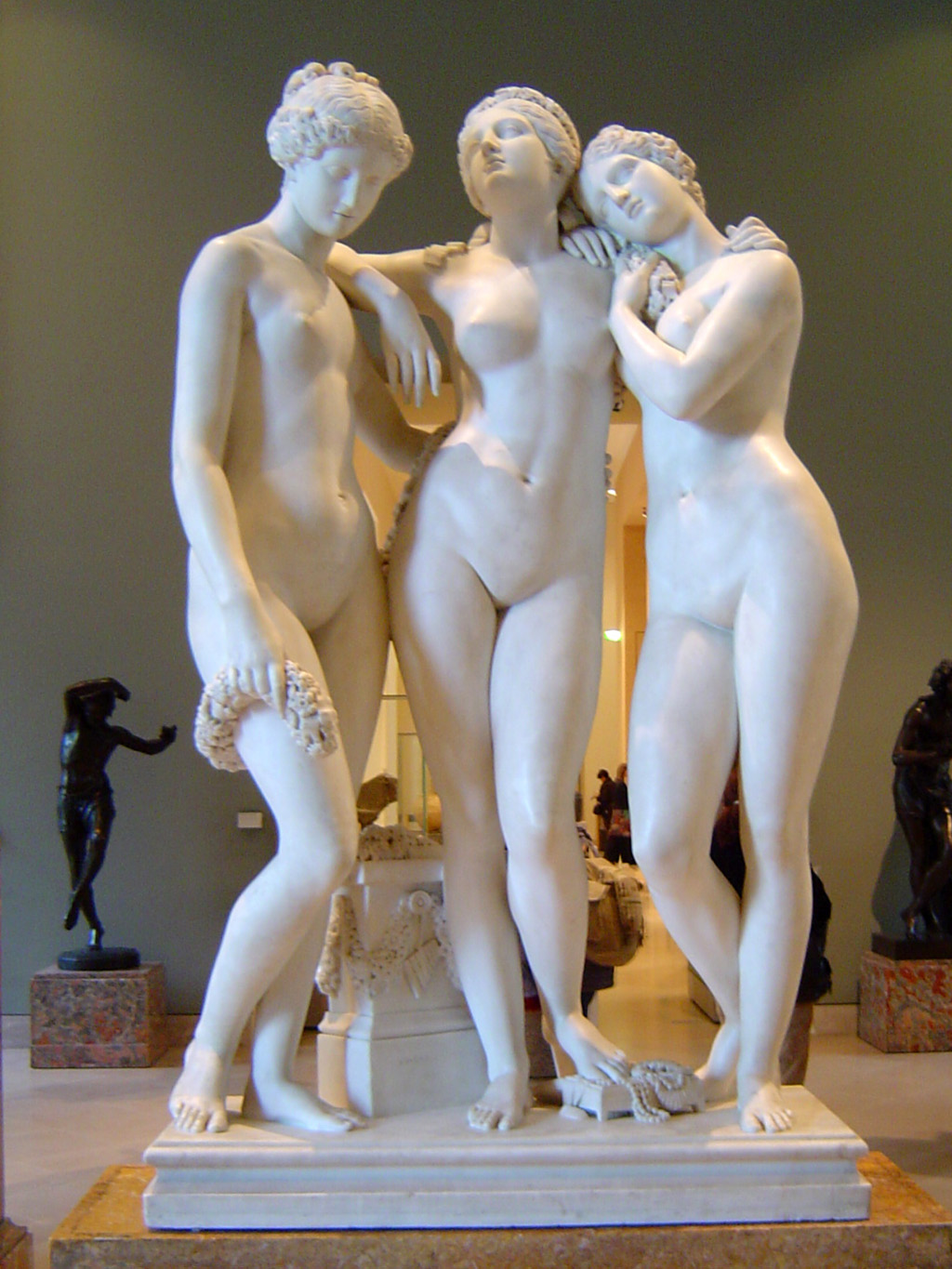
The Three Graces by James Pradier

== See also ==
- Royal Academy Exhibition of 1831, a contemporaneous art exhibition in London
- Category:Artworks exhibited at the Salon of 1831

== Bibliography ==
- Boime, Albert. Art in an Age of Counterrevolution, 1815-1848. University of Chicago Press, 2004.
- Harkett, Daniel & Hornstein, Katie (ed.) Horace Vernet and the Thresholds of Nineteenth-Century Visual Culture. Dartmouth College Press, 2017.
- James, Regina. Losing Our Heads: Beheadings in Literature and Culture. NYU Press, 2005.
- Noon, Patrick & Bann, Stephen. Constable to Delacroix: British Art and the French Romantics. Tate, 2003.
- Pomarède, Vincent, Trébosc, Delphine. 1001 Paintings of the Louvre: From Antiquity to the Nineteenth Century. 5 Continents, 2006.
- Ruutz-Rees, Janet Emily. Horace Vernet. Scribner and Welford, 1880.
