= Rebecca and Brian de Bois-Guilbert =

Painting by Léon Cogniet

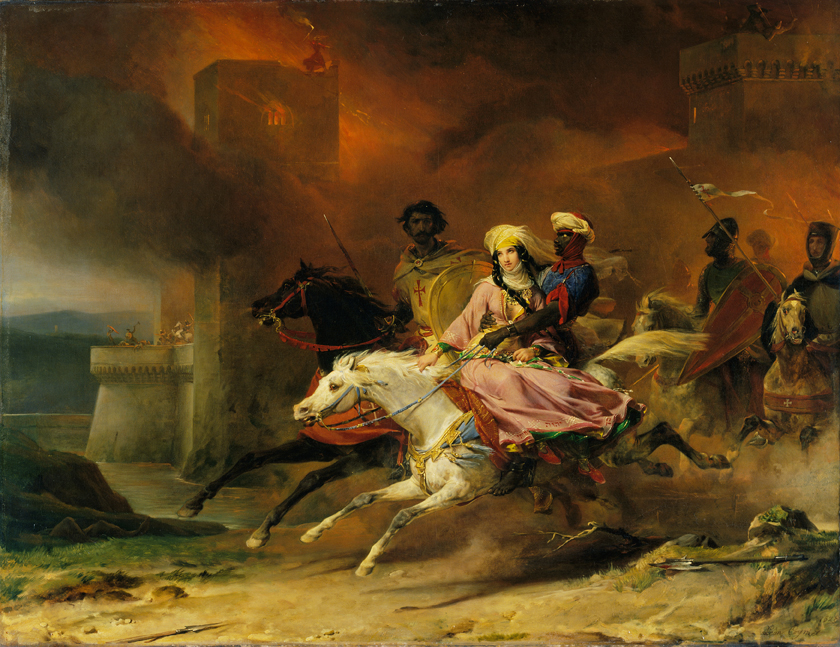
- Artist: Léon Cogniet
- Year: 1828
- Type: Oil on canvas
- Dimensions: 88.5 cm × 116 cm (34.8 in × 46 in)
- Location: Wallace Collection; London

Rebecca and Brian de Bois-Guilbert is an oil on canvas by the French artist Léon Cogniet, from 1828. It is now in the Wallace Collection, in London.

== History and description ==
The work depicts a scene from the novel Ivanhoe (1819), one of Walter Scott's Waverley Novels, that takes place in the late 12th-century, during the conflict between the Normans and the Saxons in England. Scott's stories were very popular in France during the Restoration period and a number of romantic painters drew on them for inspiration for their works. It also reflected the growing influence of Orientalism in art. It portrays the abduction of the Jewish Rebecca by a member of the Knights Templar, Brian de Bois-Guilbert, who was infatuated with her. He rides by her side, in a black horse, while she, beautifully dressed in pink, is carried away in a white horse, by his enslaved black Moor slave. In the background, the fictional Torquilstone Castle is seen in flames.

== Provenance ==
The painting was exhibited at the Salon of 1831 at the Louvre in Paris. Today it is in the Wallace Collection, in London, having been acquired by the Marquess of Hertford, in 1846. A smaller version, possibly also from 1828, is held at the Metropolitan Museum of Art, in New York.

== Bibliography ==
- Ingamells, John. The Wallace Collection: French nineteenth century. Trustees of the Wallace Collection, 1985.
- Riobó, Carlos. Caught between the Lines: Captives, Frontiers, and National Identity in Argentine Literature and Art. University of Nebraska Press, 2019.
- Tarling, Nicholas. Orientalism and the Operatic World. Rowman & Littlefield, 2015.
