= Cromwell with the Coffin of Charles I =

c. 1831 watercolor by Eugène Delacroix

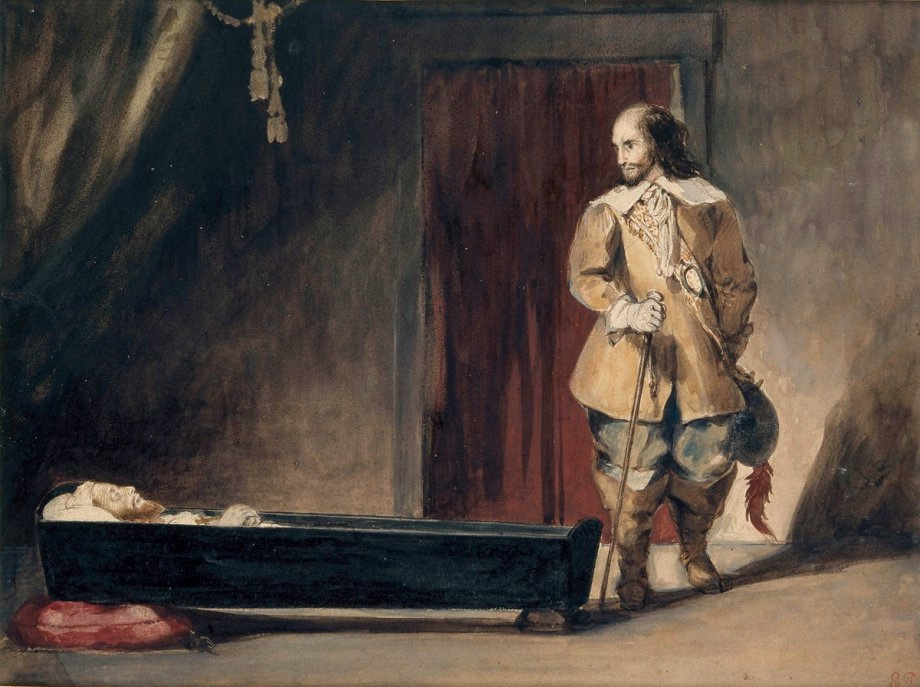
Cromwell with the Coffin of Charles I (c. 1831) by Eugène Delacroix

Cromwell with the Coffin of Charles I is a partially-varnished c. 1831 watercolour by the French painter Eugène Delacroix, now in the Département des Arts graphiques of the Louvre in Paris.

== Production ==
The work was painted as a reaction against Paul Delaroche's Cromwell and Charles I, exhibited at the 1831 Paris Salon, the first to be held after the July Revolution and Louis-Philippe I's seizure of power – Delacroix's own Liberty Leading the People had been exhibited at the same Salon. Both works are based on a fictional account by François-René de Chateaubriand of Oliver Cromwell opening Charles I's coffin after the latter's execution. Delaroche's work was less a portrayal of an event than an oblique comment on the French Revolution and Louis XVI's execution, with Cromwell standing in for Napoleon. Besides this nostalgia for France's Ancien Régime, Delaroche was attempting to find a middle way between Ingres' neoclassicism and Delacroix's romanticism.

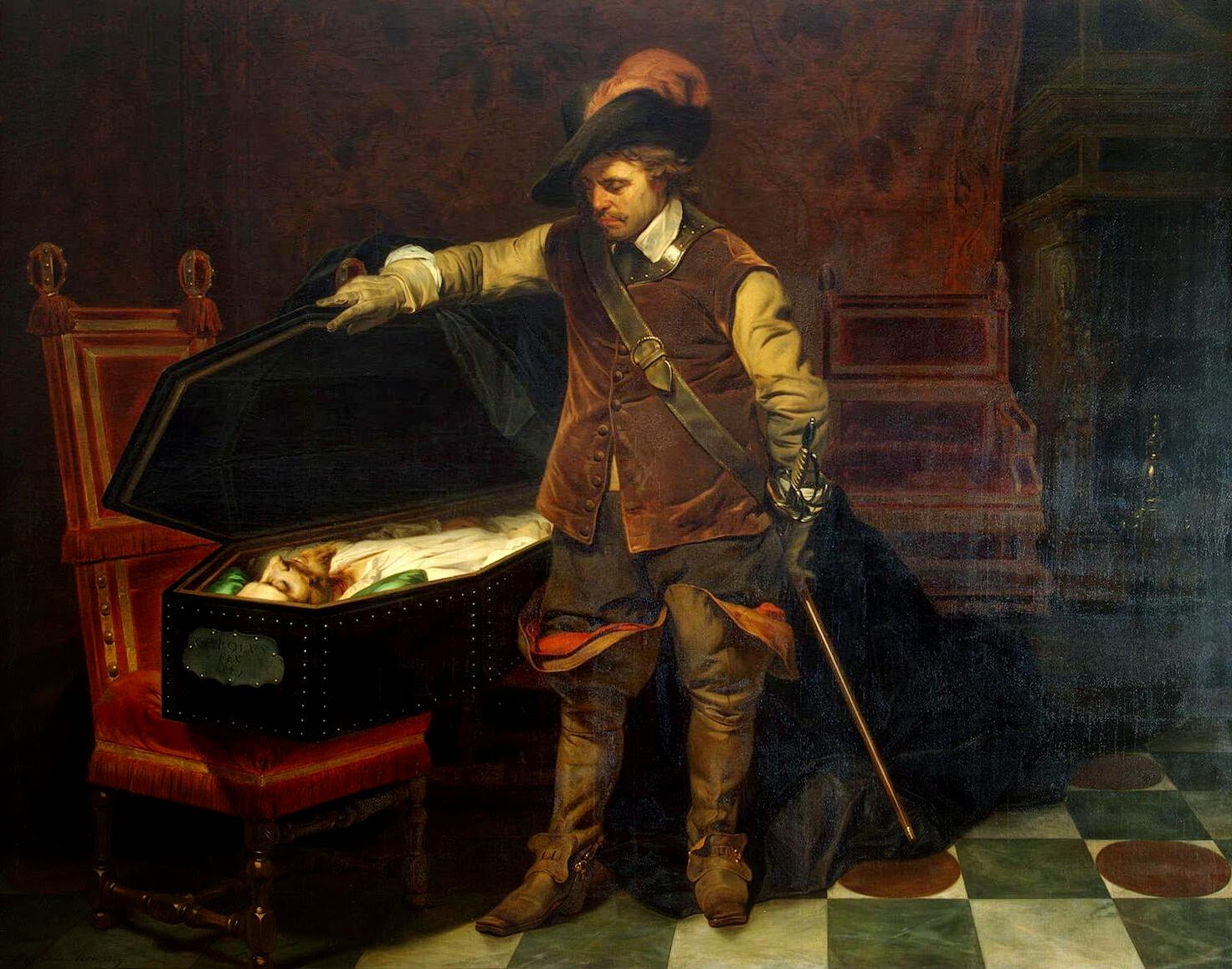
Delaroche's version of the scene

Delacroix was not alone in critiquing Delaroche's painting – Punch even published a parody of it in 1852 entitled Louis Napoléon Looking at the Corpse of Liberty According to a letter from Delacroix to his painter friend Paul Huet, Delacroix chose to produce the work in watercolour to express a radical opposition to Delaroche's approach. Delacroix's work imitated Delaroche's historical realism but as a small watercolour not a huge canvas. It also added Delacroix's own romanticism, which attempted to revive the past by evoking emotion. Unlike Delaroche, Delacroix preferred to imagine an evolving and troubled Cromwell on the edge of the scene not at its centre, finding the coffin by accident. It recalls the watercolour style of Delacroix's friend Richard Parkes Bonington, even down to the theatrical curtain above Charles' head.

Delaroche ignored the criticism of his work and showed Cromwell again in his Charles I Insulted by Cromwell's Soldiers in 1836, which was so strongly savaged by the critics that Delaroche never exhibited at the Paris Salon again and barely exhibited outside it either. Delacroix's work was acquired in December 1942 from Raphaël Gérard for 8,750 ℛ︁ℳ︁ (175,000 francs) for the Museum Folkwang in Essen, but was returned to the Louvre in 1948 as part of the first consignment of looted art to leave Düsseldorf. After its return to France it was assigned to the Louvre.

== Bibliography ==
- (in French) L’Invention du Passé. Histoires de cœur et d’épée en Europe 1802-1850, t. 2, Paris, Musée des Beaux-Arts de Lyon; Hazan, 2014, 320 p. (ISBN 978-2-7541-0760-0, notice BnF no FRBNF43829187).
- Michael J. Braddick, The Oxford Handbook of the English Revolution, OUP Oxford, 2015, 640 p., (ISBN 978-0-19166-726-8).
- (in French) Alain Daguerre de Hureaux, Delacroix, Paris, Hazan, 1993, 365 p. (ISBN 978-2-85025-324-9).
- (in French) Barthélémy Jobert, Delacroix, Paris, Gallimard, coll. « Monographie », 1997, 335 p. (ISBN 978-2-07011-516-7, notice BnF no FRBNF36190301).
- Mary Lathers, Encyclopedia of the Romantic Era, 1760-1850, Christopher John Murray éd., New York, Routledge, 2013, 1336 p., (ISBN 978-1-13545-579-8).
- Martin Meisel, Realizations : Narrative, Pictorial, and Theatrical Arts in Nineteenth-Century England, Princeton, Princeton University Press, 2014, 492 p., (ISBN 978-1-40085-609-1).
- Susanne Zantop, Paintings on the move, Lincoln, University of Nebraska Press, 1989, 194 p., (ISBN 978-0-80324-909-7).
- Stephen Bann, Paul Delaroche : History Painted, Princeton, Princeton University Press, 1997, 304 p. (ISBN 978-0-69101-745-7).
- (in French) Alfred Robaut; Fernand Calmettes; Ernest Chesneau, L’Œuvre complet de Eugène Delacroix,... peintures, dessins, gravures, lithographies, catalogué et reproduit par Alfred Robaut, commenté par Ernest Chesneau, ouvrage publié avec la collaboration de Fernand Calmettes, Paris, Charavay frères, 1885.
