= Saint Amelia, Queen of Hungary =

Painting by Paul Delaroche

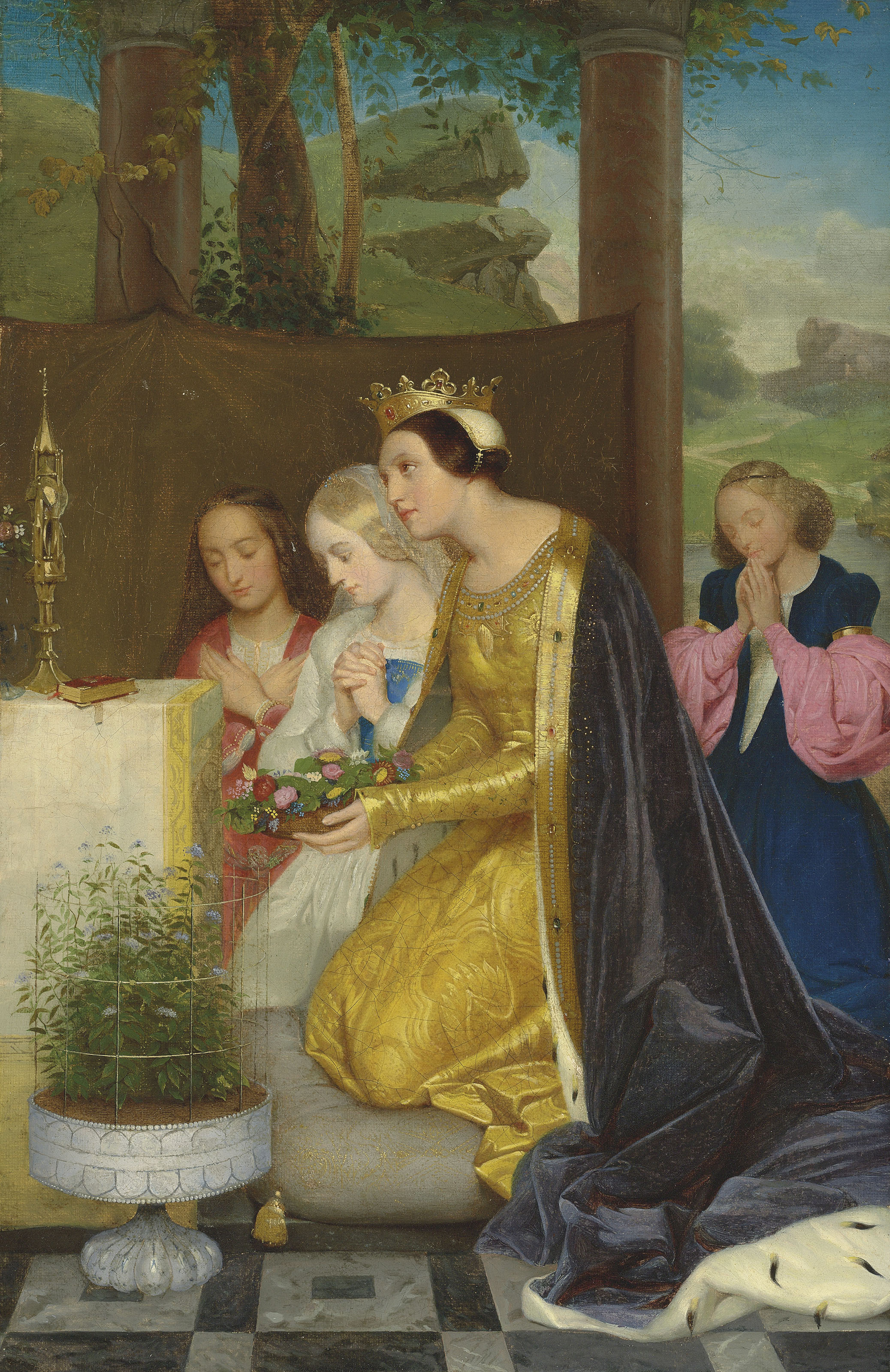
- Artist: Paul Delaroche
- Year: 1831-1834
- Medium: Oil on canvas
- Dimensions: 44 cm × 29 cm (17 in × 11 in)
- Location: Private collection

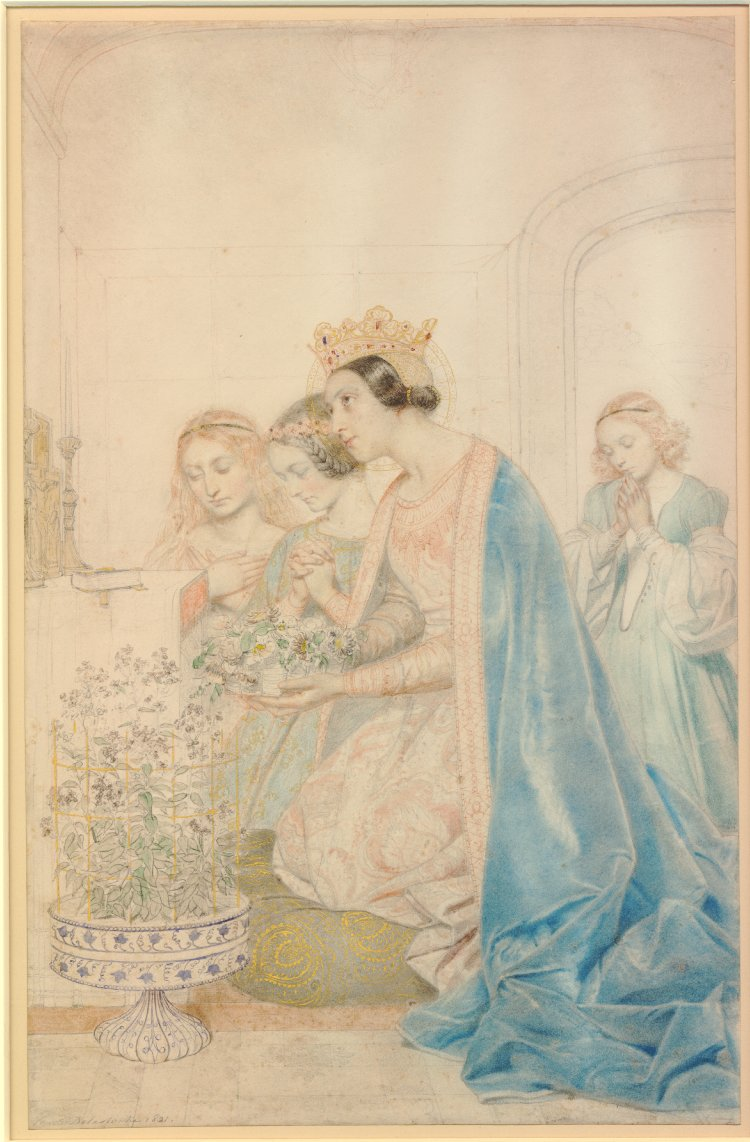
Preparatory study by Delaroche

Saint Amelia, Queen of Hungary is an oil painting by Paul Delaroche, from 1831 to 1834. It was investigated in 2016 by the BBC TV programme Fake or Fortune?, and is held in a private collection.

== Lost work ==
A painting of Saint Amelia by French history painter Paul Delaroche was commissioned to the artist in 1831 either by the last king of France, Louis Philippe I, for his wife Queen Marie-Amélie, or by the queen herself. The work was exhibited at the Salon of 1834 in Paris. In 1837, the painting was recorded as being hung in the Royal Chapel at the Tuileries Palace in Paris, and it was copied in an engraving by Paolo Mercuri. It was also reproduced as the main panel in a stained glass window for the Queen's private chapel at the Château d'Eu. A preparatory drawing in chalk, graphite and watercolour is held by the British Museum. The original painting had been believed to be lost.

== Fake or Fortune? ==
The Fake or Fortune? team investigated a version of the painting, housed at Castle of Park in Cornhill, Aberdeenshire, to determine whether it was the Delaroche original or one of a number of copies. This unsigned work was bought in 1989, for about £500, by the late Neil Wilson, an art dealer who had worked for Christie's after leaving university. The painting's provenance was very poor. In the programme, art expert Bendor Grosvenor revealed an 1866 watercolour by Joseph Nash depicting the painting in the Queen's bedroom at Claremont House in Surrey, where the deposed King and Queen lived after fleeing France following the Revolution of 1848. Following Maria Amalia's death in 1866, records in the Bibliothèque nationale de France proved that the painting passed to her fourth child, Prince Louis, Duke of Nemours, who owned Bushy House in London until his death in 1896, but no records were found that proved where the painting passed after 1896. The next sighting of the painting was when it was sold at Christie's in 1980 as a work by the French artist Fleury François Richard, with the title 'A Queen and her Retinue at Worship'.

Technical analysis showed that colour anomalies in the painting were the result of pigment degradation, and that parts of the painting had also been restored. After reviewing the show's findings, Professor Stephen Bann, a leading Delaroche expert, concluded that it was the lost original. He also revealed a letter written by Delaroche, in which he registers his dismay at the state of the picture after it had been copied to create a stained glass window for Queen Marie-Amélie, and says that he will have to do considerable work to restore it.

Following its authentication, Wilson's widow, Becky, was reported to have decided to keep the painting, but allow it to be displayed at the British Museum in London when a Delaroche exhibition takes place. Subsequently, the painting was sold via Christie's in July 2019 for £33,750.

== Subject ==
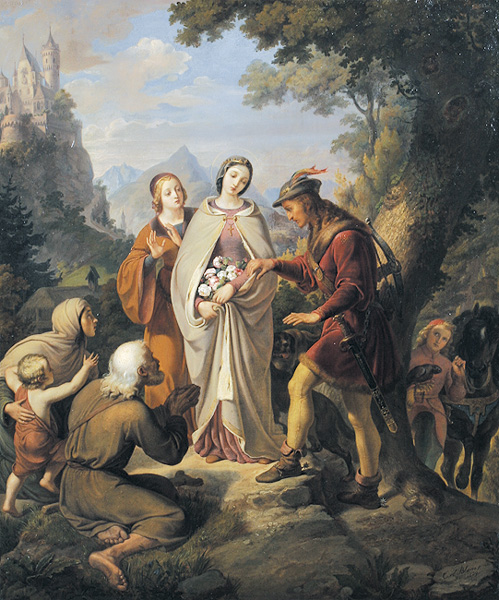
Saint Elizabeth of Hungary and the Miracle of the Roses

Maria Amalia and her paternal grandmother Maria Amalia of Saxony, Queen Consort of Spain, celebrated their feast day on July 13. Also Maria Amalia is depicted as this saint in the stained-glass of the Église Notre-Dame-de-Compassion de Paris, with the drawing originally made by Ingres. He tried to find out who she was, but with no luck.

There is no Amelia in the list of Hungarian Queens. The only Hungarian royal "saint" with the title of Queen is Gisela of Bavaria, wife of Saint Stephen I of Hungary himself, but her canonization in the 18th century failed. She was beatified only in 1975.

However, there is a Hungarian royal saint named Elizabeth of Hungary, Landgravine Consort of Thuringia (1207 - 1231), who is associated with an event known as the Miracle of the Roses, which is also told of her great-niece and fellow saint Elizabeth of Aragon, Queen Consort of Portugal. This may connect with the floral imagery of the painting.

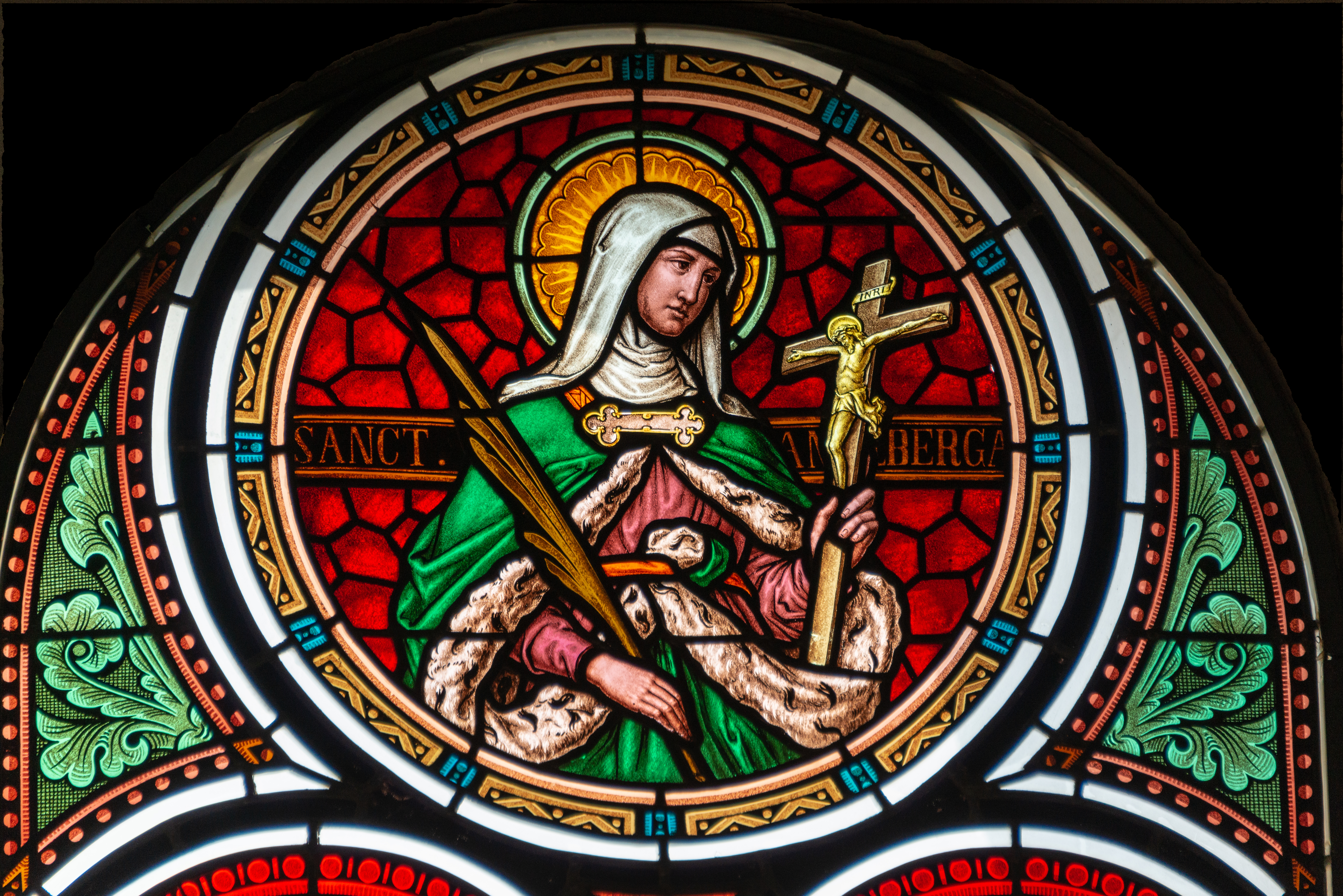
Saint Amalberga of Maubeuge is also known as Saint Amalia, but her supposed husband Witger was associated with Lorraine. She herself also lived two centuries before the Magyar migration into Pannonia.

There are three Saint named Amelia or a variant thereof. Two noblewomen with the same name were also relatives of the later Carolingian dynasty: Amalberga of Maubeuge and Amalberga of Temse, and they are both official saints recognized by the Roman Catholic Church. There is also a non-noble Amelberga of Susteren.

There is also Amalaberga, niece of Theodoric the Great, who married Hermanafrid, King of Thuringia, whoever this Thuringian connection with Elizabeth of Hungary is questionable at best.
