= Strafford Led to Execution =

Painting by Paul Delaroche

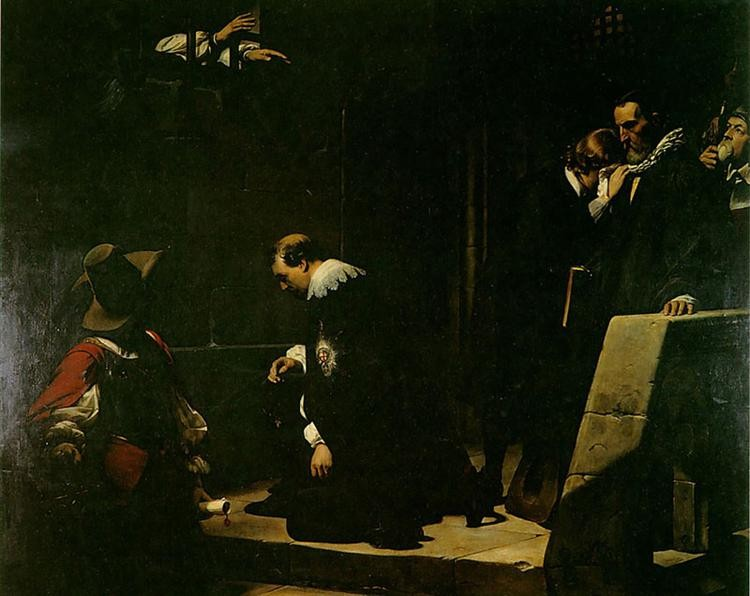
- Artist: Paul Delaroche
- Year: 1835
- Type: oil on canvas, history painting
- Dimensions: 284 cm × 392 cm (112 in × 154 in)
- Location: Private Collection

Strafford Led to Execution is an 1835 history painting by the French artist Paul Delaroche. It reimagines the scene in the Tower of London on 12 May 1641 when Thomas Wentworth, 1st Earl of Strafford, the former Chief minister to Charles I was about to be executed.

Under enormous pressure from his opponents in the English Parliament, the King reluctantly signed his death warrant. Strafford is shown pausing to receive a blessing from William Laud, the Archbishop of Canterbury who had also been imprisoned there. His hands can be shown reaching through the bars of the neighbouring cell. Strafford was taken to Tower Hill and beheaded in front of a large crowd. Laud himself was executed in 1645 following a trial.

Delaroche was a leading painter of the Romantic movement who produced a number of scenes from British history, including three related to the Civil War era. The painting was displayed at the Salon of 1837 at the Louvre in Paris.

It was acquired by the aristocratic art collector Duke of Sutherland, whose brother Lord Francis Egerton bought another notable work by Delaroche Charles I Insulted by Cromwell's Soldiers. A mezzotint based on the painting was produced by the engraver George Sidwell Sanders.

== Bibliography ==
- Bann, Stephen. Paul Delaroche: History Painted. Reaktion Books, 1997.
- Strong, Roy. Painting the Past: The Victorian Painter and British History. Pimlico, 2004.
