= Saint Cecilia and the Angels =

Painting by Paul Delaroche

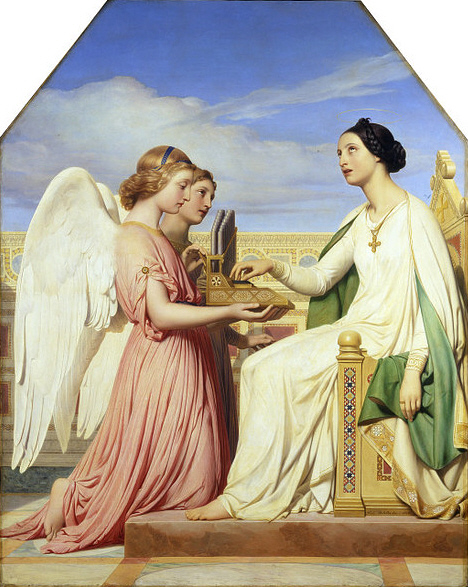
- Artist: Paul Delaroche
- Year: 1836
- Type: Oil on canvas, religious painting
- Dimensions: 205.7 cm × 162.5 cm (81.0 in × 64.0 in)
- Location: Victoria and Albert Museum, London

Saint Cecilia and the Angels is an oil on canvas religious painting by the French artist Paul Delaroche, from 1836. It depicts Saint Cecilia, the Christian Roman martyr and patron saint of music, accompanied by two angels.

The painting was displayed at the Salon of 1837 at the Louvre, in Paris, alongside Delaroche's Lord Strafford Going to his Execution. This was the last time Delaroche exhibited works at the Salon.

Today the work is in the Victoria and Albert Museum, in London, having been gifted to the gallery in 1903.

== Bibliography ==
- Bann, Stephen. Paul Delaroche: History Painted. Reaktion Books, 1997.
- Reymert, Martin L.H. Ingres & Delacroix Through Degas & Puvis de Chavannes: The Figure in French Art, 1800-1870. The Gallery, 1975.
