= The Assassination of the Duke of Guise (Delaroche) =

Painting by Paul Delaroche

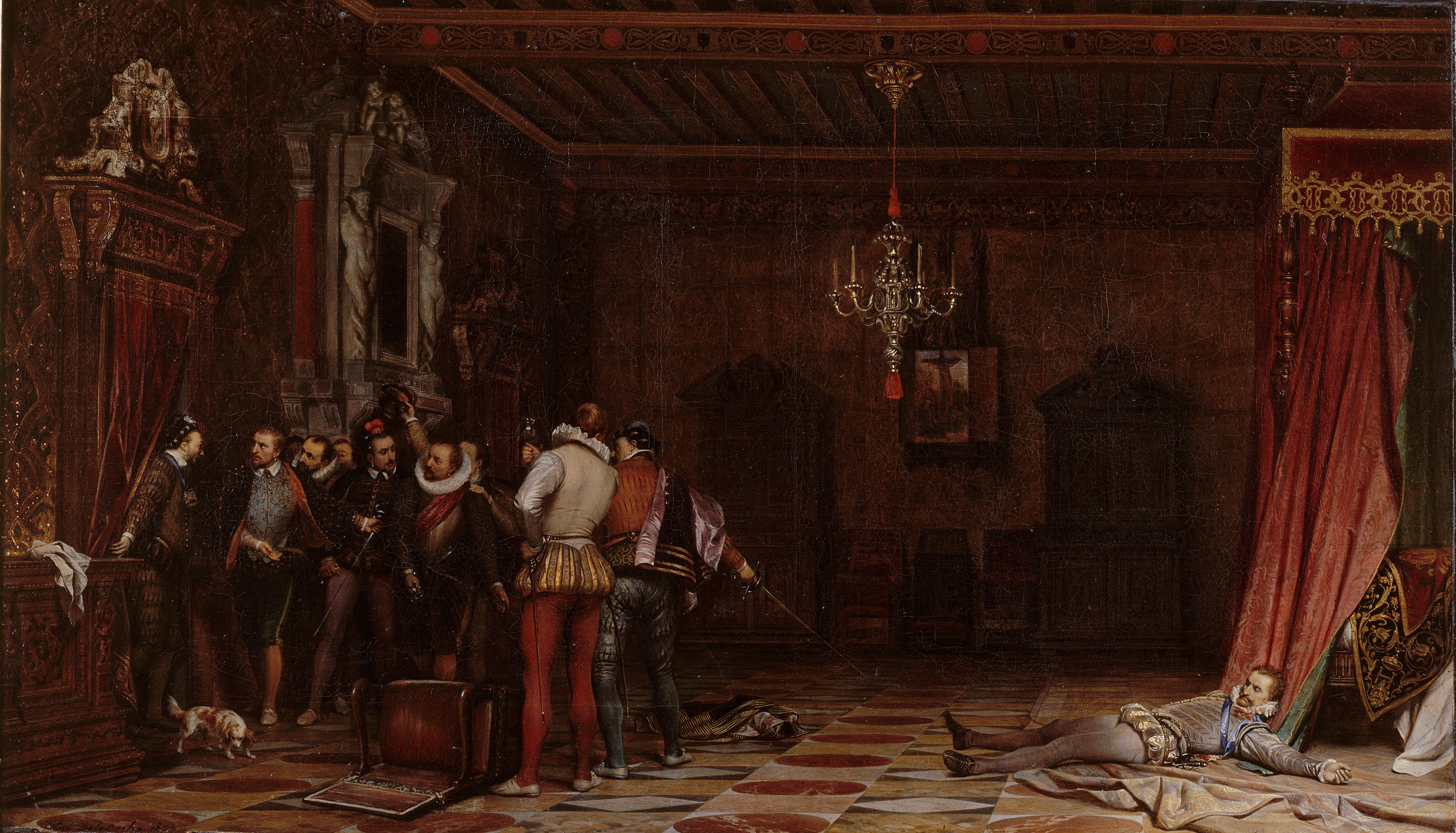
- Artist: Paul Delaroche
- Year: 1834
- Medium: Oil on canvas
- Dimensions: 57 cm × 98 cm (22 in × 39 in)
- Location: Musée Condé, Chantilly

The Assassination of the Duke of Guise is an oil-on-canvas painting by French artist Paul Delaroche, created in 1834. It is held in the Musée Condé, in Chantilly, whilst a replica hangs in the Château de Blois. Another replica was made for the 2014 exhibition L'invention du passé. Histoires de cœur et d'épée en Europe, 1802–1850, at the Museum of Fine Arts of Lyon.

== History and description ==
The painting was commissioned by Ferdinand Philippe, Duke of Orléans, in 1833, and delivered in May 1834. He liked the painting so much that he decided to double the price and paid 12,000 francs for it. Delaroche had already created two watercolors on this subject, today at the Musée Fabre and the Wallace Collection, in London. The painter also had created the costumes for a play by Alexandre Dumas called Henry III and His Court, performed in 1829. Ludovic Vitet, a friend of Delaroche, also wrote a play (never performed) which devotes a scene to the subject of the painting. In 1834, the Duke of Orléans commissioned a painting from Jean-Auguste-Dominique Ingres representing The Illness of Antiochus, which was to serve as a counterpart to Delaroche's painting.

It depicts the aftermath of Henry I, Duke of Guise's assassination by Henry III's royal guard on 23 December 1588. The scene represents the moment when Henry III, then hidden behind a curtain, appears to witness the death of the Duke of Guise, who is being greeted by the eight members of his personal guard, called the Forty-Five, who committed the crime. The entire right part of the painting is occupied by the body of the murdered duke, which lies in the ground, stained with blood. The decor and furniture of the scene are intended to be faithful to the style then current in the 16th century. The scene takes place in a dark setting.

== Cultural references ==
The early French silent film The Assassination of the Duke of Guise (1897) is believed by some to have been directly inspired by this painting.
