= The Young Martyr =

Painting by Paul Delaroche

La Jeune Martyre
- The Young Martyr (English)
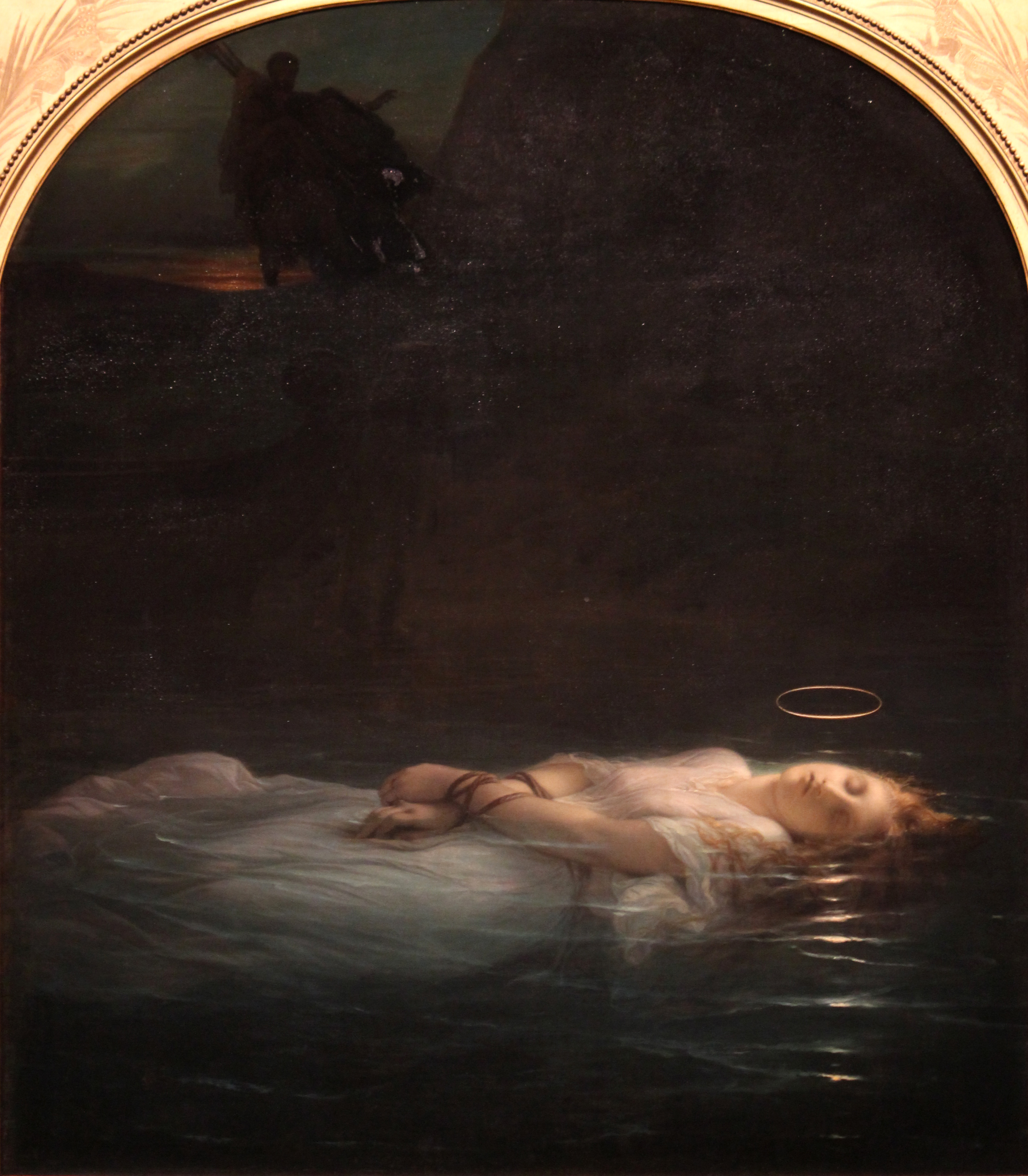
- Artist: Paul Delaroche
- Year: 1855
- Dimensions: 171 cm × 148 cm (67.3 in × 58.8 in)
- Location: Louvre, Paris

The Young Martyr (French: La Jeune Martyre) is an oil painting by the French painter Paul Delaroche. It was completed in 1855 and is based on the Romantic style of genre painting. It is held at the Louvre, in Paris. The first version of the painting is from 1853 and is held at the Hermitage Museum, in Saint Petersburg.

The Young Martyr represents both Delaroche's emphasis on historical accuracy and flair for drama and emotionality in painting as it depicts the historical martyrdom of a Christian woman, while, at the same time, an otherworldly halo, emanating above the Martyr's forehead, emphasizes the painting's dramatic, emotional effect.

== Dimensions and characteristics ==
The Young Martyr is 1.71 m × 1.48 m (5.6 ft × 4.9 ft). Although the painting is rectangular, the top of the painting is circumscribed in an ovular, golden frame.

== Details ==
Oil was Paul Delaroche's medium of choice when painting The Young Martyr, as oil allowed him to manipulate the precise details in the painting over a long period of time, and, therefore, capture a high level of detail for "the appearance of the highest finish." As such, "the dignity of forms, the striking effect of the chiaroscuro, and those bluish grey tones which seemed to suit so well the touching sadness of the subject," in The Young Martyr begins in the upper left-hand corner of the painting, where the figures of a man and a woman, embracing each other in terror upon seeing the drowned Christian, are barely visible. Although the identity of the figures is unclear, it is generally thought that they are the young Christian's parents. As the sun sets behind the couple, the last rays of light point directly across the painting towards the Martyr. Also in the upper left-hand corner of the painting, a faint white star can be seen in the sky, just above the grieving couple. The presence of this star in the painting as its inclusion may allude to other historical or religious narratives. For example, if The Young Martyr was painted as a morning scene, with the rising sun in the far background, the faint star above the grieving parents may allude to the morning star, or Lucifer, from the Bible. As such, this star would suggest the presence of the Devil, or of evil (metaphorically) in the painting. On the other hand, if The Young Martyr was painted as a scene taking place at sunset, then the star in the left-hand corner could be seen as the North Star, and, therefore, possibly as an allusion to God or Jesus. The Martyr's hands are bound by rope, as she gently floats upon the surface of the Tiber. With her body erect (potentially suggesting the rigor mortis), the Martyr, appears both dead and alive. Delaroche details around the Martyr's right hand small, delineated ripples, barely emanating from around the crests of the Martyr's fingers. Directly above the head of the Martyr is a halo. The Martyr's halo, precise and crisp, appears surreal in contrast to the rest of the painting; furthermore, this halo helps to stage The Young Martyr as it exists as the primary source of light for the otherwise dimly lit Christian.

== Possible narrative(s) ==
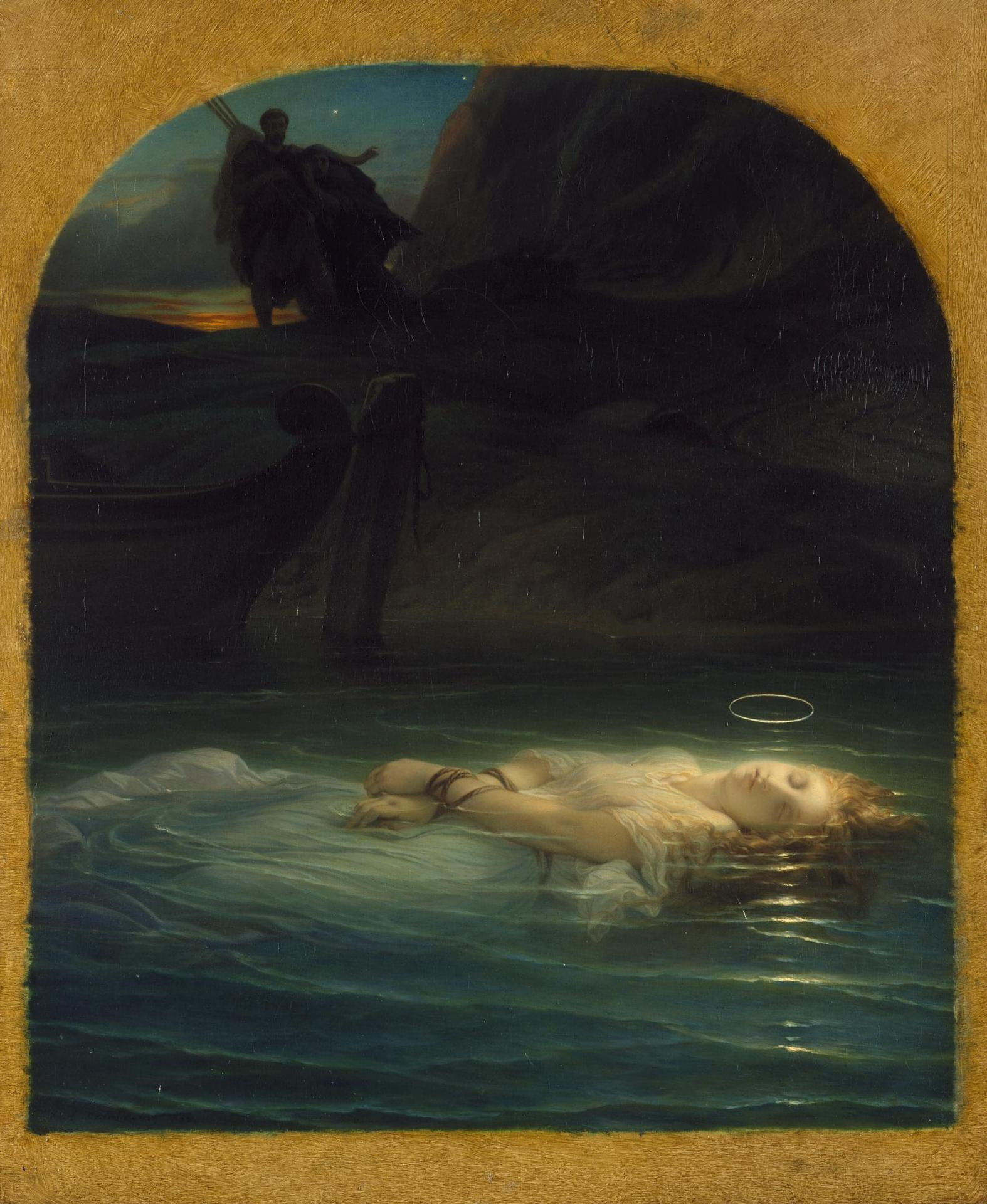
1853, version in the Hermitage

On the surface, The Young Martyr depicts the sacrifice of a young Christian woman into the Tiber River. However, what the painting alludes to is not merely the countless Christian martyrs throughout the centuries, but specifically the martyrdom of Christians under the rule of the Roman emperor Diocletian—when Christians were systematically persecuted for their religious beliefs. Briefly, the Roman Emperor Diocletian ruled in the 3rd and 4th centuries. About nineteen years into his reign, however, Diocletian, a polytheist, instituted the systematic persecution of Christians with the Diocletianic Persecution of 303–311 AD. Under these laws, Christians were expected to sacrifice and honor gods they themselves did not believe in, under penalty of imprisonment or death. As such, although the painting of The Young Martyr does not overtly allude to Diocletian, it could easily be said that, since the Diocletianic Persecution of Christians is so well known in history, and so often cited in Art, the Persecution would have served as a firm foundation for Delaroche, artistically, and would have given Delaroche ample reason to paint the martyrdom of a young Christian. Delaroche opted to depict the martyrdom of a female Christian in The Young Martyr. Although Delaroche is known to have "introduced the genii or muses, who symbolize or reign over the arts," and to have often idealized female figures, the choice to depict the martyrdom of a young woman may, more truly, have been part of Delaroche's response to the death of his wife, Louise Vernet, in 1845, whom he was known to have included as a figure in many of his paintings, for homage.
