= Cornhill, Aberdeenshire =

Village in Aberdeenshire, Scotland

Coordinates: 57.612°N 02.6981°W

Cornhill: Scottish Gaelic: Cnoc an Arbhair
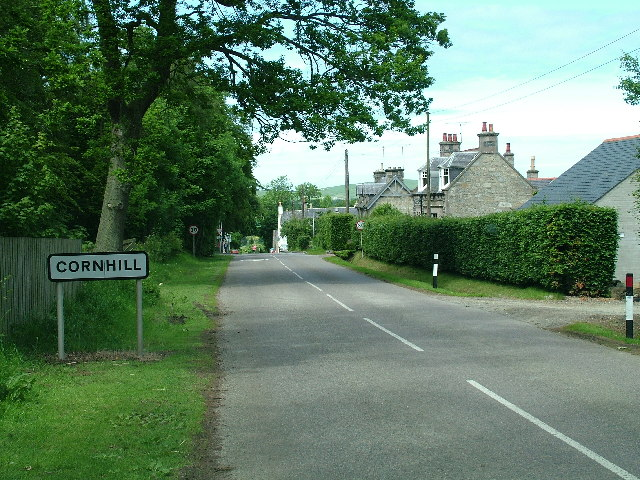
- Entering the village on the B9023 road

- Location within Aberdeenshire
- OS grid reference: NJ925065
- Council area: Aberdeenshire
- Lieutenancy area: Banffshire
- Country: Scotland
- Sovereign state: United Kingdom
- Post town: BANFF
- Postcode district: AB45
- Dialling code: 01466
- Police: Scotland
- Fire: Scottish
- Ambulance: Scottish
- UK Parliament: Aberdeenshire North and Moray East
- Scottish Parliament: Banffshire and Buchan Coast
- Website: aberdeenshire.gov.uk

Cornhill (Scottish Gaelic: Cnoc an Arbhair) is a small village close to Banff, Aberdeenshire, Scotland. It lies 5 miles (8.0 km) to the south of Portsoy. The village was originally a burgh of a feudal barony and is now a farming community.

There is the local garage Ewens of Cornhill, Post Office and the local pub Peggy Duff's (formerly the Gordon Arms). There is a nearby castle, Castle of Park, also known as Park House, which was built around 1536. There is a local Church of Scotland which is a joint church between Ordiquhill and Cornhill. Ordiquhill's own church, in Overtoun, was built around 1805. As of 1990, it was "awaiting beneficial re-use".

Cornhill has its own highland games in summer, including the Knock Hill race, an 8.5 miles (13.7 km) race up the nearby Knock Hill and back.

There is a small school Ordiquhill Primary, slightly over 1 mile (1.6 km) southwest along the A95 road.

The United Free Church was built in 1904, and the Hay Memorial Hall in 1893. Culvie House, a large three-bay house, dates to around 1730.

== Prehistory ==
There is considerable evidence of prehistoric habitation in the vicinity of Cornhill, including the extant Longman Hill barrow.

== Notable people ==
- J. Henry created the Kerr's Pink variety of potato in 1907.
- G. Morrison bred the world's most expensive sheep Deveronvale Perfection which sold for £231,000 in 2009.
