= Charles I Insulted by Cromwell's Soldiers =

1836 painting by Paul Delaroche

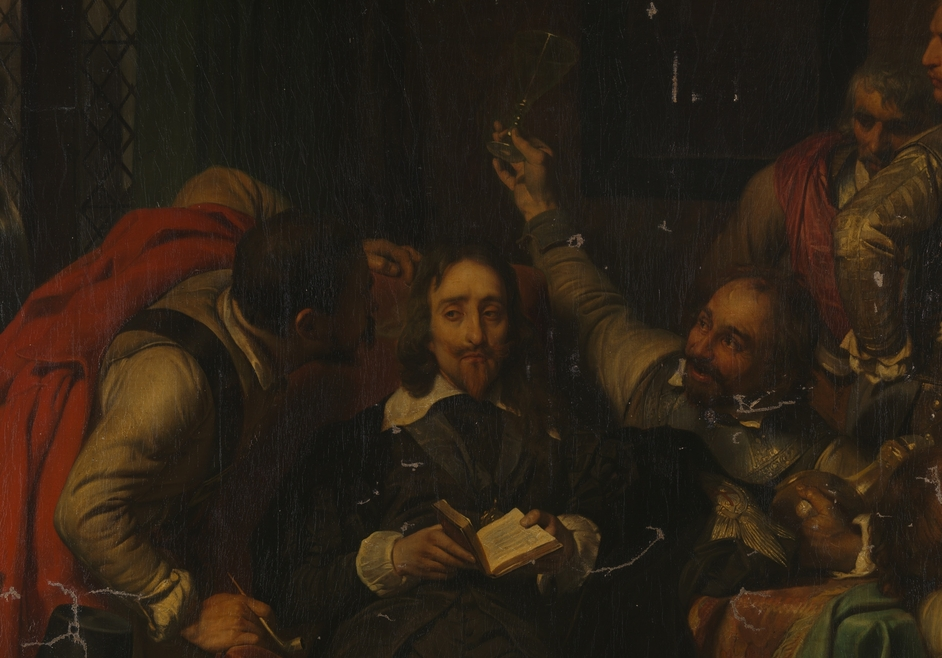
- Artist: Paul Delaroche
- Year: 1836
- Medium: Oil on canvas
- Dimensions: 300 cm × 400 cm (120 in × 156 in)
- Location: National Gallery, London

Charles I Insulted by Cromwell's Soldiers is an oil painting by the French artist Paul Delaroche, depicting Charles I of England taunted by the victorious soldiers of Oliver Cromwell after the Second English Civil War, prior to his execution in 1649. Completed in 1836, it is thought to be one of Delaroche's greatest masterpieces. It was displayed as part of the Bridgewater Collection in London, although it was latterly thought to have been lost when, during The Blitz of 1941, a German bomb struck close to Bridgewater House, causing shrapnel damage to the canvas in the ensuing explosion. In 2009 it was rediscovered in Scotland in an unexpectedly good condition, having been rolled up and stored after the war, but recorded in the intervening years as badly damaged or destroyed. After a partial restoration it went on display in the National Gallery in London in 2010, in an exhibition re-appraising Delaroche's work. After the exhibition, it was to be fully restored.

== Subject ==
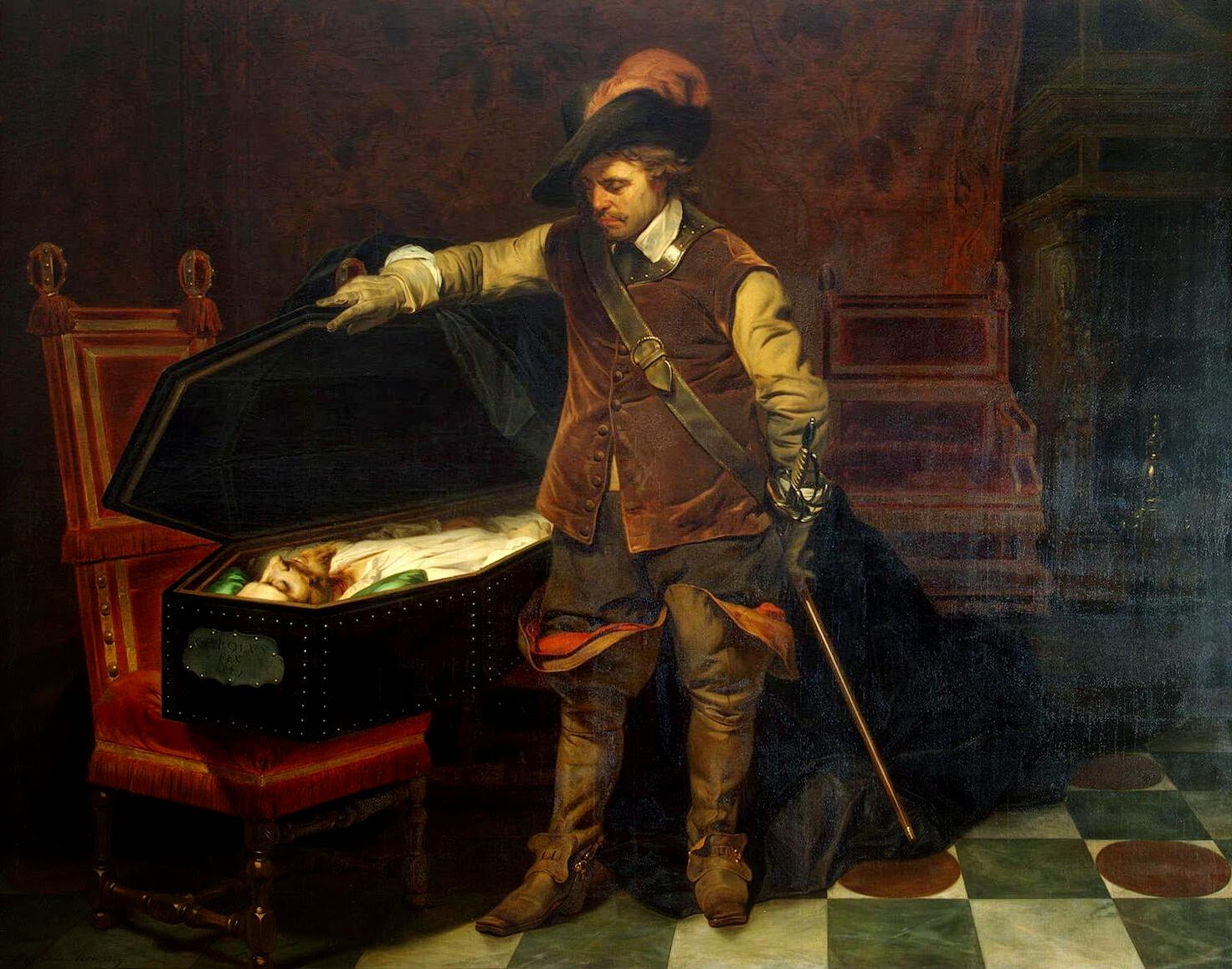
In Cromwell and Charles I painted in 1831, Delaroche also depicts Charles I, with Cromwell standing over his dead body

Charles I Insulted features Charles I, the king of England, who had by 1648 lost the Second English Civil War fought against Oliver Cromwell's New Model Army, after the Battle of Preston. By January 1649, he was being put on trial for treason, and on 30 January, he was beheaded.

The painting depicts Charles in the days before his execution, being bullied and taunted by Cromwell's defiant troops, one of whom is blowing pipe smoke in his face. The deposed king remains calm, holding a book which he appears to have been reading.

== Ownership ==
Delaroche's Charles I Insulted was commissioned by Francis Egerton, 1st Earl of Ellesmere, who was known as Lord Francis Leveson-Gower until 1833 when, following the death of his father, he was created the first Earl of Ellesmere, inheriting Bridgewater House in London from his bachelor great uncle, Francis Egerton, 3rd Duke of Bridgewater. The family line of the Earls of Ellesmere became the Dukes of Sutherland when, in 1963, John Egerton, 5th Earl of Ellesmere, succeeded to the title of Duke of Sutherland on the death of the 5th Duke of Sutherland with no male heir in the elder line. As of its rediscovery in 2009, the painting remained privately owned by the present Duke, Francis Egerton, 7th Duke of Sutherland. The 7th Duke was the 6th Duke's cousin and heir to the Dukedom, since the 6th Duke had no children himself.

== History ==
=== 1836 to 2009 ===
Charles I Insulted is a large piece, painted on a canvas measuring 13 feet (4.0 m) by 10 feet (3.0 m)., also described as being nearly three metres square. It was completed in 1836. It was first displayed at the Paris Salon of 1837, and in 1838 at the British Institution in London. The painting was then hung for decades as part of the semi-public Bridgewater Collection in Bridgewater House in London.

The painting suffered serious damage during a Second World War German bombing raid on London. On 11 May 1941, during the last night and most deadly raid of what became known as The Blitz, one bomb landed on the street outside Bridgewater House, leaving a 3-metre (9.8 ft) deep bomb crater. Hanging in the dining room at the time, the painting suffered extensive shrapnel damage. At least four paintings in the collection were totally destroyed in the raid, while others less damaged were eventually restored. Charles I Insulted was demounted and rolled up, having been given a rudimentary repair using paper to hold together the largest tears. After the war, it was transported to Mertoun House in St Boswells, Roxburghshire, the family's Scottish home, for storage.

While stored safe and dry in Mertoun, over the next 68 years the existence of the painting was gradually forgotten about by its owners, and presumed by the art world to be lost as irreparably damaged in the raid.

=== 2009 onwards ===
The painting was rediscovered in the summer of 2009 by National Gallery curators, after they made enquiries about the painting as they prepared a Delaroche exhibition. The 2010 exhibition was to be the first major show on Delaroche to be held in Britain, aiming to reassess the works of Delaroche, who fell out of fashion during the early 20th century, and featuring his most famous work from the National Gallery collection, The Execution of Lady Jane Grey (1833), which was also a rediscovered work: it had been thought lost when the Tate Gallery was flooded in 1928, and was found rolled up in 1973.

On 7 June 2009 at Mertoun, it was unrolled for the first time since being moved to Scotland. To the surprise of those present, the painting was largely intact, having "lost none of its intensity". The explosion damage consisted of around 200 individual tears in the canvas, which still contained plaster fragments and dust from the blast.

After moving the painting to London, it was restored sufficiently to be able to be displayed in the exhibition, albeit with the shrapnel scars still visible, and "somewhat yellowed by a layer of discoloured varnish". Because the canvas had been rolled up for nearly 70 years, it had to be weighed down flat for six weeks. The tears were then stitched together, and the canvas lined.

The painting's first ever public display since rediscovery was as part of the exhibition Painting History: Delaroche and Lady Jane Grey, running from 24 February to 24 May 2010. It went on display on 23 February in a separate room in the museum's free admission area, with the main part of the exhibition held in the adjacent Sainsbury Wing of the gallery. The painting was to be fully restored after the London exhibition whereupon work started to remove the discoloured varnish and retouch the damaged areas.

== Reception ==
According to the London National Gallery, it is "one of the great paintings on themes of English history for which Delaroche had become renowned", in which Delaroche was "able to imply striking parallels between the poignant fate of Charles and the recent course of French history". According to the gallery director Nicholas Penny, the rediscovery was "huge" and its redisplay would be an historic moment, describing it as "an extraordinarily powerful work", "one of the great French paintings" and by "one of the greatest painters" of the 19th century. According to Penny, Delaroche, a Frenchman, was a notable painter of Tudor and Stuart history, as a method of "exploring the violence and vicissitudes of the French Revolution" without actually portraying the events themselves, which were regarded as too recent to paint.

According to the National Gallery's exhibition curator Christopher Riopelle, both Charles I Insulted and Delaroche's other painting, Marie-Antoinette Before the Tribunal, painted fifteen years later in 1851, "suggest episodes of the suffering of Christ". Riopelle added that Delaroche's "obsession with English royalist history" was "classic displacement of what you want to talk about but can't, because it's still so raw and recent", particularly referring to the execution of Louis XVI in January 1793, and nine months later of his Queen Marie Antoinette.

Charlotte Higgins of The Guardian described it as "one of Delaroche's masterpieces", which "owes a debt" to Anthony van Dyck's famous painting of Charles I. Higgins also said that it "clearly references the popular artistic subject of the mocking of Christ by his guards". According to Arifa Akbar of The Independent, "Delaroche's monumental painting featuring Charles I as a Christ-like figure" is regarded as "one of Delaroche's most powerful pieces", commissioned at the "height of his fame".

David Horspool of The Times, reflecting on the fate of Delaroche's Execution of Lady Jane Grey which was relegated to a basement (in which it was later flood damaged), due to Delaroche's falling fame, said "there seems no chance that [Charles I Insulted] will be rolled up and put away. Delaroche's days as the forgotten master seem to be over", predicting the rediscovered piece would be perhaps "the most exciting exhibit to go on display" in the 2010 National Gallery exhibition.
