= Castle of Park (Aberdeenshire) =

Building in Aberchirder, Aberdeenshire, Scotland

Coordinates: 57.6024°N 2.6894°W

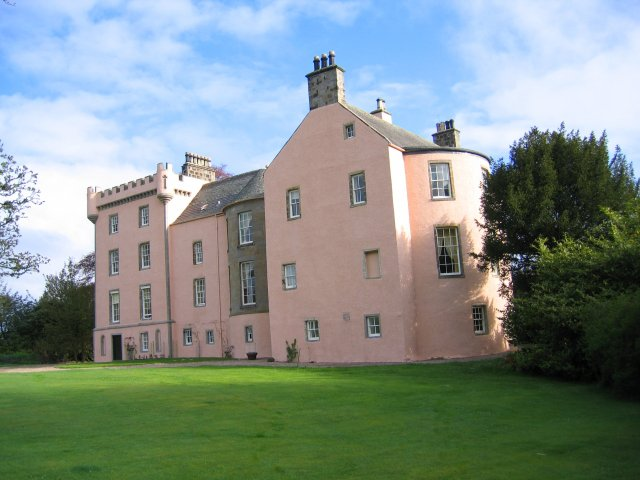
- The castle in 2004
- Interactive map of Castle of Park (Aberdeenshire)

Park or Castle of Park, is an A-listed rambling baronial mansion incorporating a 16th-century tower house. It is 4 miles (6.4 km) north-west of Aberchirder, Aberdeenshire, Scotland.

== History ==
The Park estate originally formed part of the Royal Forest of Banff, but was gifted to Sir Waleran de Normanville in 1242 by Alexander II of Scotland. The first castle on this property was built in 1292 and was for some time a refuge of Robert the Bruce. In 1536, it was rebuilt as a Z-plan tower house. It was extensively remodeled in 1717, expanded in 1723, again in 1829, and has continued to be modified in the years since.

In 1605, the castle was sold to Sir Adam Gordon of Clan Gordon. Born in 1586, Sir Adam Gordon of Glenbuchat Castle succeeded to the Lairdship of Park in 1623, becoming the first Laird. Sir John Gordon was created the 1st Baronet of Park on 15th August, 1686. Sir William Gordon, 3rd Baronet of Park, fought for the Jacobites during the Jacobite rising of 1745. He was captured by the English at the Battle of Culloden, imprisoned and later executed. The property was forfeited, and was acquired by Clan Duff.

The property remained under ownership of Clan Duff for nearly 400 years. In the late 1970s, it was sold to a Dutch dentist, Rudi Ovenveldt, then again in the late 1980s to a painter, James Duncan, who ran the castle as a hotel and restaurant. In 2000, the castle was purchased by Bill and Lois Breckon, after which it underwent significant renovation in order to house students for on-site art courses.

In 2007, the property was purchased by Rebecca and Neil Wilson, who lived there while undertaking historic restorations. During the early 2010s, the Wilsons began running the castle as a B&B and later as a self-catering facility. In 2020, the castle was listed for sale for £1,500,000, although reviews by guests were still being left on Google in 2022. As of 2026 the location was noted as "permanently closed".

In 2016, the property was featured in an episode of Fake or Fortune?.

== Structure ==
The castle incorporated in the newer mansion is a Z-plan tower house, dating from the 1563 rebuilding. It is finished in harl, and features a medieval whetstone used as an interior arch. There are several Victorian additions, though the 12 Georgian windows are still clearly in evidence. Today, roughly 45 acres, the Park Burn (landform) and several 250 year old sycamore trees remain of what was once the vast estate of the baronetcy of Park.

== See also ==
- Castles in Great Britain and Ireland
- List of castles in Scotland
- Saint Amelia, Queen of Hungary
