= The Children of Edward =

Painting by Paul Delaroche

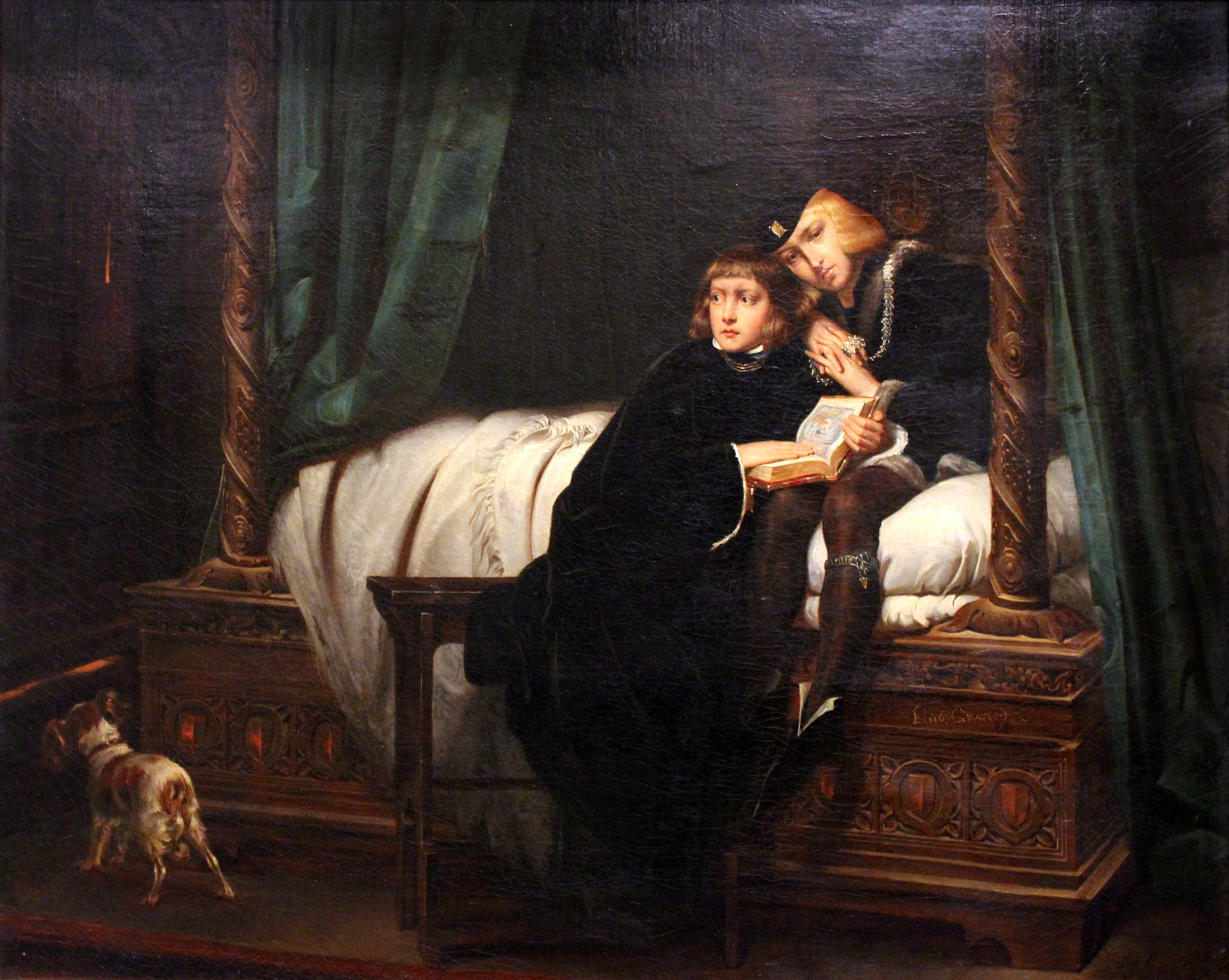
- Artist: Paul Delaroche
- Year: 1830
- Medium: Oil on canvas, history painting
- Dimensions: 181 cm × 215 cm (71 in × 85 in)
- Location: Louvre, Paris

The Children of Edward is an oil on canvas painting by French painter Paul Delaroche, created in 1830. It is held in the Louvre, in Paris.

== History ==
In 1827, Delaroche traveled to London, where he visited the Tower of London. He was very interested about the story of the Princes in the Tower, and decided to create an historical painting inspired by the subject. He did a detailed research on the decorations and objects of the 15th century for the current painting. The canvas was first shown at the Salon of 1831. At the time, it was defined as a very moving painting, a "tearjerker", similarly to another later painting by the same painter, The Execution of Lady Jane Grey (1833).

== Description ==
The painting focuses on the theme of the Princes in the Tower, namely King Edward V and Richard of Shrewsbury, imprisoned in the Tower of London at the behest of the regency council, after the death of their father Edward IV. The two princes were declared illegitimate through the act known as Titulus Regius, so the council of safety decreed their uncle, who became Richard III, as successor. This depiction shows the two children huddling together, sensing their murderous fate. Their murder is usually believed to have been ordered by Richard III, even if there is no concrete historical evidence of that. The dramatic tension of the scene is highlighted by the small dog in alert, at the left, the light that enters under the door and the anxious gaze of one of the children; all these details suggest an imminent entrance and accentuate the drama of the scene.

The episode of the princes in the Tower also appears at the end of an act of the play Richard III, by William Shakespeare, which knew a wide diffusion in France at the time. Several elements of the canvas give a late medieval atmosphere: one of the children holds a book where there is a miniature of the Annunciation of Mary; the medallion with a goldsmith's work; and the decoration of the bed. Several English references shown are the royal emblems at the foot of the bed and the ribbon of the Order of the Garter on the leg of one of children.

== Provenance ==
In 1831 it was bought by the French state for 6000 francs and placed in the Musée du Luxembourg. In 1878 it entered the Louvre, in Paris.

== See also ==
- The Murder of the Princes in the Tower, a 1786 painting by James Northcote
- The Princes in the Tower, an 1878 painting by John Everett Millais
