= Portrait of John Ruskin =

Portrait of John Ruskin may refer to:

- John Ruskin (Millais), an 1853–1854 portrait of John Ruskin by John Everett Millais
- Portrait of John Ruskin (Northcote), an 1822 portrait of John Ruskin by James Northcote
