= Lafayette in the Dungeon of Olmütz =

Painting by James Northcote

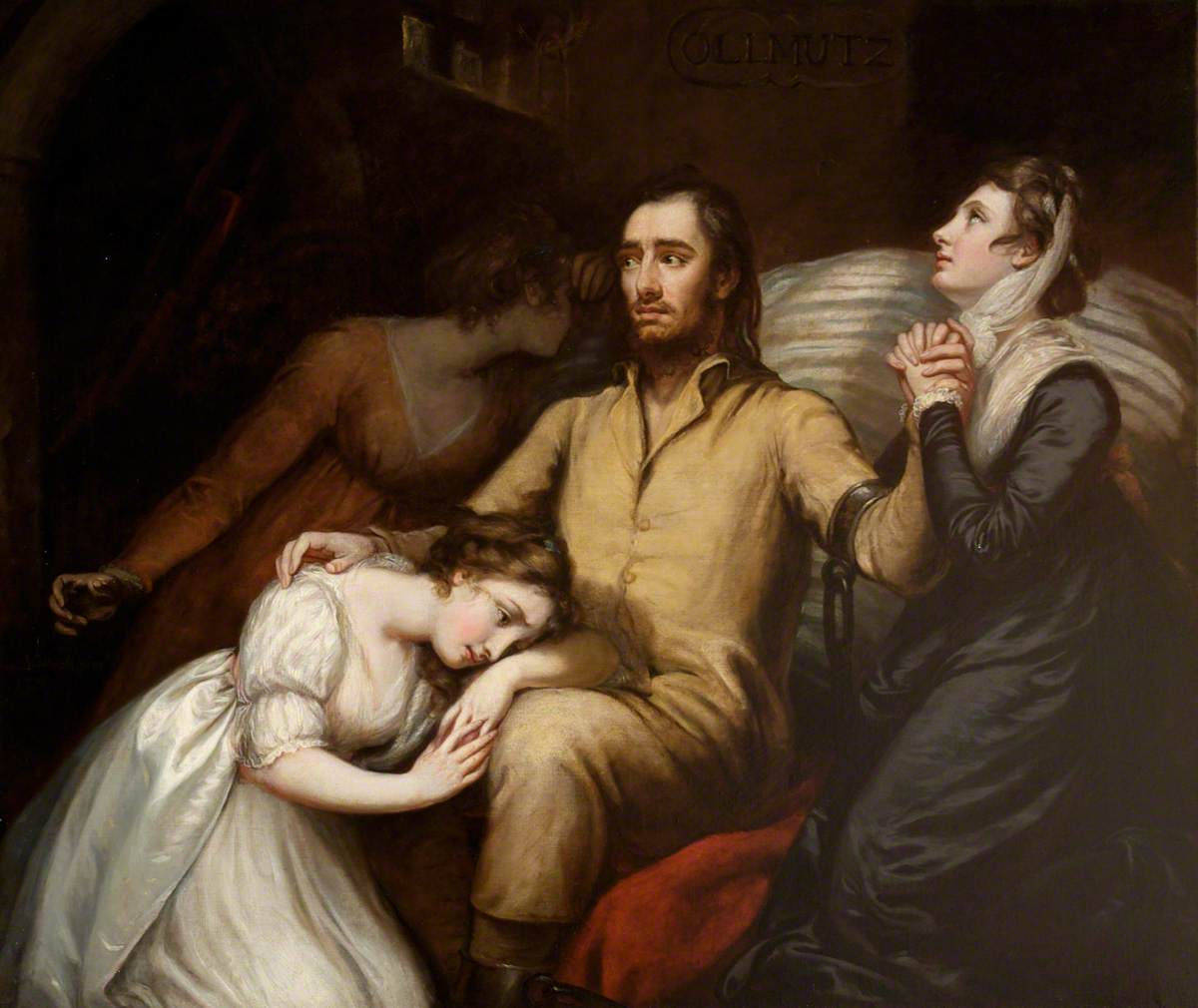
- Artist: James Northcote
- Year: 1797
- Type: Oil on canvas, history painting
- Dimensions: 143 cm × 178.6 cm (56 in × 70.3 in)
- Location: Tabley House, Cheshire

Lafayette in the Dungeon of Olmütz is an 1797 oil painting by the British artist James Northcote. It portrays the inprionsment of the French aristocrat and General Gilbert du Motier, Marquis de Lafayette at the fortress of Olmütz in Austrian-ruled Moravia.

Lafayette had played a prominent role in the early years of the French Revolution, but in August 1792 as the Reign of Terror approached he fled and was captured by Austrian troops. The Austrians held Lafayette responsible for his role in the revolution against Louis XVI and his Austrian queen Marie Antoinette the aunt of Francis II. Although Lafayette supported a constitutional monarchy, his arrest by the Austrians coincided with the creation of a Jacobin-led revolutionary republic, the September Massacres and the Execution of Louis XVI and Marie Antoinette the following year.

Lafayette was kept in close confinement, although he was later allowed to be joined by his wife Adrienne and daughters, which is shown in the painting. In Britain liberal opposition figures put pressure on the Prime Minister William Pitt to appeal to Britain's ally Austria to free Lafayette, leveraging the large subsides London was paying Vienna. Pitt refused to intervene, but the case became a cause célèbre. Northcote was directly appealing to this when he produced the painting. It was acquired by the art collector Sir John Leicester. Lafayette was ultimately released into American custody in 1797 following the Treaty of Campo Formio.

In 1857 the painting was displayed at the Art Treasures Exhibition in Manchester. Today it hangs at Tabley House in Cheshire, the historic residence of Sir John Leicester.

In 1805 a mezzotint was produced by Samuel William Reynolds based on the painting. It enjoyed popular success and was titled The Prisoner emphasising more the supportive family aa a generic scene rather than specifically Lafayette as British feelings remained ambiguous towards him.

== Bibliography ==
- Cannon-Brookes, Peter. Paintings from Tabley. Heim Gallery, 1989.
- Duncan, Mike. Hero of Two Worlds: The Marquis de Lafayette in the Age of Revolution. PublicAffairs, 2021.
- Hamilton, George. The English School: A Series of the Most Approved Productions in Painting and Sculpture, Executed by British Artists from the Days of Hogarth to the Present Time, Volume I. George Tilt, 1831.
- Pergam, Elizabeth A. The Manchester Art Treasures Exhibition of 1857. Routledge, 2017.
