= Jael and Sisera (Northcote) =

Painting by James Northcote

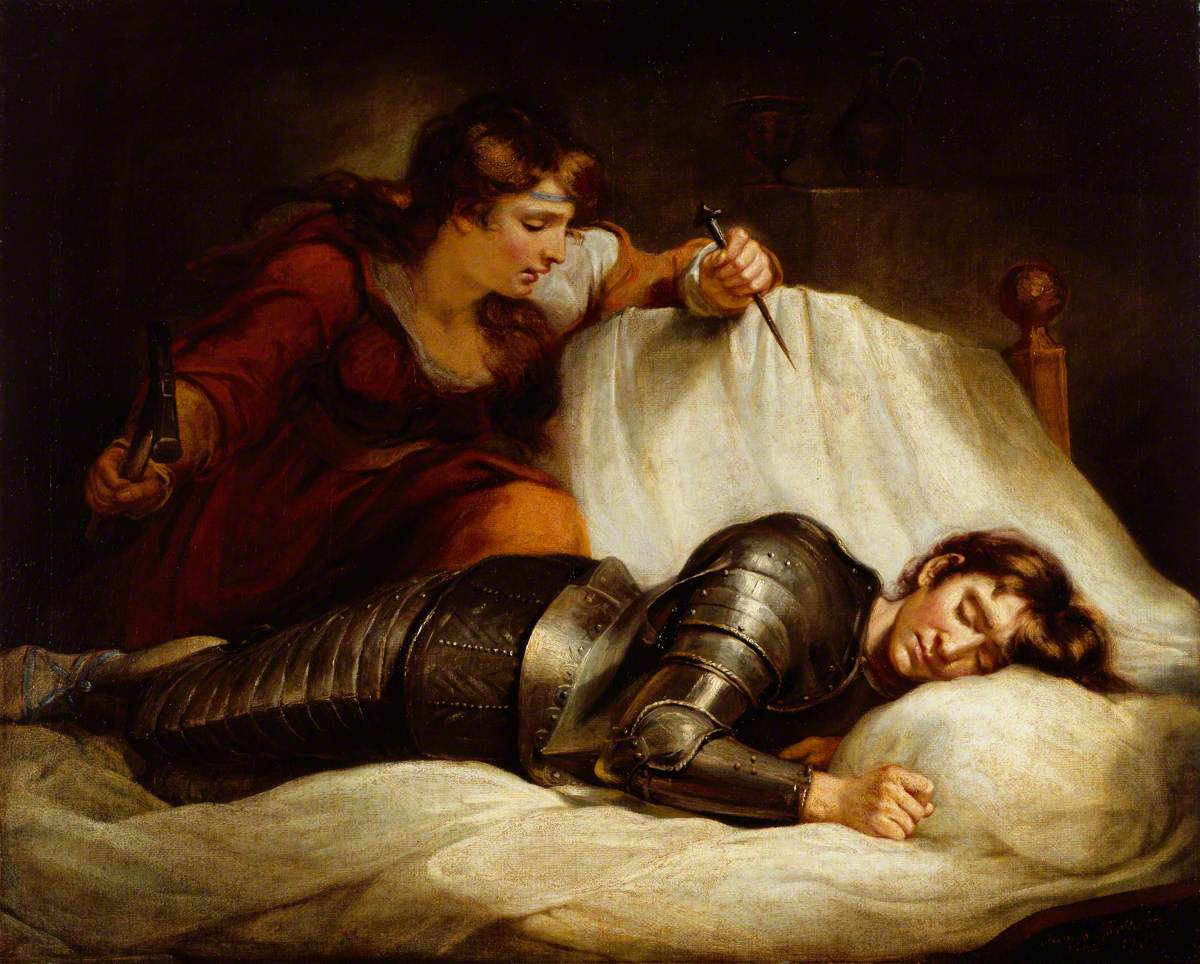
- Artist: James Northcote
- Year: 1787
- Type: Oil on canvas, religious painting
- Dimensions: 124.5 cm × 155 cm (49.0 in × 61 in)
- Location: Royal Academy of Arts; London

Jael and Sisera is an oil on canvas religious history painting by the British artist James Northcote, from 1787.

== History and description ==
It depicts a scene from the Old Testament Book of Judges, featuring Jael and Sisera. Jael, a Kenite woman allied to the Jews, is about to slay the Canaanite general Sisera by driving a tent peg through his head. He is depicted as a beardless young man, dressed in armor, and is seen sleeping peacefully in a white sheets bed. Jael, with her hammer and tent peg is about to kill him. The subject had been a popular one in art.

Northcote had been a pupil and protégé of the first President of the Royal Academy Joshua Reynolds. When Northcote was elected to full members of the Royal Academy in 1787, he was required to submit a diploma work and chose this painting. It was displayed at the Art Treasures Exhibition in Manchester in 1857. It remains in the collection of the Royal Academy, now based in Burlington House. Northcote's depiction became one of the most popular illustrations for the scene during the nineteenth century.

== Bibliography ==
- Gunn, David. Judges Through the Centuries. Wiley, 2005
- Newsom, Carol A., Ringe, Sharon H. & Lapsley, Jacqueline E. (ed.) Women's Bible Commentary, Third Edition. Presbyterian Publishing Corporation, 2021
- Pergam, Elizabeth A. The Manchester Art Treasures Exhibition of 1857. Routledge, 2017
