= Portrait of Henry Fuseli =

Painting by James Northcote

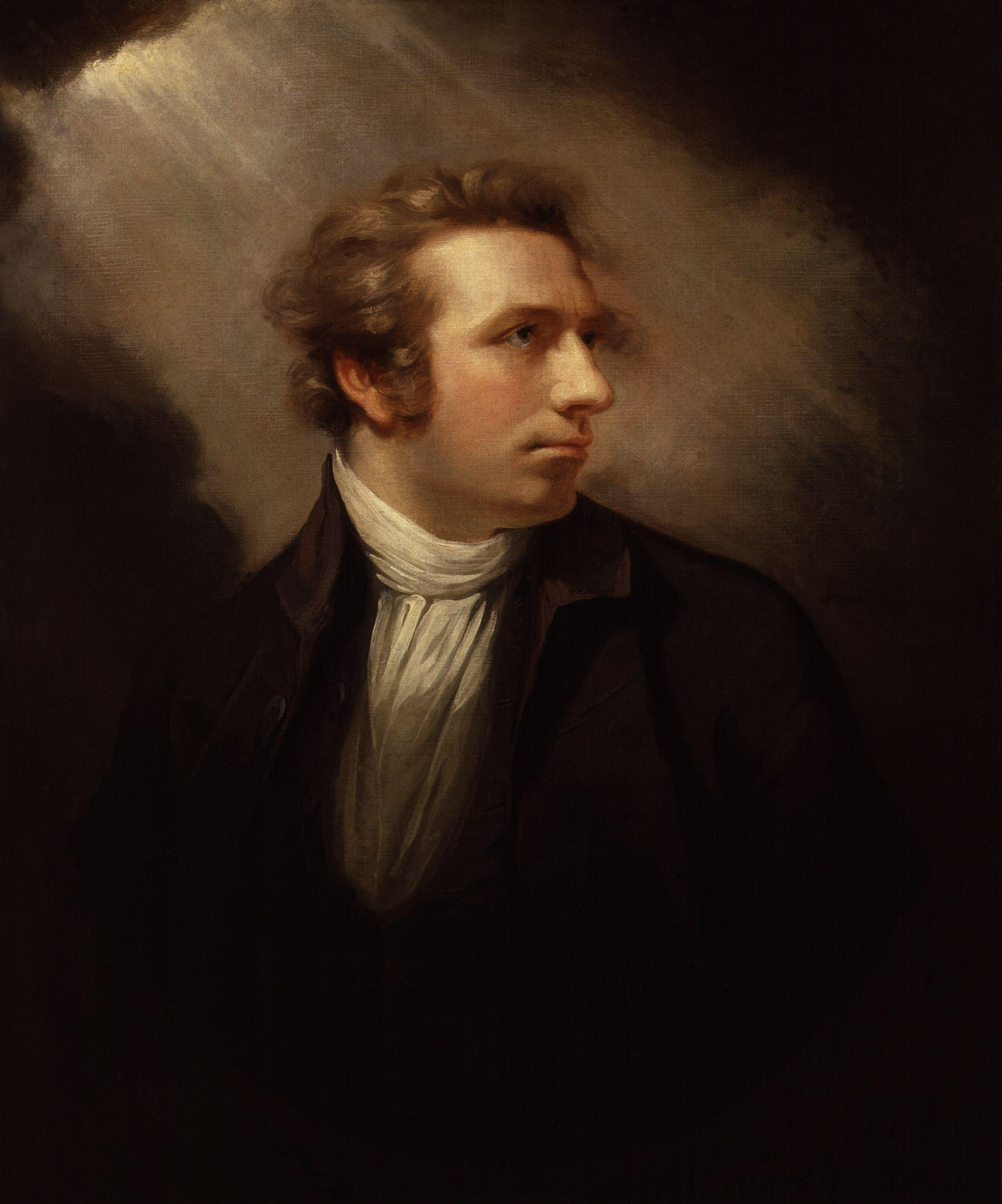
- Artist: James Northcote
- Year: 1778
- Type: Oil on canvas, portrait painting
- Dimensions: 77.8 cm × 64.5 cm (30.6 in × 25.4 in)
- Location: National Portrait Gallery; London

Portrait of Henry Fuseli is an oil on canvas portrait painting by the British artist James Northcote, from 1778. It depicts the Swiss painter Henry Fuseli.

== History ==
The picture was produced while the two were in Rome, where they first met and rapidly became friends. Northcote was a protégé of Joshua Reynolds while Fuseli became known for his unusual, expressive Gothic-inspired works. Both men became prominent members of the Royal Academy of Arts in London. Despite their friendship Northcote commented that he felt Fuseli "has a manner with him that never appears to me like that of a gentleman, but more like that of a Swiss valet". Today the painting is in the collection of the National Portrait Gallery, in London, having been acquired in 1982.

== Bibliography ==
- Derbyshire, Valerie. The Picturesque, the Sublime, the Beautiful: Visual Artistry in the Works of Charlotte Smith (1749-1806).
- Myrone, Martin. Henry Fuseli. Tate Publishing, 2001.
- Powell, Nicholas. Fuseli: The Nightmare. Allen Lane, 1973.
