= The Presentation of British Officers to Pope Pius VI, 1794 =

Painting by James Northcote

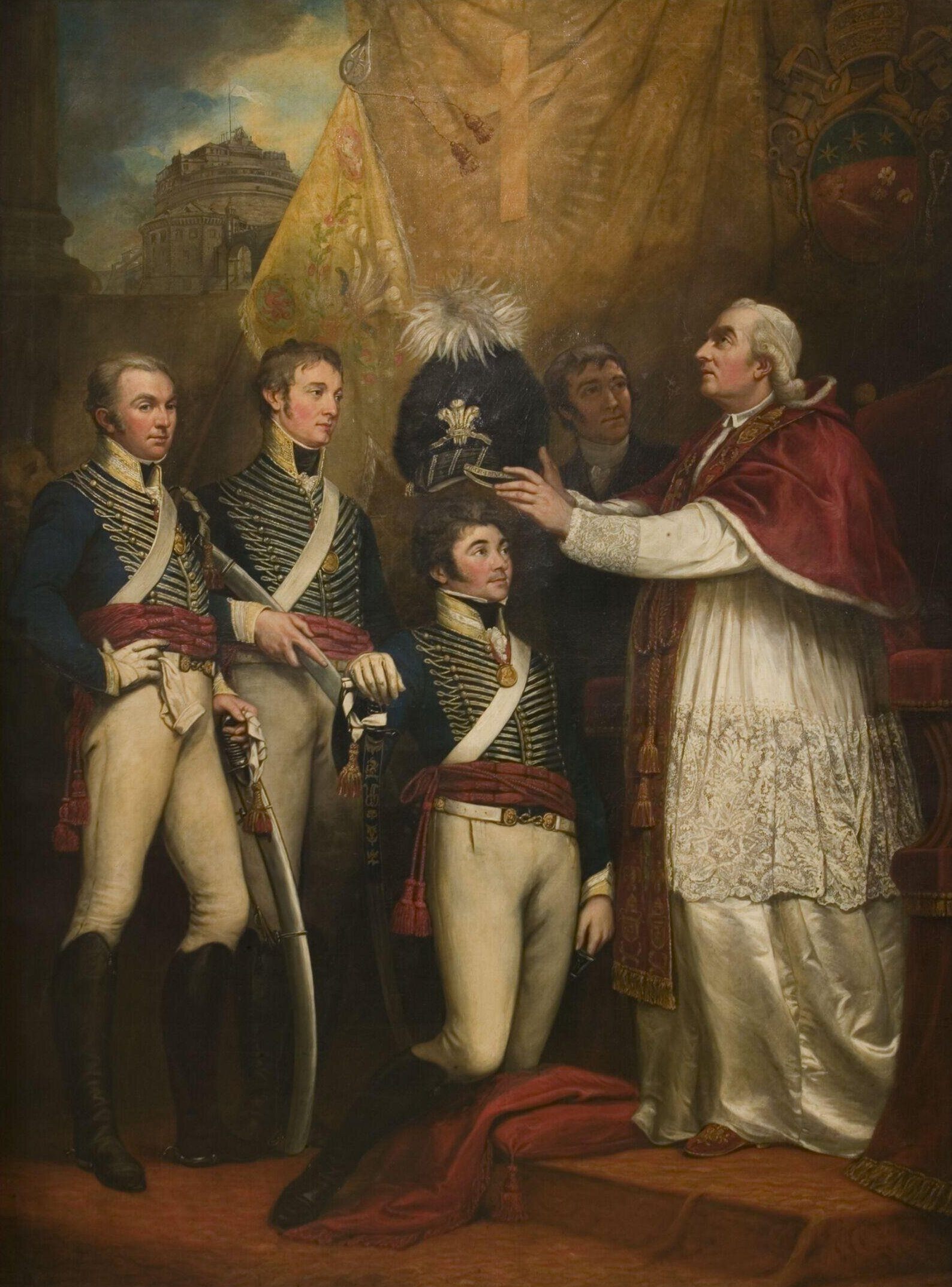
- Artist: James Northcote
- Year: 1800
- Type: Oil on canvas, history painting
- Dimensions: 287 cm × 215.9 cm (113 in × 85.0 in)
- Location: Victoria and Albert Museum, London

The Presentation of British Officers to Pope Pius VI, 1794 is an 1800 oil painting by the British artist James Northcote. It depicts a scene from 1794 during the French Revolutionary Wars. The 12th Light Dragoons of the British Army were stationed in the seaport Civitavecchia to defend it from the French Republic. Hearing of the good conduct of the regiment, Pope Pius VI invited the officers to Rome to be presented with gold medals. The moment was seen as a symbolic reconciliation between the Papacy and Protestant Britain as they faced the threat of the French Revolutionaries known for their violent anticlericalism. It depicts the moment when the kneeling Captain Brown's helmet was held aloft by the Pope who stated "that Heaven would enable the cause of truth and religion to triumph over injustice and infidelity". Castel Sant'Angelo is seen in the background, emphasising the setting in Rome.

Northcote had been a noted pupil of Joshua Reynolds and became a prominent member of the Royal Academy of Arts. The picture hung at Adlington Hall in Lancashire, the residence of one of the officers depicted. The painting is now in the collection of the Victoria and Albert Museum in South Kensington, having been acquired in 1863.

== Bibliography ==
- Fletcher, Stella. The Popes and Britain: A History of Rule, Rupture and Reconciliation. Bloomsbury Publishing, 2017.
- Roe, Sonia. Oil Paintings in Public Ownership in the Victoria and Albert Museum. Public Catalogue Foundation, 2008.
