= The Murder of the Princes in the Tower =

1786 painting by James Northcote

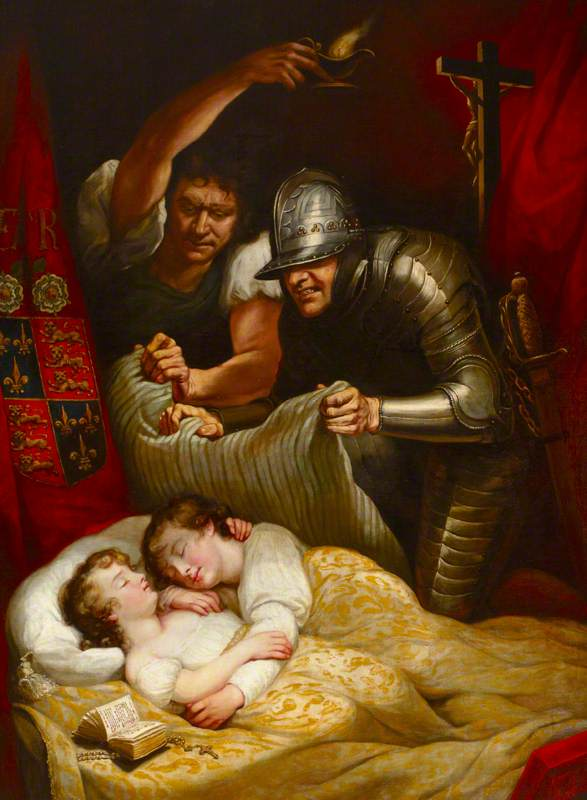
- Artist: James Northcote
- Year: 1786
- Type: Oil on canvas, history painting
- Dimensions: 137 cm × 178 cm (54 in × 70 in)
- Location: Petworth House, Sussex

The Murder of the Princes in the Tower is an oil on canvas history painting by the British artist James Northcote, from 1786.

== History and description ==
The painting depicts a scene from the late fifteenth century England, referencing the belief that the Princes in the Tower had been murdered, as depicted also in William Shakespeare's Richard III. The children of the former monarch Edward IV are seen sleeping peacefully in the arms of each others. They are about to be smothered to death in the Tower of London by two men, on the orders of his uncle Richard III. The man in the right wears an armor, complete with an helmet, that covers his eyes. The other helds a lamp hight to illuminate what is about the happen. The room curtains are red, and a crucifix is seen at the upper left, giving a martyrdom-like atmosphere to the scene.

Northcote displayed the work at the Royal Academy Exhibition of 1786 at Somerset House, after which it was bought by the publisher John Boydell. It was exhibited at his Shakespeare Gallery in Pall Mall. It was subsequently acquired by the art collector George Wyndham, 3rd Earl of Egremont for his country estate at Petworth House in Sussex. It remains in the collection at Petworth, a National Trust property.

== See also ==
- The Children of Edward, an 1830 painting by Paul Delaroche

== Bibliography ==
- Bann, Stephen. Paul Delaroche: History Painted. Reaktion Books, 1997
- Baudino, Isabelle. Eighteenth-Century Engravings and Visual History in Britain. Taylor & Francis, 2023
- Porter, Stephen. The Tower of London: The Biography. Amberley Publishing, 2012
