= Ira Aldridge as Othello =

1826 painting by James Northcote

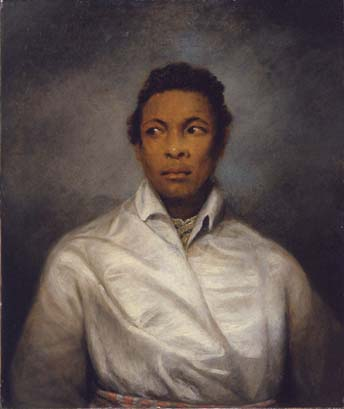
- Artist: James Northcote
- Year: 1826
- Type: Oil on canvas, portrait painting
- Dimensions: 76.2 cm × 63.5 cm (30.0 in × 25.0 in)
- Location: Manchester Art Gallery, Manchester

Ira Aldridge as Othello is an oil on canvas portrait painting by the British artist James Northcote, from 1826. It depicts the Anglo-American actor Ira Aldridge in the role of Othello in William Shakespeare's play of the same title. The New York-born Aldridge moved to Britain on 1824 where he lived and worked for decades.

Northcote was a veteran artist who had once been the pupil of Joshua Reynolds. The painting is now in the collection of Manchester Art Gallery, having been transferred from the Royal Manchester Institution in 1882.

== Bibliography ==
- Dabydeen, David. The Black Presence in English Literature. Manchester University Press, 1985.
- Piccitto, Diane & Robinson, Terry F. The Visual Life of Romantic Theater, 1780–1830. University of Michigan Press, 2023.
