= Portrait of Marc Isambard Brunel =

Painting by James Northcote

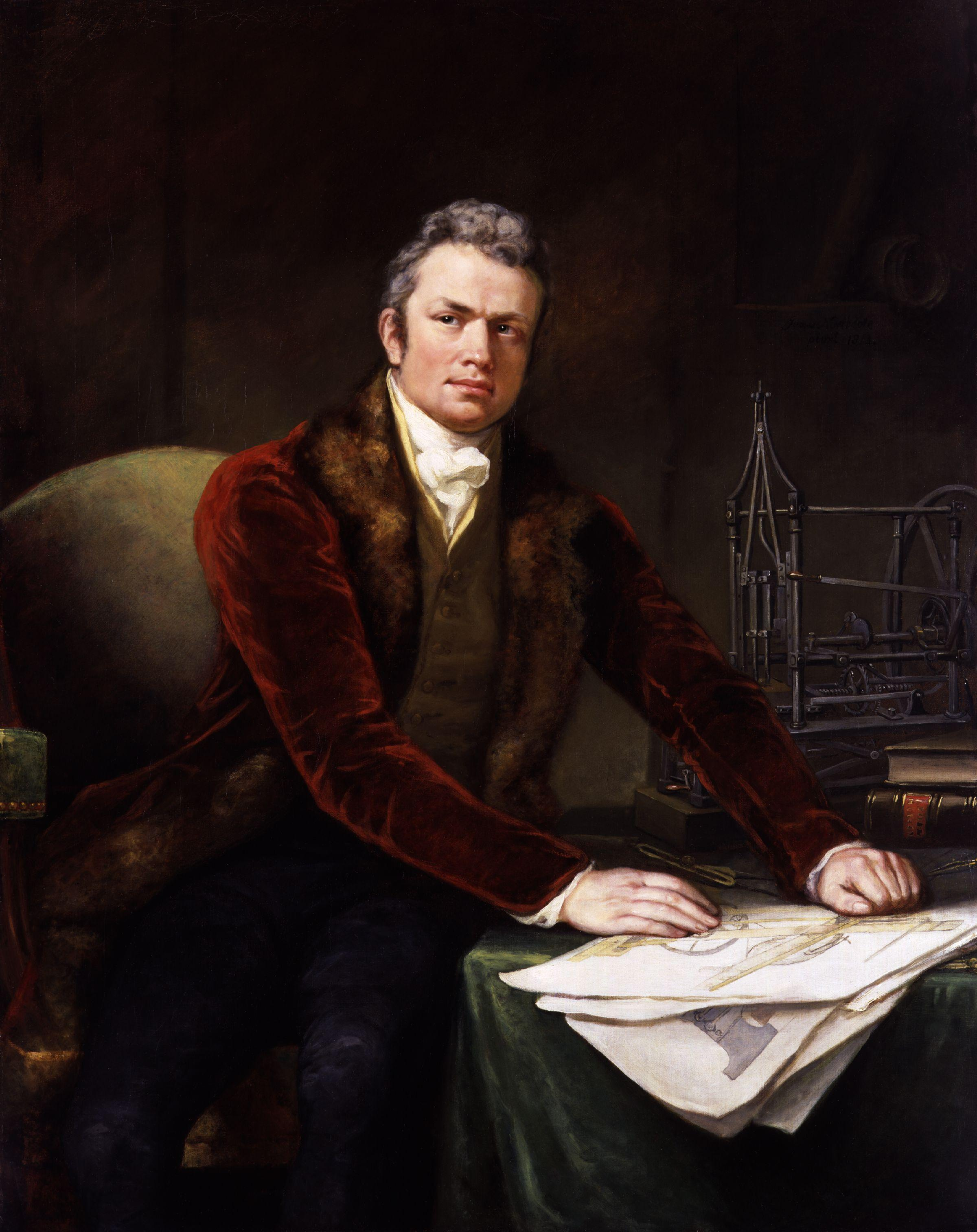
- Artist: James Northcote
- Year: 1812-1813
- Type: Oil on canvas, portrait
- Dimensions: 125.1 cm × 99.1 cm (49.3 in × 39.0 in)
- Location: National Portrait Gallery, London

The Portrait of Marc Isambard Brunel is an oil on canvas portrait painting by the English artist James Northcote, from 1812-1813. It depicts the French-born British engineer Marc Isambard Brunel.

== History and description ==
Brunel was a pioneering engineer of the Regency era known particularly for his creation of a block-making machine during the Napoleonic Wars and his later construction of the Thames Tunnel, a project which also involved his son Isambard Kingdom Brunel.

Northcote was a member of the Royal Academy and established portraitist. It was exhibited at the academy's Summer Exhibition in 1814. He was paid twenty guineas for the portrait, which was commissioned by Thomas Mudge, Brunel's business partner and the brother-in-law of his wife.

The work shows Brunel in a velvet coat with a model of one of his block-making machines in the background. Today it is part of the collection of the National Portrait Gallery, in London, having been donated by the sitter's grandson, Henry Marc Brunel in 1895.

== Bibliography ==
- Buchanan, R. Angus. Brunel: The Life and Times of Isambard Kingdom Brunel. A&C Black, 2006
- Burton, Anthony. The Brunels: Father and Son. Pen and Sword Transport, 2022
