= Memoirs of Sir Joshua Reynolds =

1813 biography

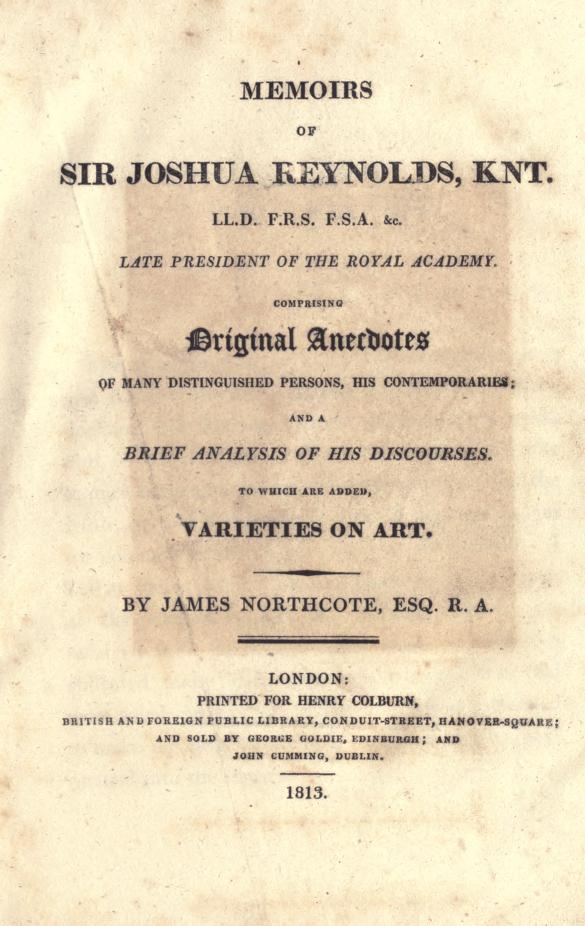
- Author: James Northcote
- Language: English
- Publisher: Henry Colburn
- Publication date: 1813
- Publication place: United Kingdom
- Media type: Print

Memoirs of Sir Joshua Reynolds is an 1813 biography written by the British artist James Northcote about his fellow painter and the first President of the Royal Academy Sir Joshua Reynolds (1723–1792). It was published by Henry Colburn. Its release coincided with a major exhibition of the artist's work at the British Institution in Pall Mall. An earlier biography of Reynolds had been written by Edmund Malone in 1797. In 1819 Northcote brought out an extended two volume version, featuring further anecdotes about Reynolds.

== Bibliography ==
- Hamilton, James. Constable: A Portrait. Hachette UK, 2022.
- Junod, Karen. Writing the Lives of Painters: Biography and Artistic Identity in Britain 1760-1810. OUP Oxford, 2011.
- Postle, Edward (ed.) Joshua Reynolds: The Creation of Celebrity. Harry N. Abrams, 2005.
