= Portrait of John Ruskin (Northcote) =

Painting by James Northcote

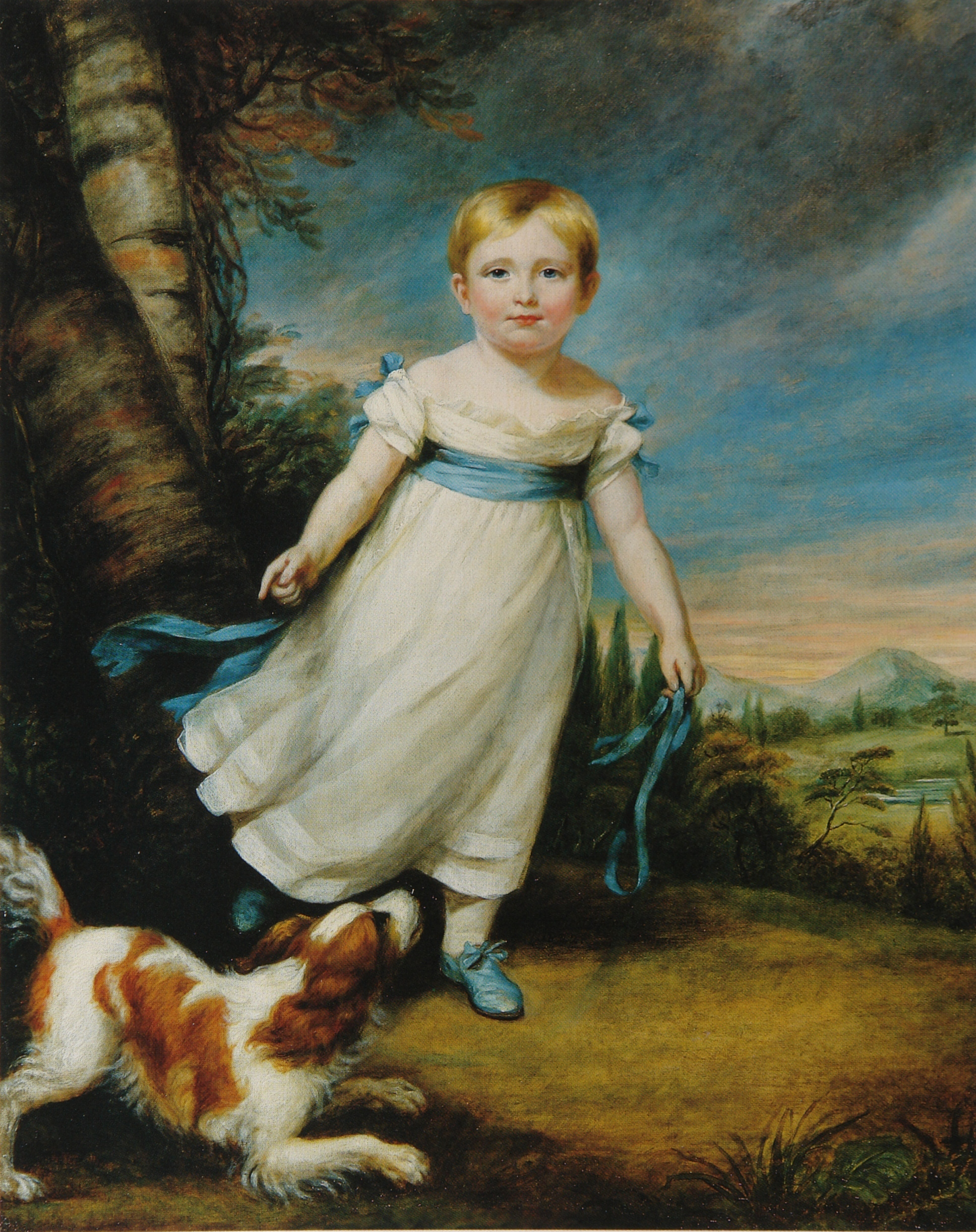
- Artist: James Northcote
- Year: 1822
- Type: Oil on linen, portrait painting
- Dimensions: 126.7 cm × 101 cm (49.9 in × 40 in)
- Location: Brantwood, Cumbria

Portrait of John Ruskin is an oil on linen portrait painting by the British artist James Northcote, from 1822. It depicts the future art critic John Ruskin at the age of three and a half. He is shown with a King Charles Spaniel, likely a family pet. Ruskin would go on to be an influential art theorist who championed the work of Turner and the Pre-Raphaelites.

Northcote was a protégée of Joshua Reynolds and was a prominent member of the Royal Academy during the Regency era. The painting was commissioned by Ruskin's father, and was based on sittings at Northcote's London studio in Argyll Street. It remained in Ruskin's possession throughout his lifetime and hung in the dining room at his home Brantwood by Coniston Water. It was acquired by the National Portrait Gallery in 1988 but sent out on permanent loan to Brantwood, which now serves as a museum.

== Bibliography ==
- Dearden, James S. John Ruskin: A Life in Pictures. Sheffield Academic Press, 1999.
- Hewison, Robert, Warrell, Ian, & Wildman, Stephen. Ruskin, Turner and the Pre-Raphaelites. Tate Gallery, 2000.
