= James Northcote =

English painter (1746–1831)

James Northcote RA
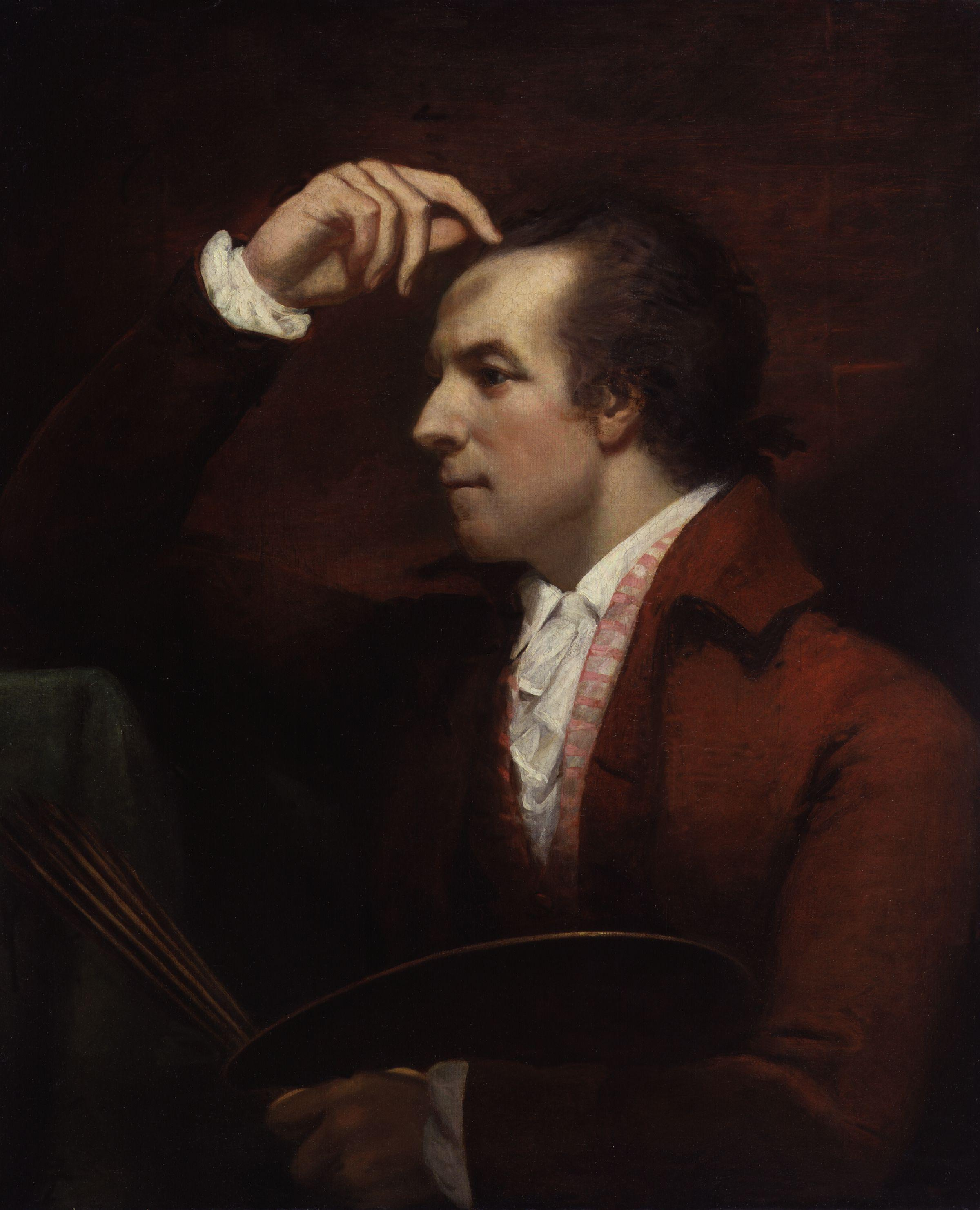
- Self-portrait, 1784
- Born: 22 October 1746; Plymouth, Devon, England
- Died: 13 July 1831 (aged 84); London, England

James Northcote RA (22 October 1746 – 13 July 1831) was a British painter. He became a member of the Royal Academy in 1787, and a member of the Royal Institute of the Netherlands in 1809.

== Life and work ==
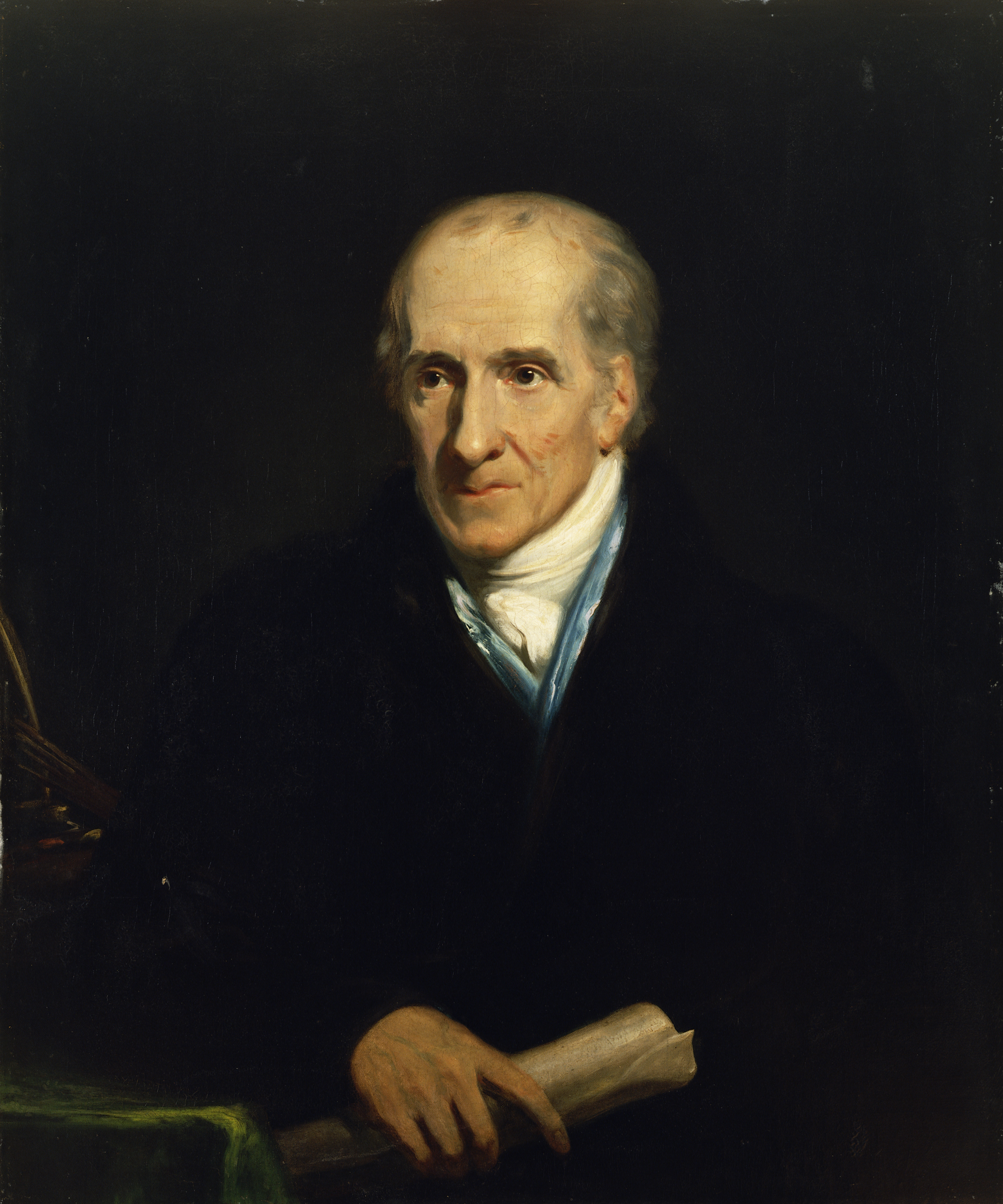
A portrait of Northcote painted by James Ramsay between 1823 and 1825, from the collection of the Royal Albert Memorial Museum, Exeter.

Northcote was born in Plymouth, and was apprenticed to his father, Samuel Northcote, a watchmaker. In his spare time, he drew and painted. In 1769 he left his father's work and set up as a portrait painter. Four years later he went to London and was admitted as a pupil into the studio and house of Sir Joshua Reynolds. At the same time he attended the Royal Academy Schools.

In May 1776, he left Reynolds' studio, and about two years later, having made some money by portrait painting back in Devon, he went to study in Italy. On his return to England, three years later, he revisited his native county, then settled in London, where John Opie and Henry Fuseli were his rivals. He was elected associate of the Academy in 1786, and full academician in the following spring. The Young Princes Murdered in the Tower, his first important work on a historical subject, dates from 1786, and it was followed by the Burial of the Princes in the Tower. Both paintings, along with seven others, were intended for Boydell's Shakespeare Gallery. His enormous Death of Wat Tyler was exhibited in 1787; commissioned by a London alderman, it hung in the Guildhall until its destruction during the Second World War.

Shortly afterwards Northcote began a set of ten subjects, entitled "The Modest Girl and the Wanton", which were completed and engraved in 1796. Among the productions of Northcote's later years are the Entombment and the Agony in the Garden, besides many portraits, and several animal subjects, such as Leopards, Dog and Heron, and Lion; these were more successful than the artist's attempts at more elevated subjects, as was indicated by Fuseli's caustic remark on examining the Angel opposing Balaam —"Northcote, you are an angel at an ass, but an ass at an angel." Northcote's works number about 2000, and he made a fortune of £40,000.

He was elected to the Royal Academy in 1787. He became a corresponding member, living abroad, of the Royal Institute of the Netherlands in 1809. His Portrait of Marc Isambard Brunel was exhibited at the Royal Academy's Summer Exhibition in 1814 and is now in the National Portrait Gallery. He sponsored the admission in 1829 of Thomas Sewell Robins to the Royal Academy Schools.

In 1841, a monument to Northcote by Francis Chantrey was erected in Exeter Cathedral.

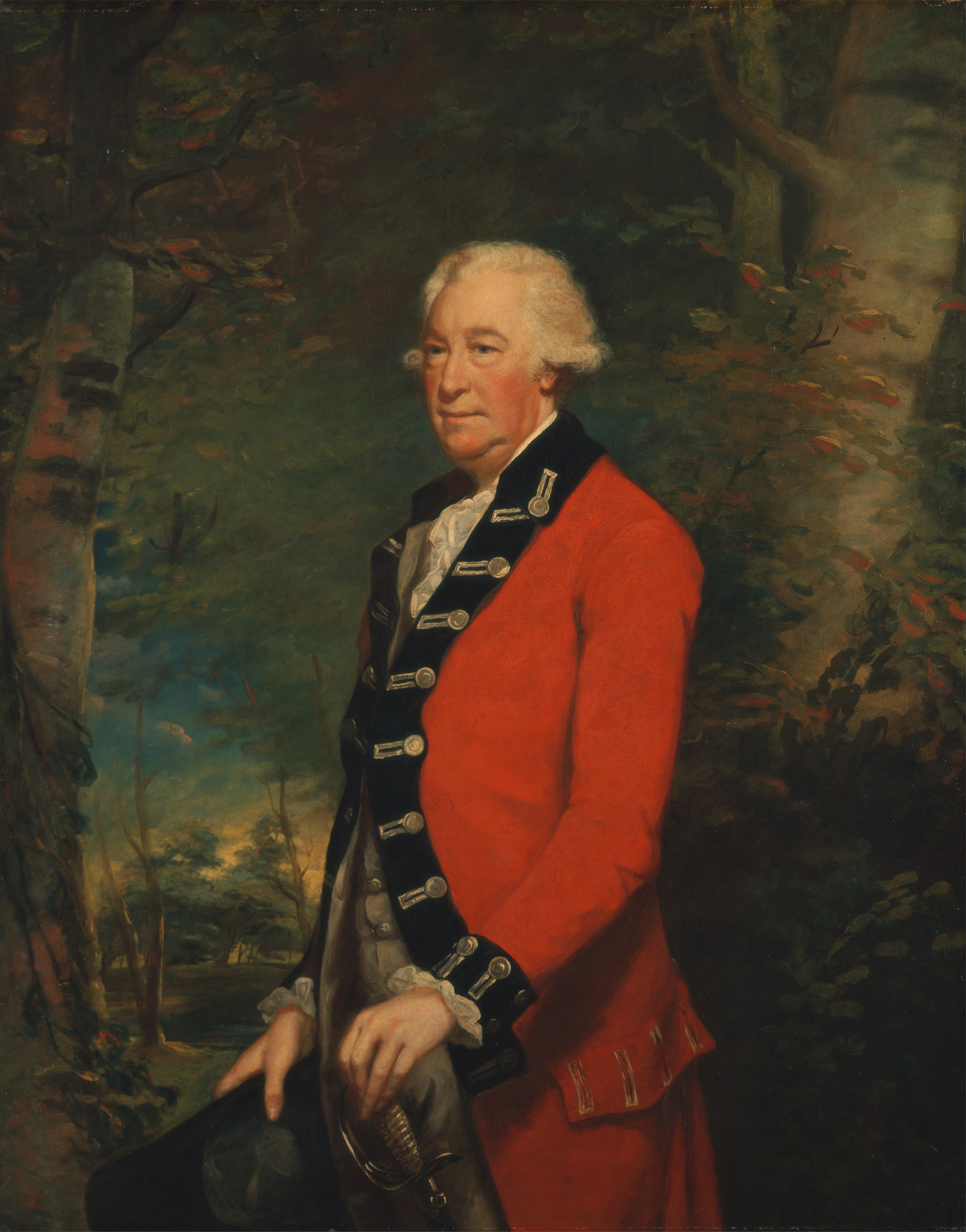
Portrait of Sir Ralph Milbanke, 1784

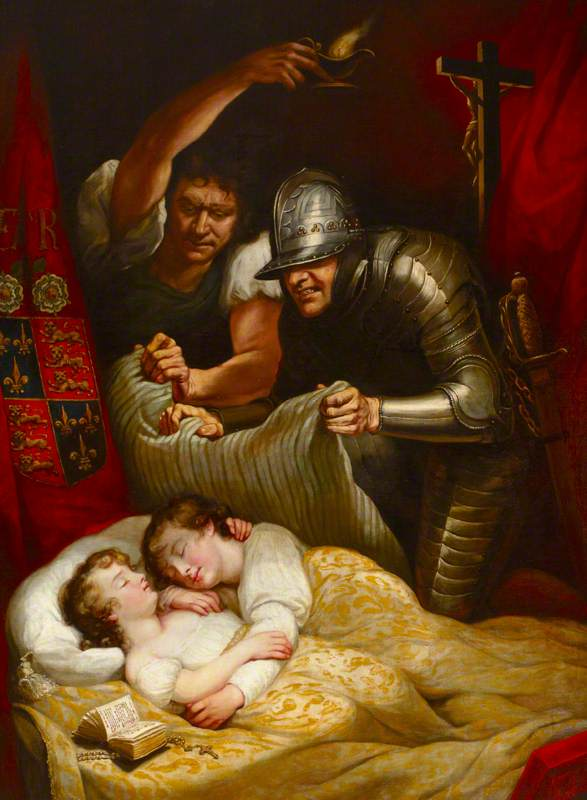
The Murder of the Princes in the Tower, 1786

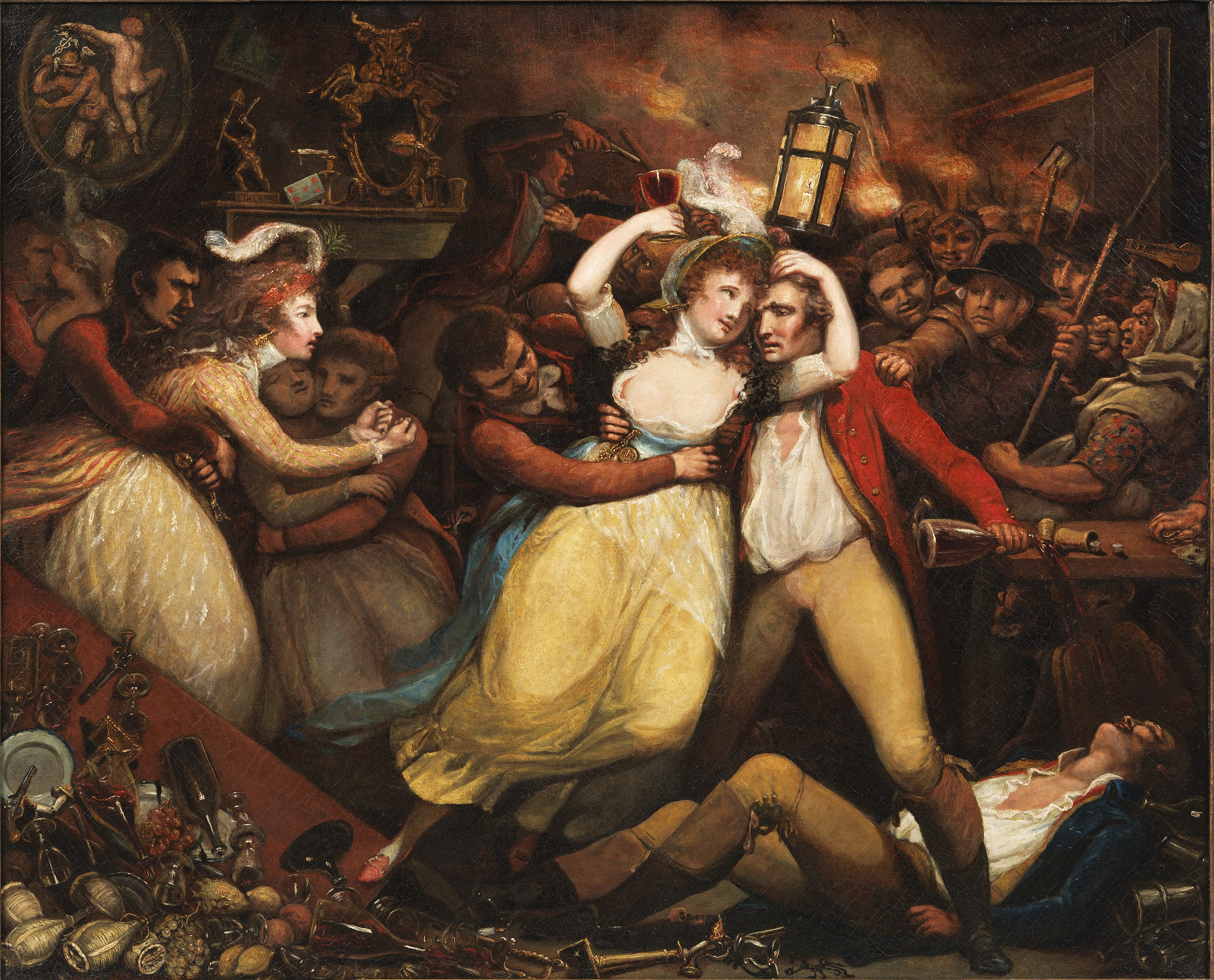
The Wanton Reveling with her companions, 1796

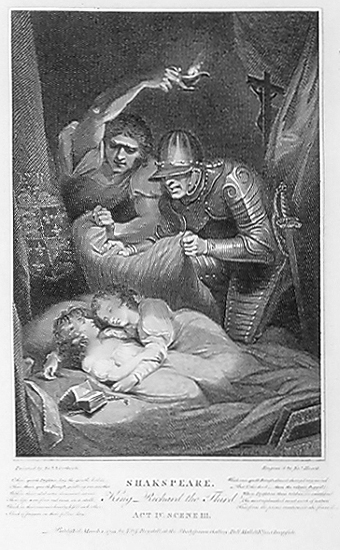
One of Northcote's illustrations to Shakespeare's Richard III

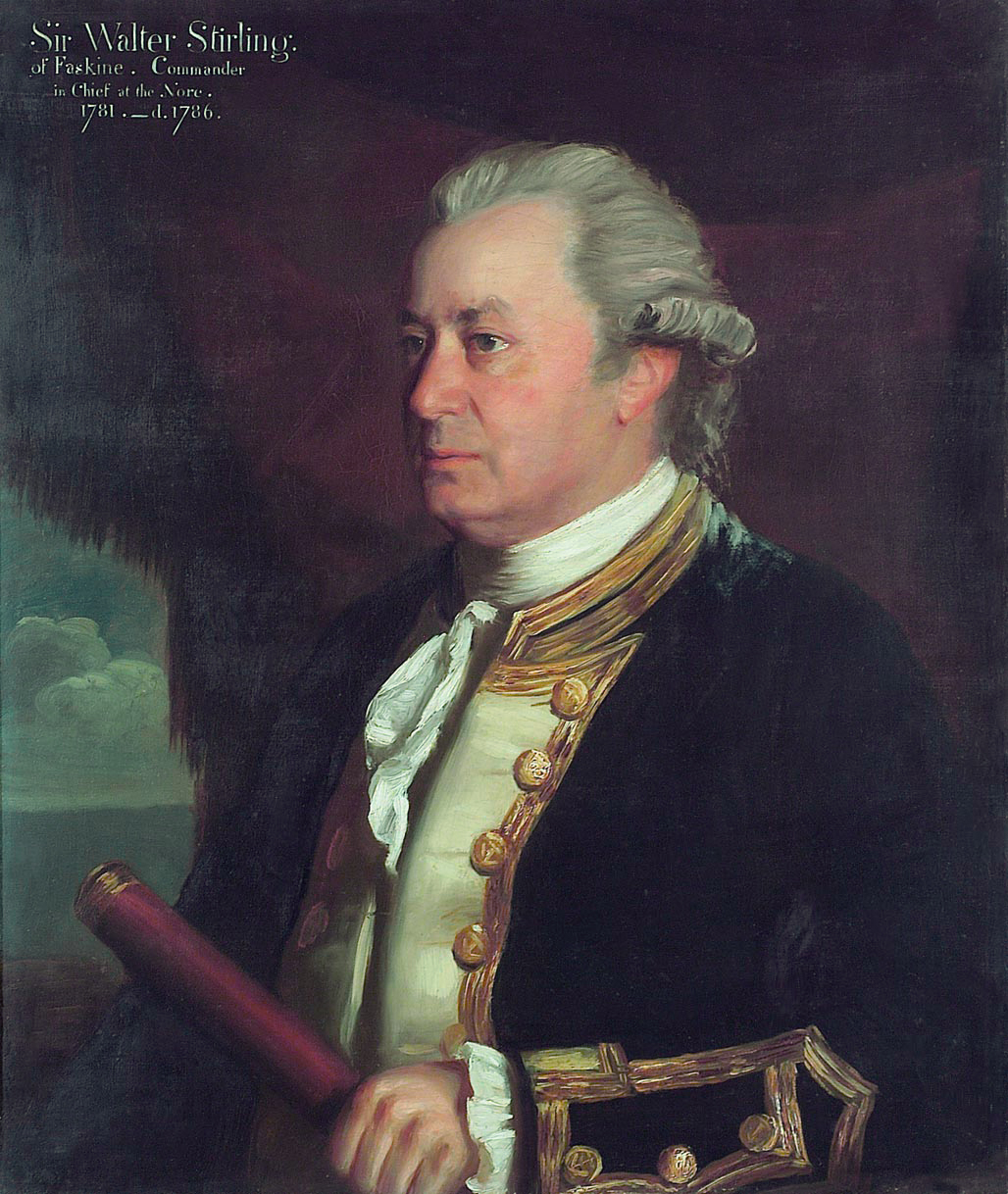
A portrait of Walter Stirling by Northcote

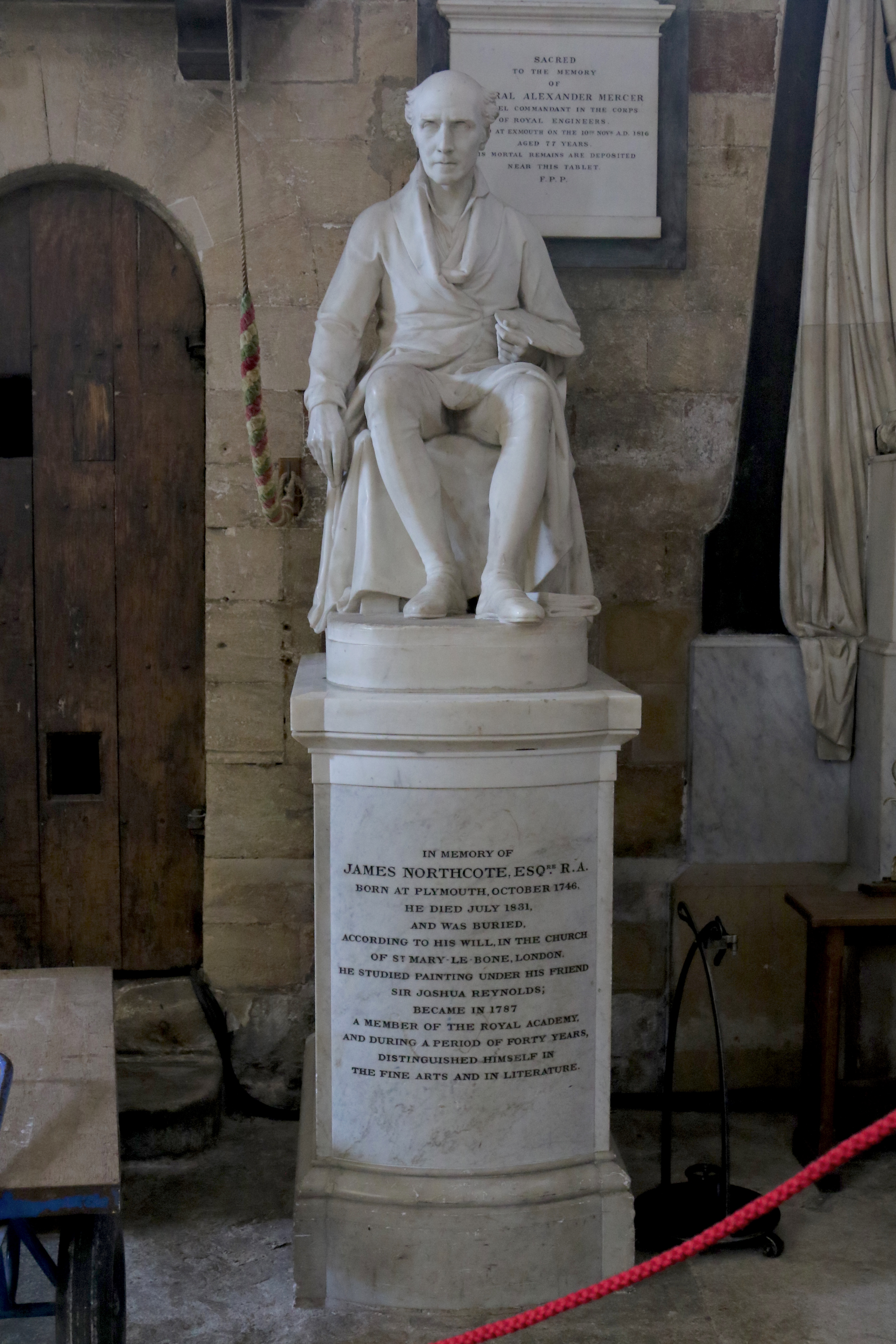
Memorial in Exeter Cathedral by Francis Chantrey

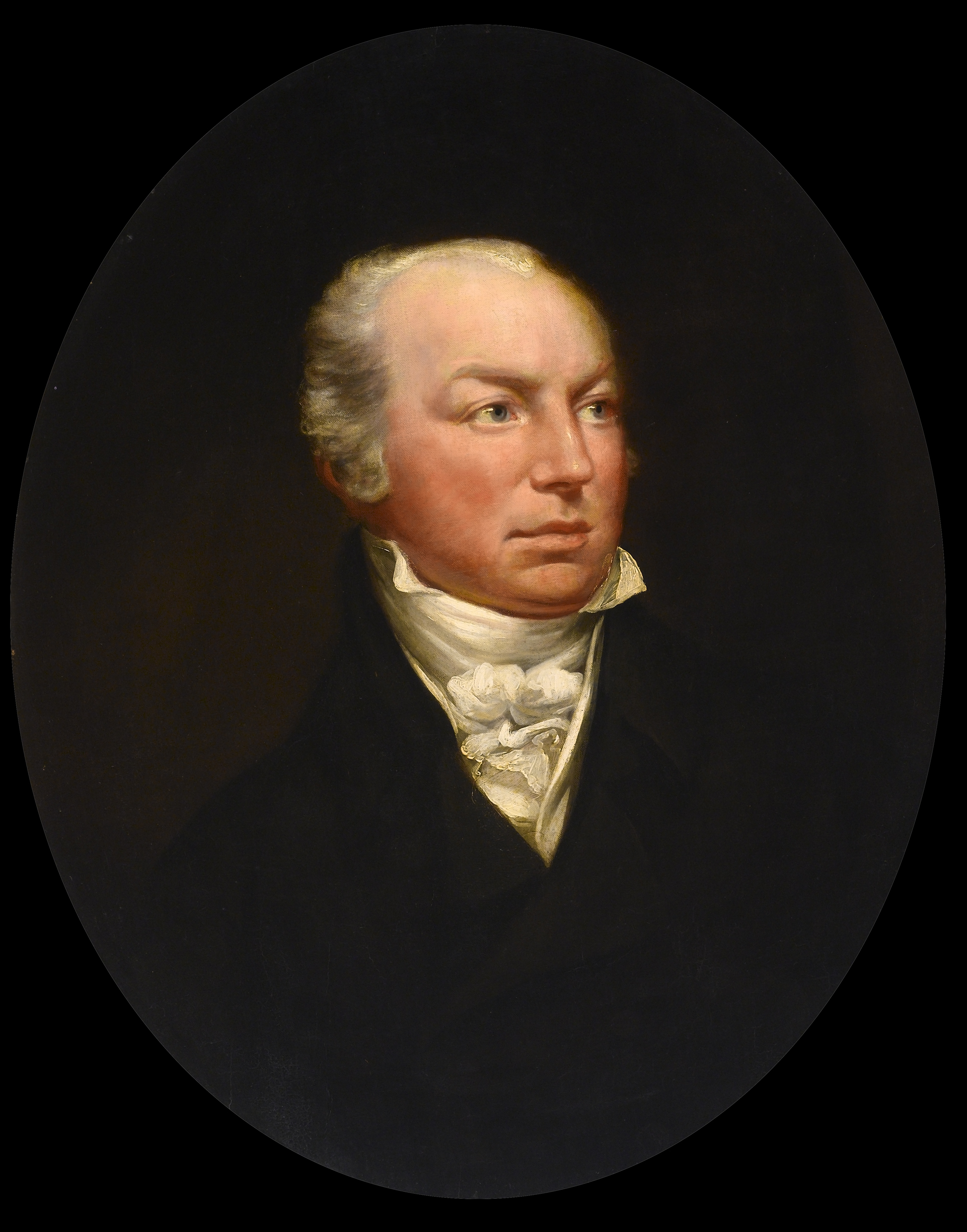
A portrait of Moses Hawkes by James Northcote

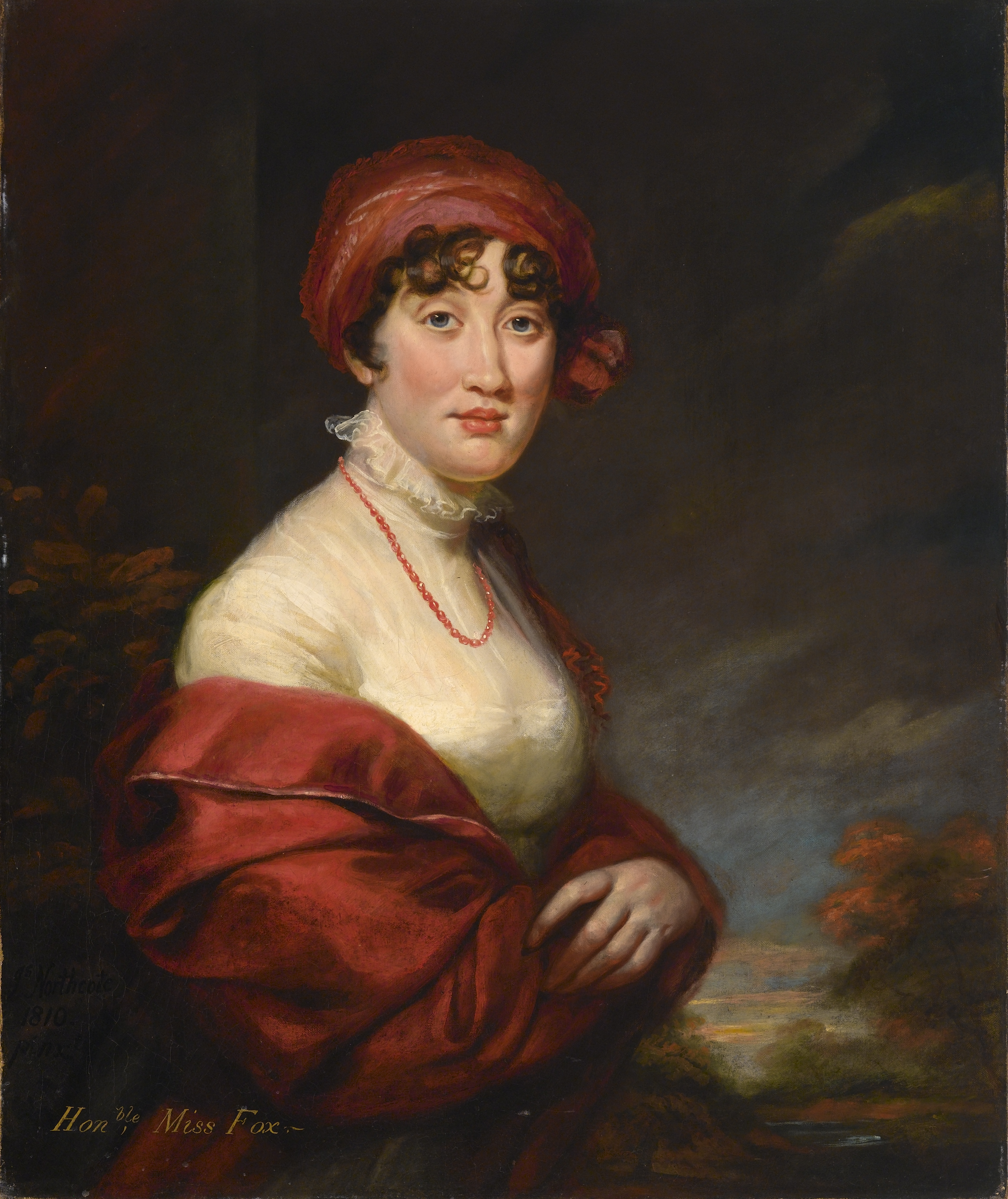
The Honourable Miss Fox - James Northcote, 1810

== Writings ==
Northcote also sought fame as an author, and his first essays were contributions to the Artist, edited by Prince Hoare. In 1813 he embodied his recollections of his old master in a biography Memoirs of Sir Joshua Reynolds. His Fables—the first series published in 1828, the second posthumously in 1833—were illustrated with woodcuts by Harvey from Northcote's own designs. In the production of his Life of Titian, his last work, which appeared in 1830, he was assisted by William Hazlitt, who previously, in 1826, had given to the public in the New Monthly Magazine his recollections of Northcote's pungent and cynical "conversations", causing some problems for the painter and his friends.

== Gallery ==
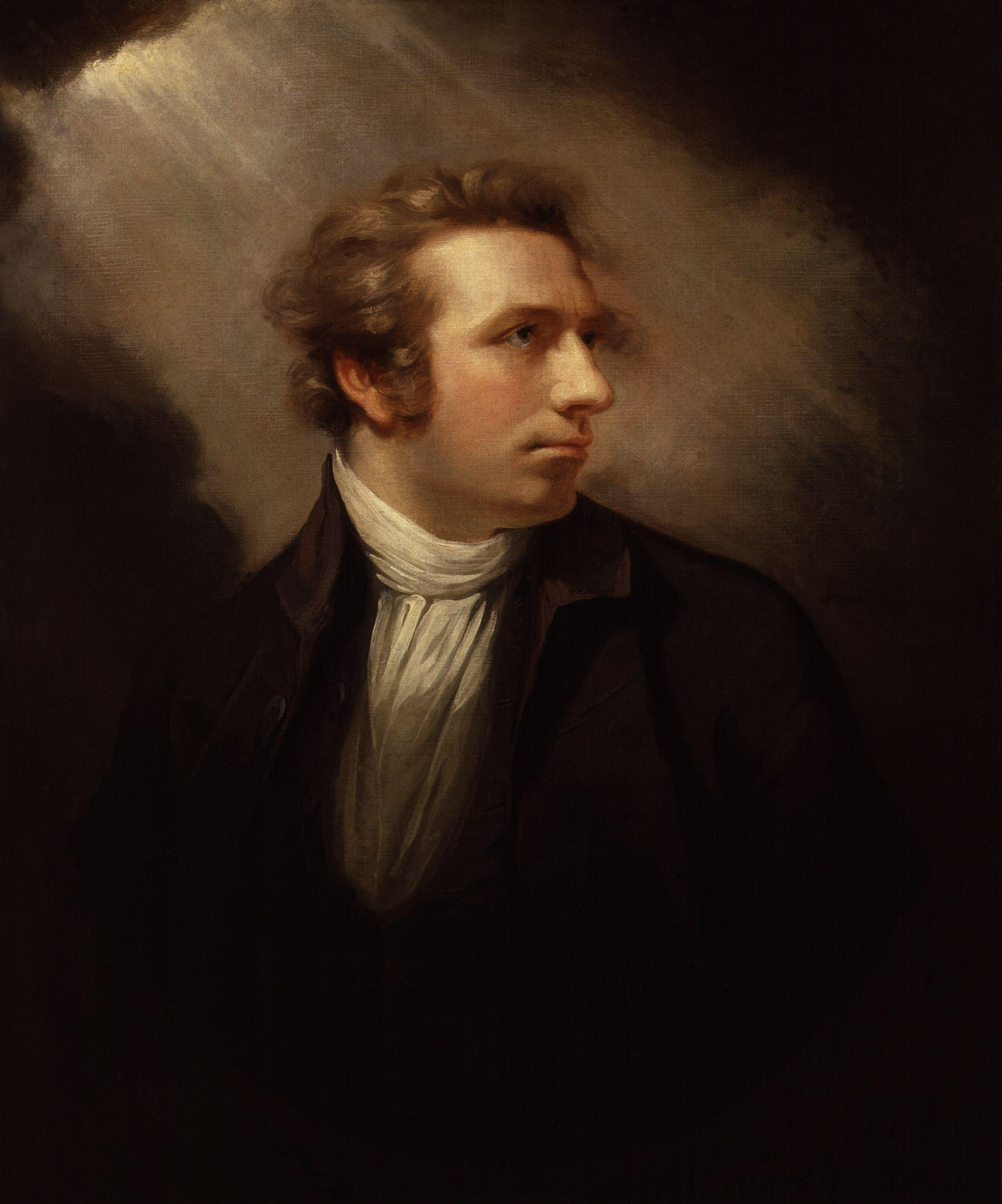
Portrait of Henry Fuseli, 1778

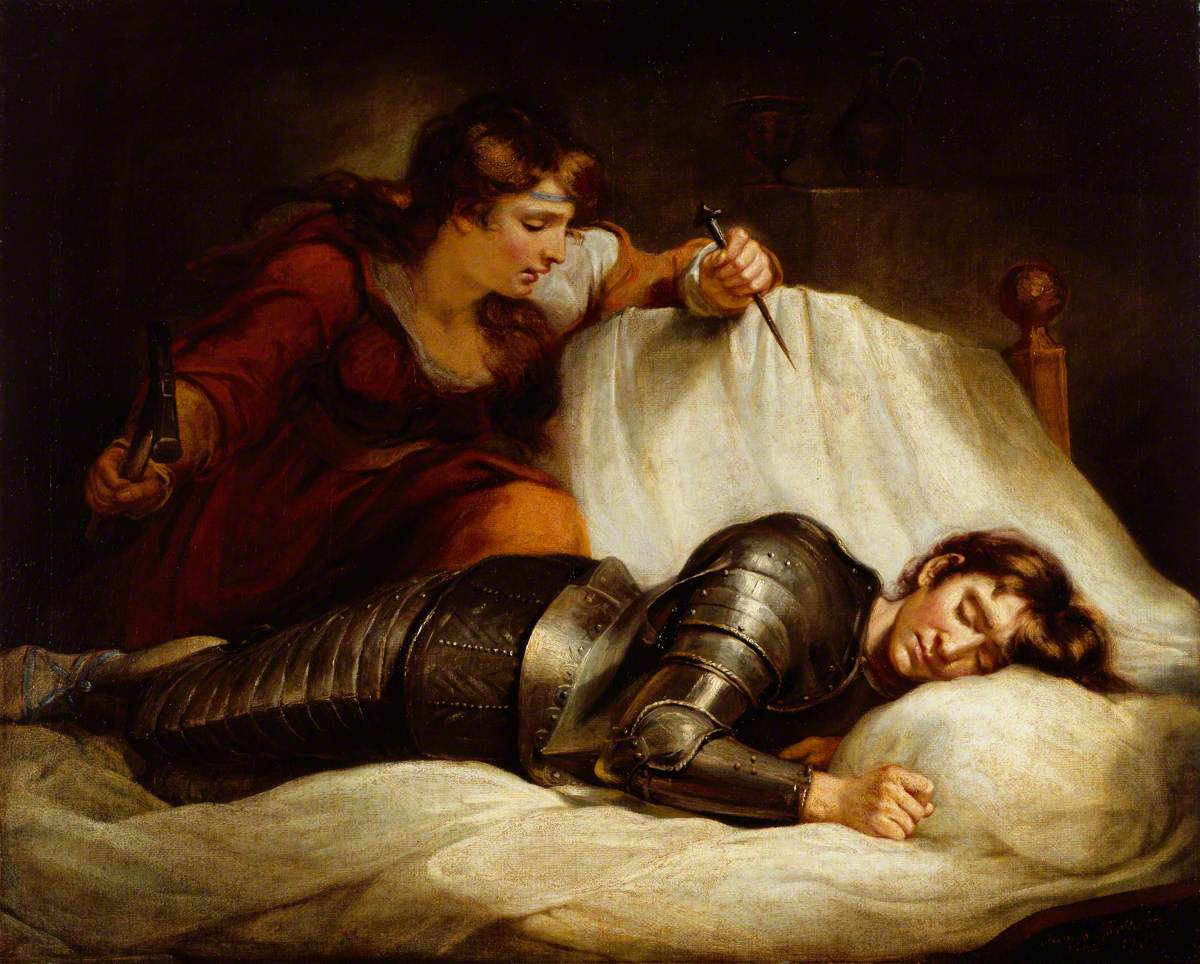
Jael and Sisera, 1787

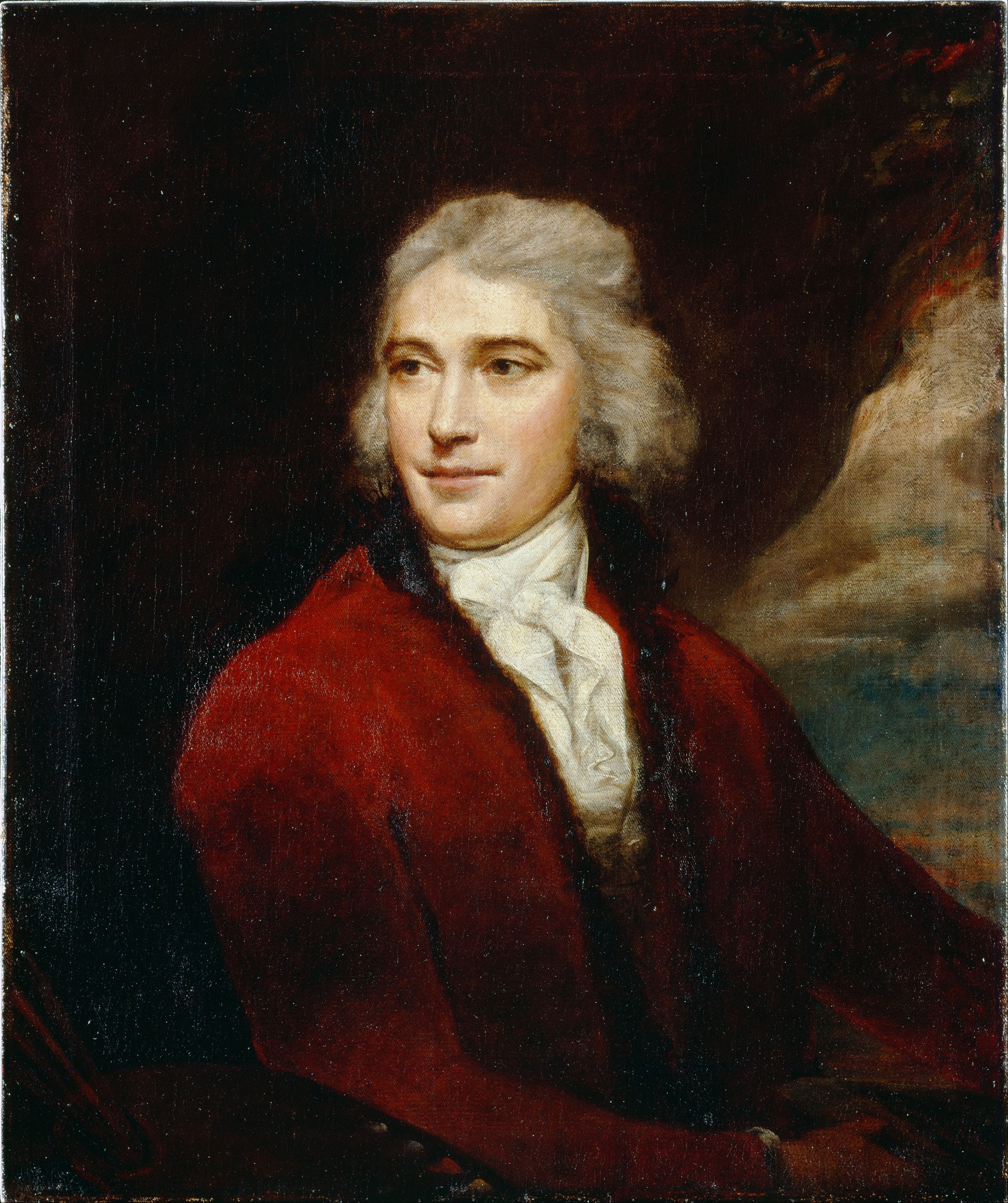
Francis Bourgeois, c.1794

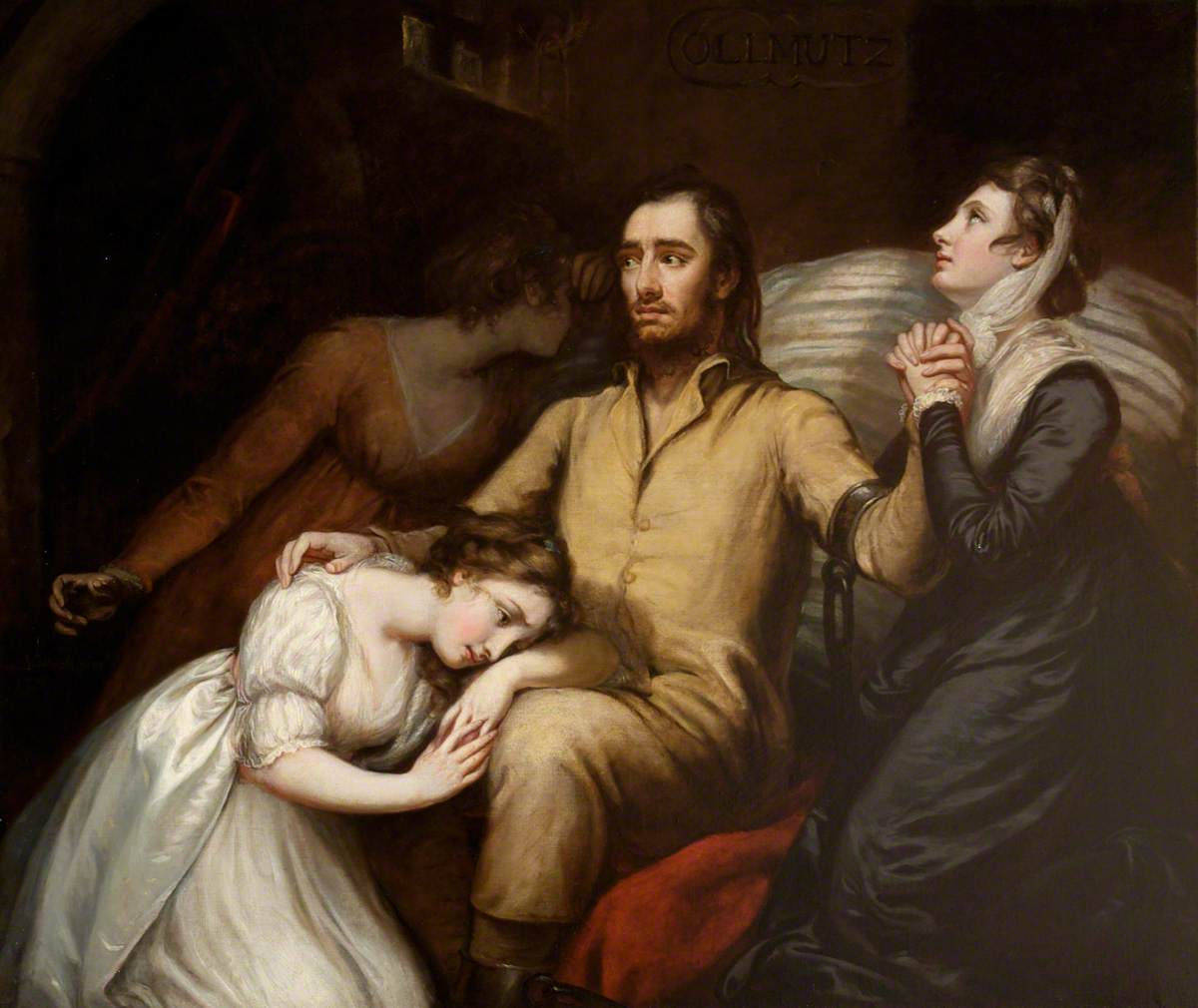
Lafayette in the Dungeon of Olmütz, 1797

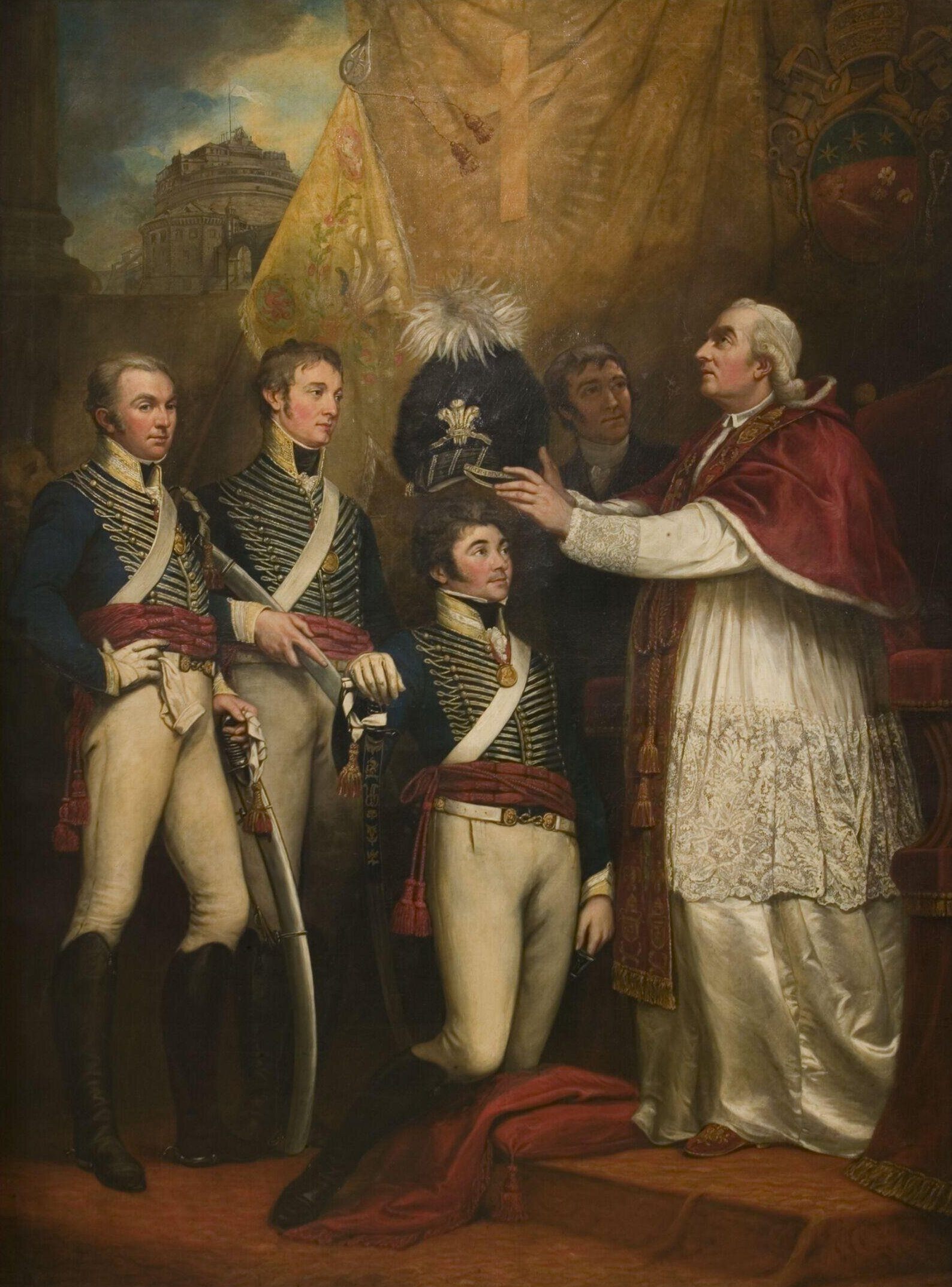
The Presentation of British Officers to Pope Pius VI, 1794, 1800

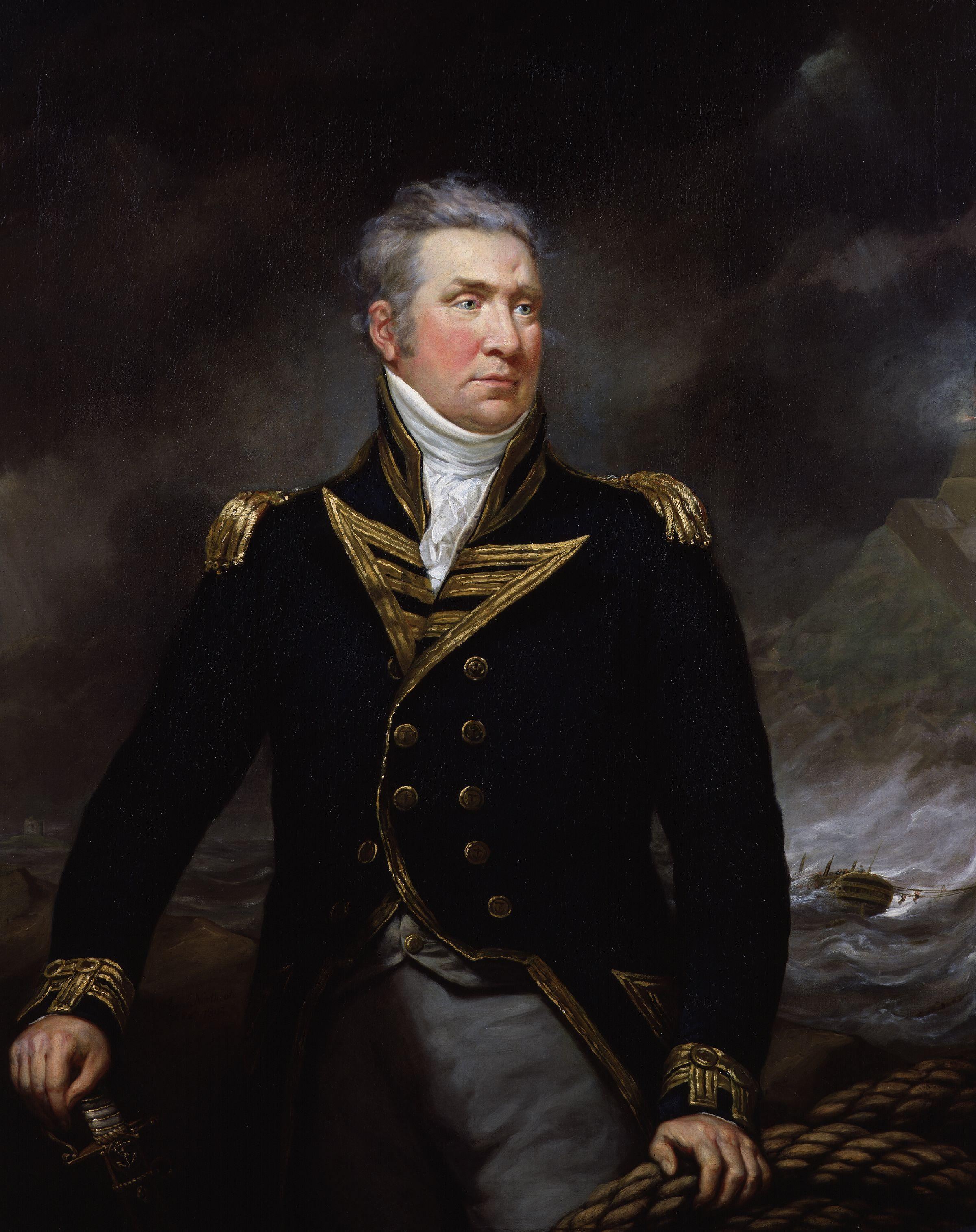
Edward Pellew, 1804

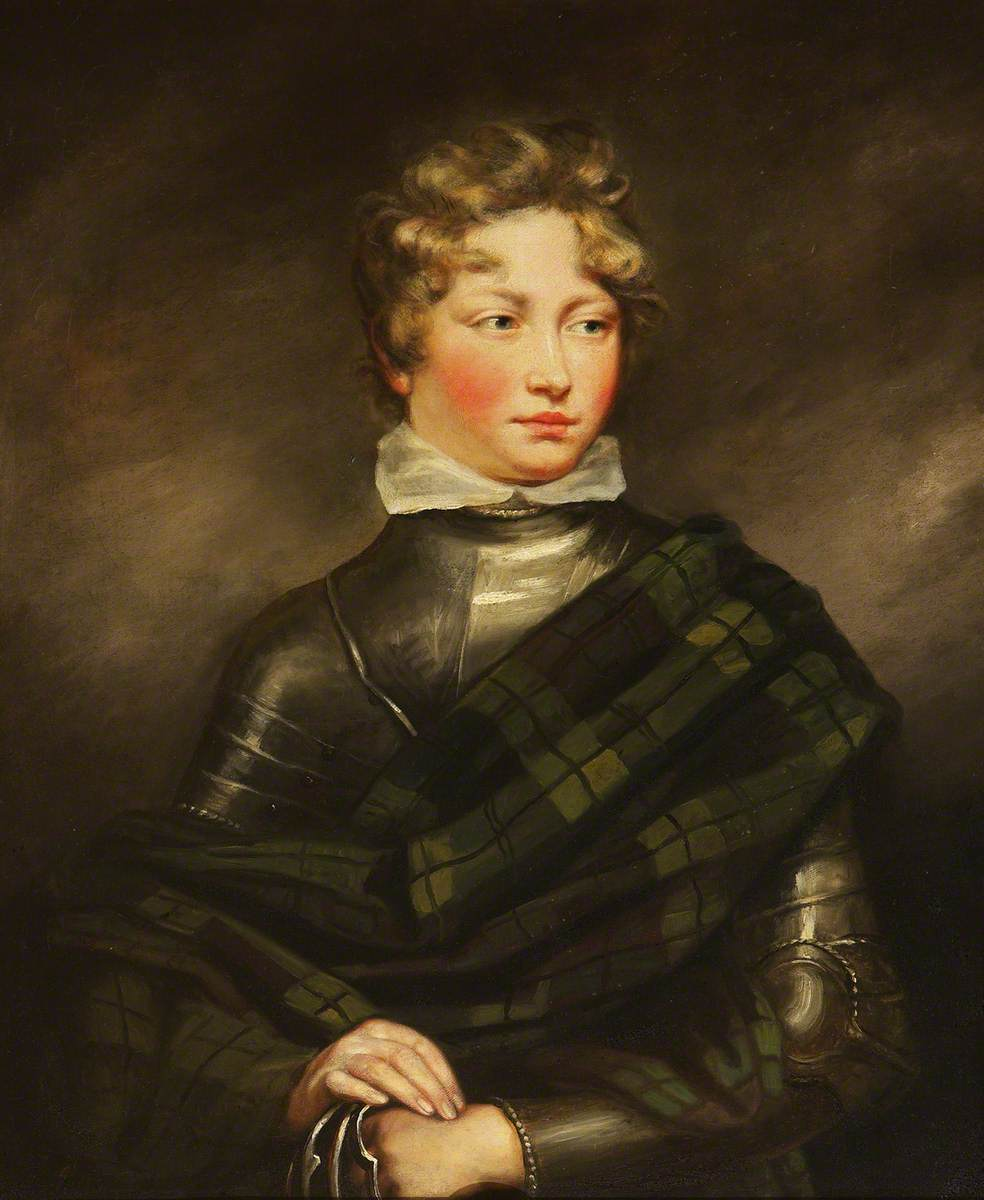
Master Betty, 1804

Francis Burdett, 1810

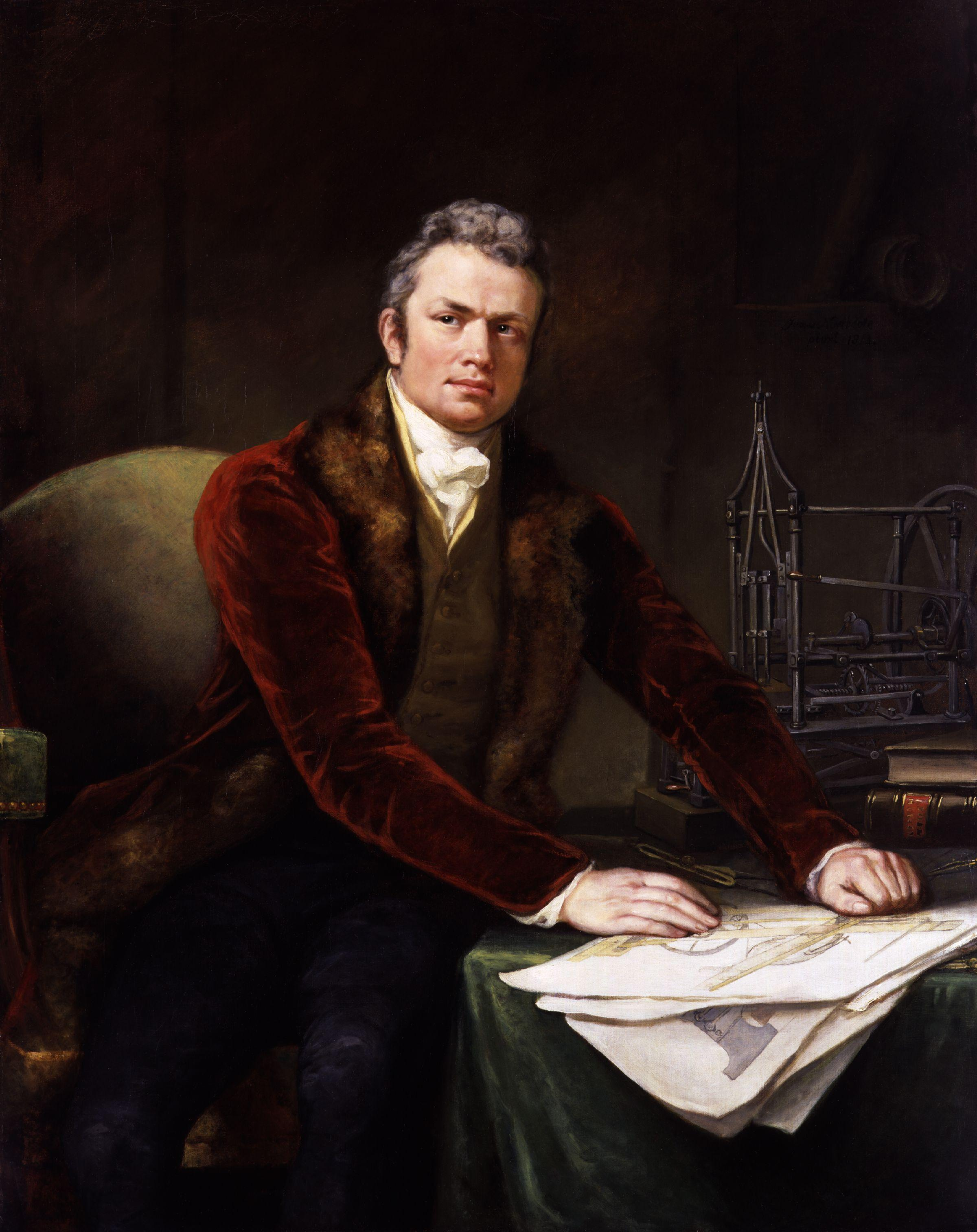
Portrait of Marc Isambard Brunel, 1813

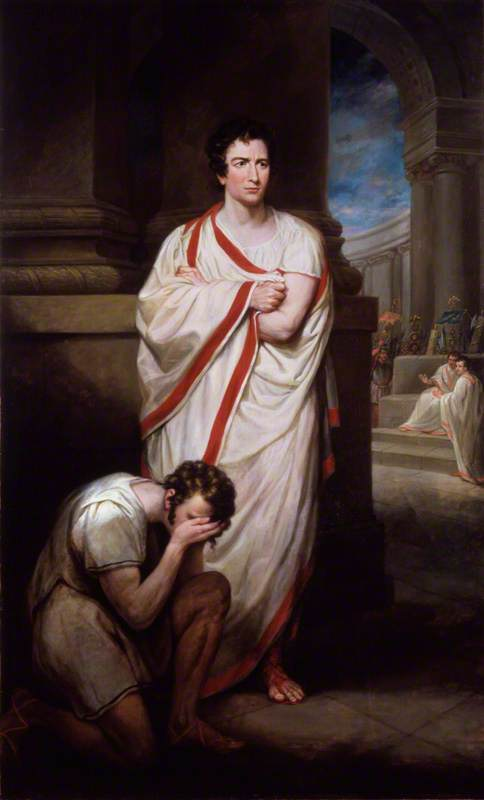
Edmund Kean as Brutus, 1819

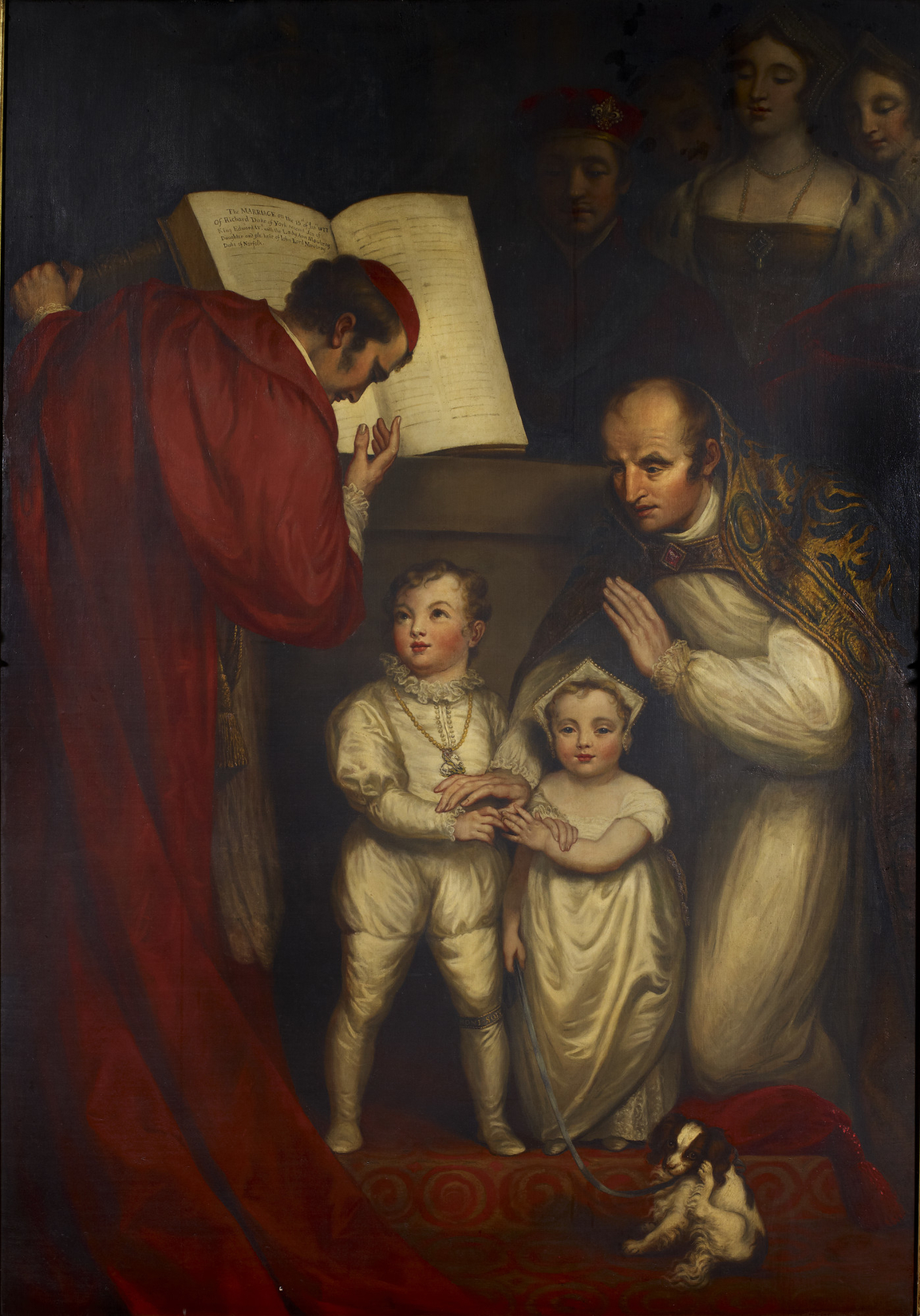
The Marriage of Richard, Duke of York, 1821

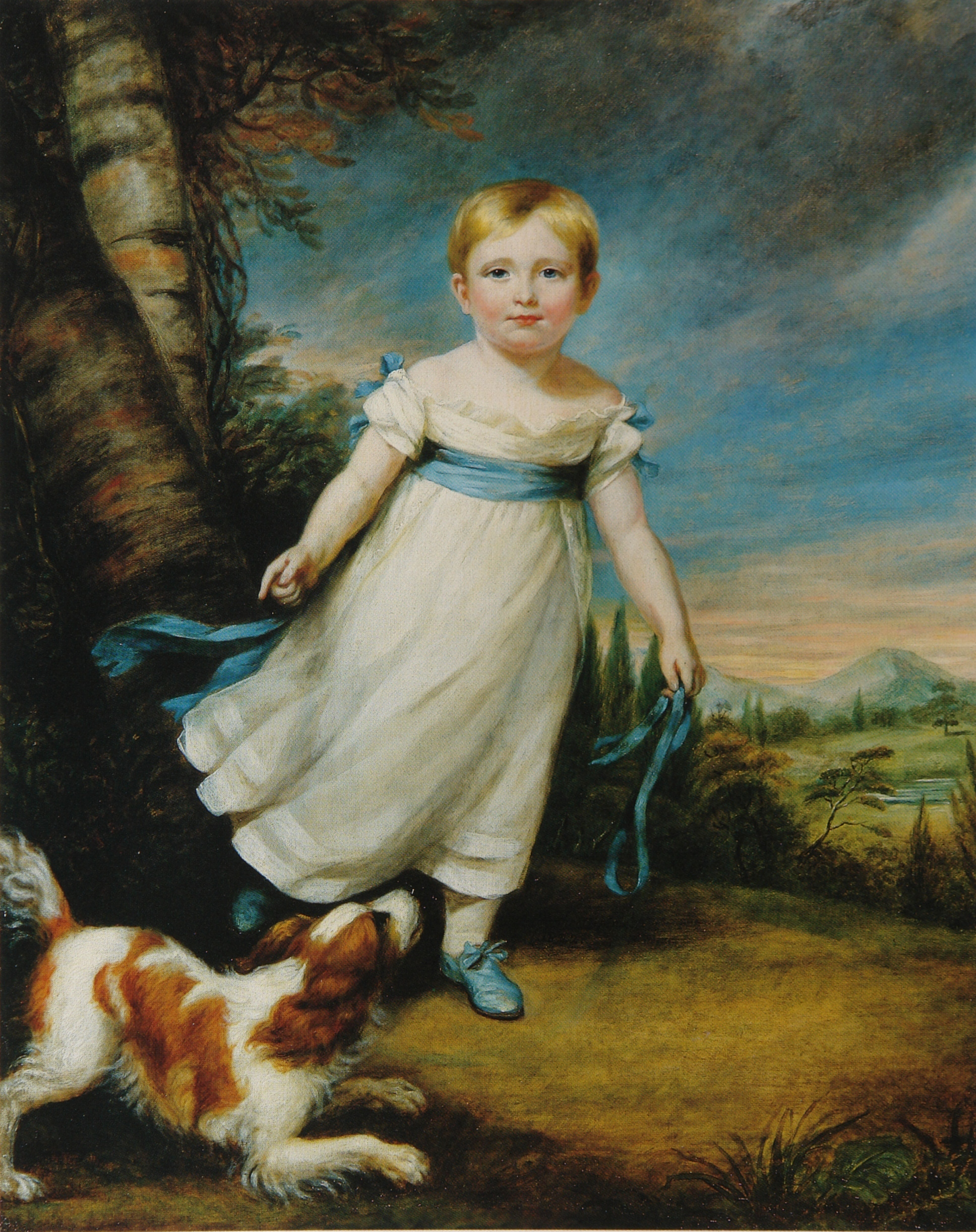
Portrait of John Ruskin, 1822

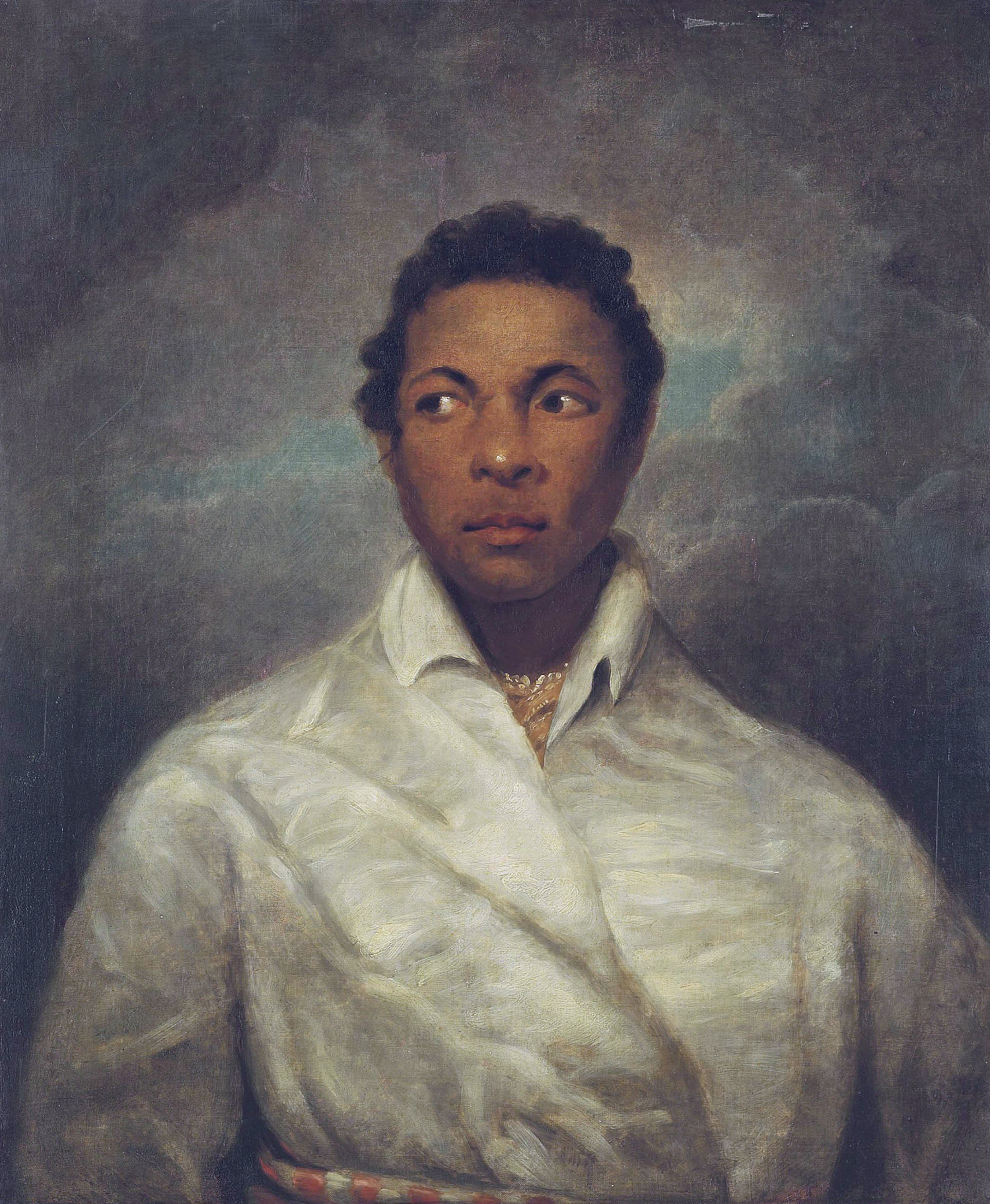
Ira Aldridge as Othello, 1826

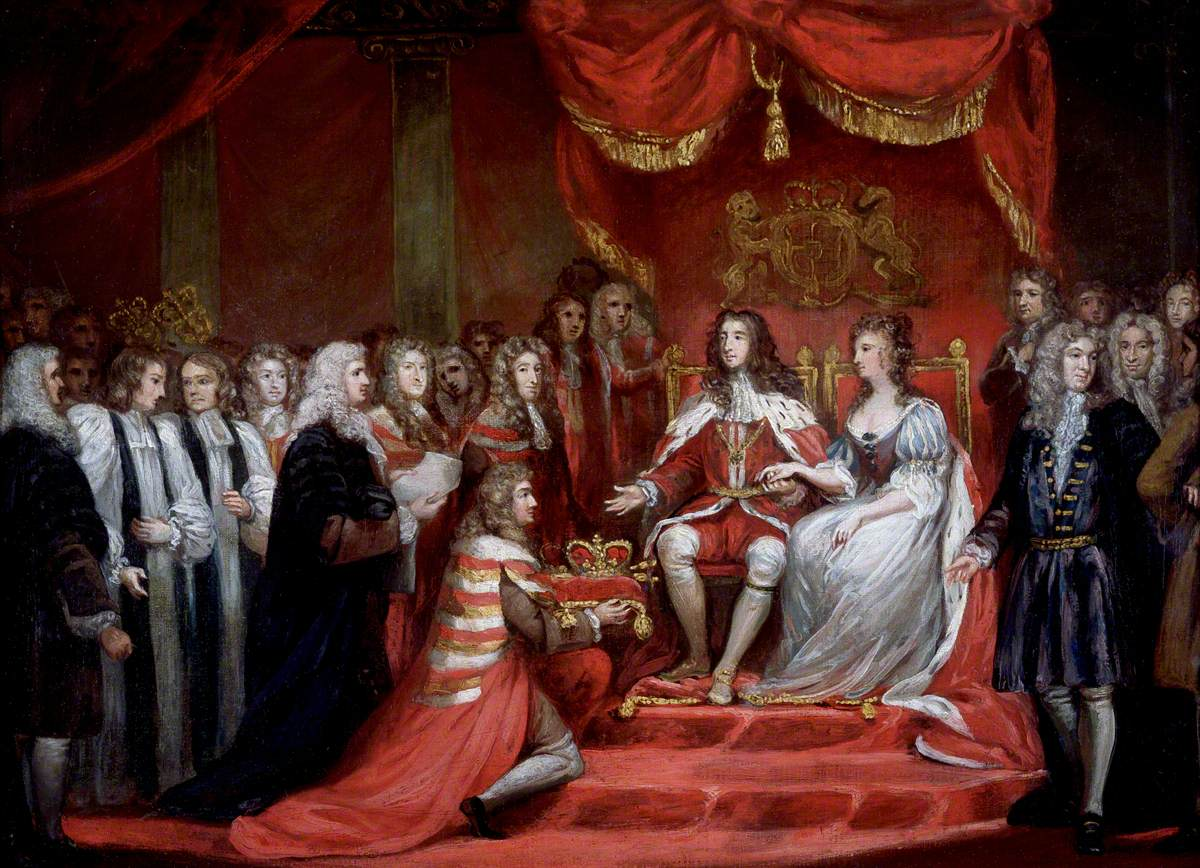
The Bill of Rights, 1688, 1827
