= History painting =

Genre in painting defined by narrative subjects

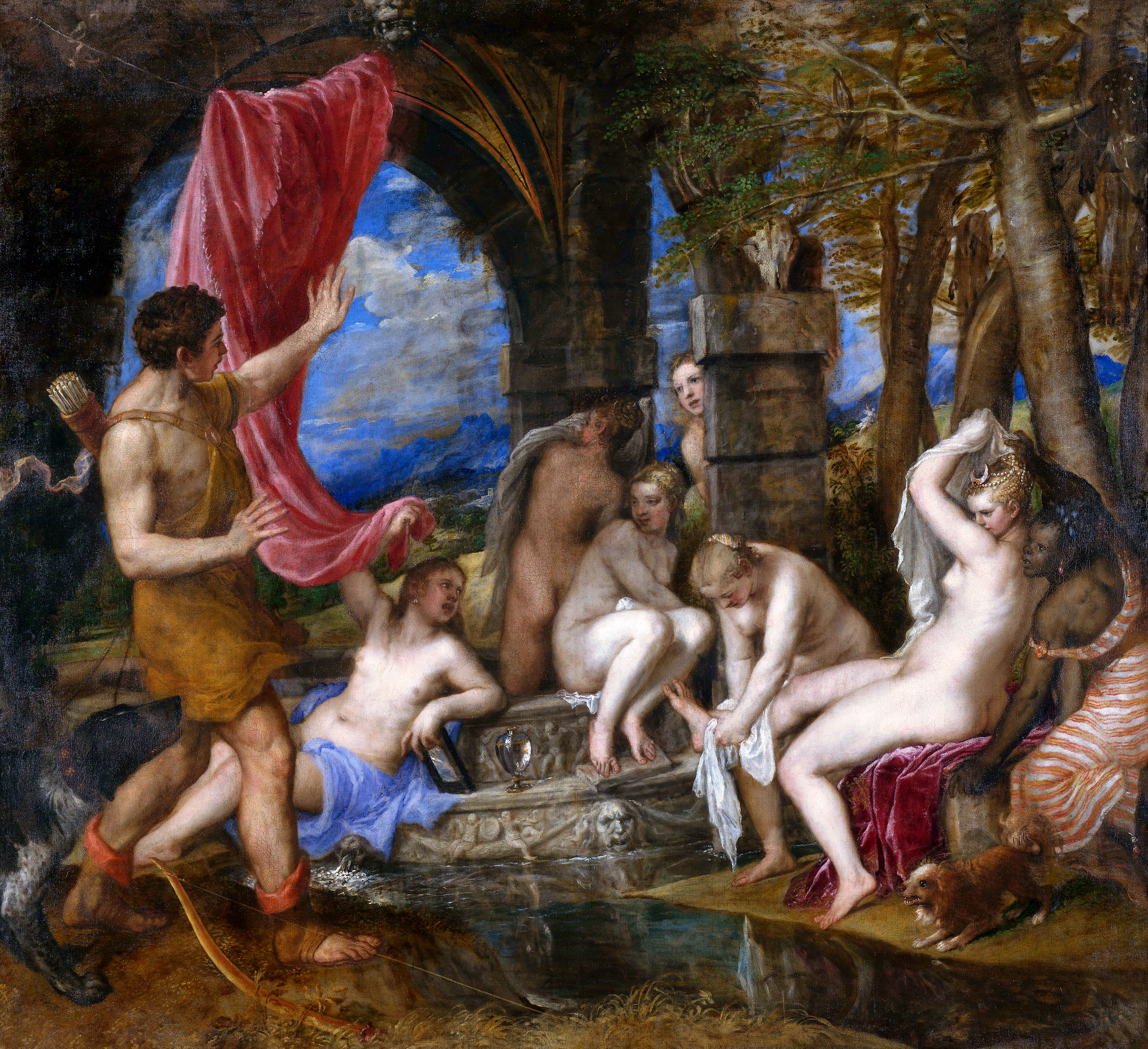
Diana and Actaeon, Titian, 1556–1559, a classic history painting, showing a dramatic moment in a mythological story, with elements of figure painting, landscape painting and still-life.

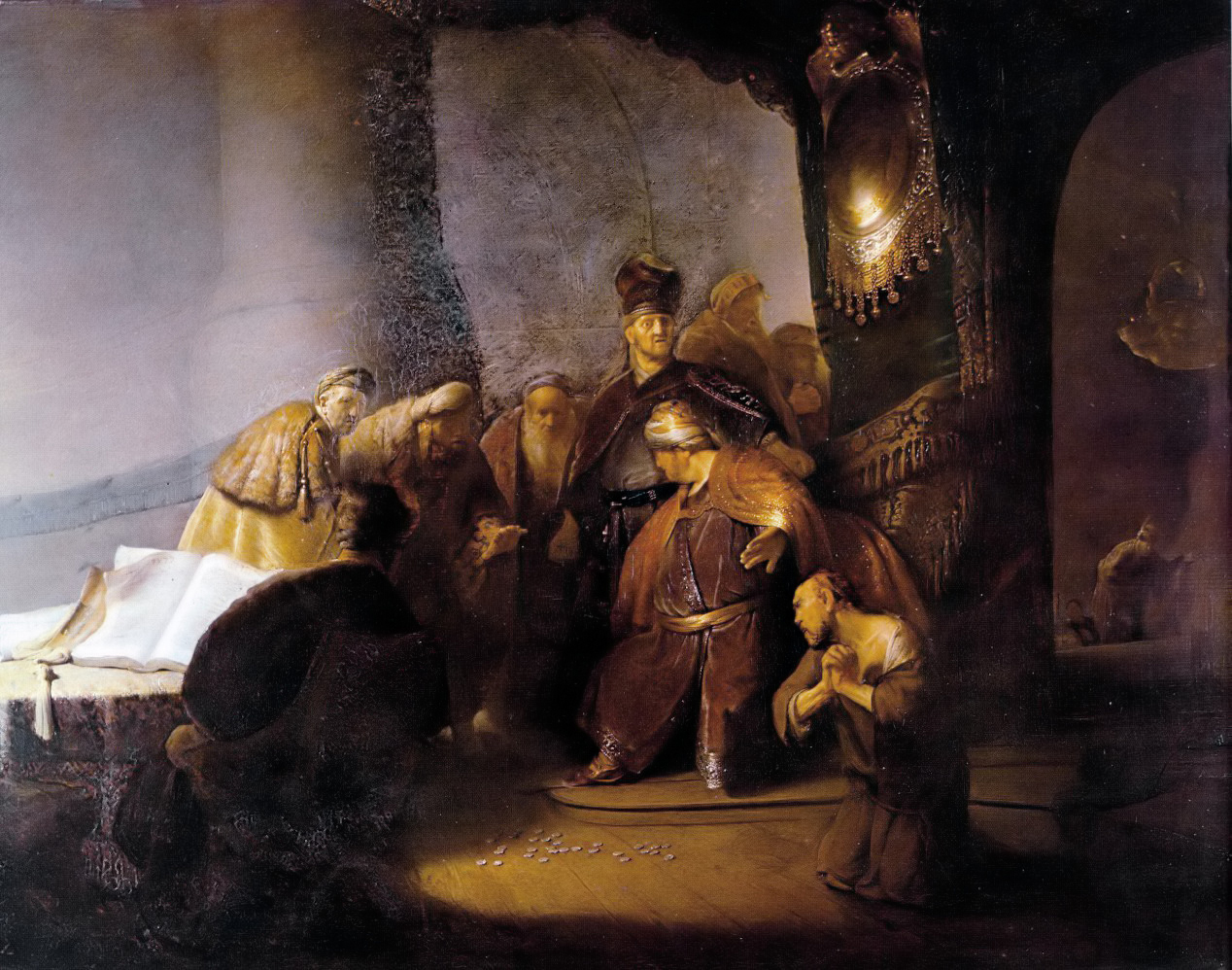
Judas Returning the Thirty Silver Pieces by Rembrandt, 1629.

History painting is a genre in painting defined by its subject matter rather than any artistic style or specific period. History paintings depict a moment in a narrative story, most often (but not exclusively) Greek and Roman mythology and Bible stories, opposed to a specific and static subject, as in portrait, still life, and landscape painting. The term is derived from the wider senses of the word historia in Latin and histoire in French, meaning "story" or "narrative", and essentially means "story painting". Most history paintings are not of scenes from history, especially paintings from before about 1850.

In modern English, "historical painting" is sometimes used to describe the painting of scenes from history in its narrower sense, especially for 19th-century art, excluding religious, mythological, and allegorical subjects, which are included in the broader term "history painting", and before the 19th century were the most common subjects for history paintings.

History paintings almost always contain a number of figures, often a large number, and normally show some typical states on that is a moment in a narrative. The genre includes depictions of moments in religious narratives, above all the Life of Christ, Middle Eastern culture as well as narrative scenes from mythology, and also allegorical scenes. These groups were for long the most frequently painted; works such as Michelangelo's Sistine Chapel ceiling are therefore history paintings, as are most very large paintings before the 19th century. The term covers large paintings in oil on canvas or fresco produced between the Renaissance and the late 19th century, after which the term is generally not used even for the many works that still meet the basic definition.

History painting may be used interchangeably with historical painting, and was especially so used before the 20th century. Where a distinction is made, "historical painting" is the painting of scenes from secular history, whether specific episodes or generalized scenes. In the 19th century, historical painting in this sense became a distinct genre. In phrases such as "historical painting materials", "historical" means in use before about 1900, or some earlier date.

== Prestige ==
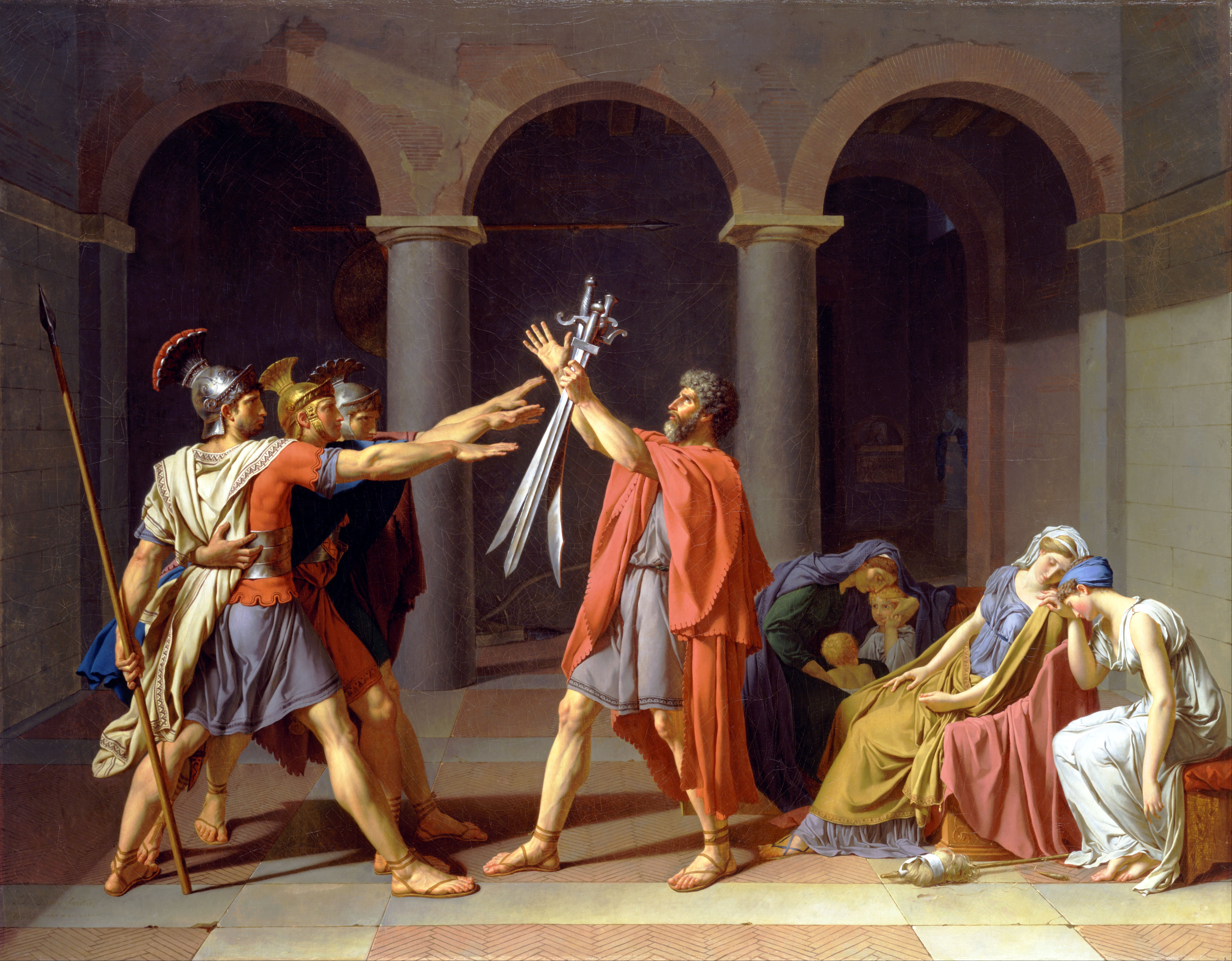
Jacques-Louis David's Oath of the Horatii, 1786, with a scene from ancient history.

History paintings were traditionally regarded as the highest form of Western painting, occupying the most prestigious place in the hierarchy of genres, and considered the equivalent to the epic in literature. In his De Pictura of 1436, Leon Battista Alberti had argued that multi-figure history painting was the noblest form of art, as being the most difficult, which required mastery of all the others, because it was a visual form of history, and because it had the greatest potential to move the viewer. He placed emphasis on the ability to depict the interactions between the figures by gesture and expression.

This view remained general until the 19th century, when artistic movements began to struggle against the establishment institutions of academic art, which continued to adhere to it. At the same time, there was from the latter part of the 18th century an increased interest in depicting in the form of history painting moments of drama from recent or contemporary history, which had long largely been confined to battle-scenes and scenes of formal surrenders and the like. Scenes from ancient history had been popular in the early Renaissance, and once again became common in the Baroque and Rococo periods, and still more so with the rise of Neoclassicism. In some 19th or 20th century contexts, the term may refer specifically to paintings of scenes from secular history, rather than those from religious narratives, literature or mythology.

== Development ==
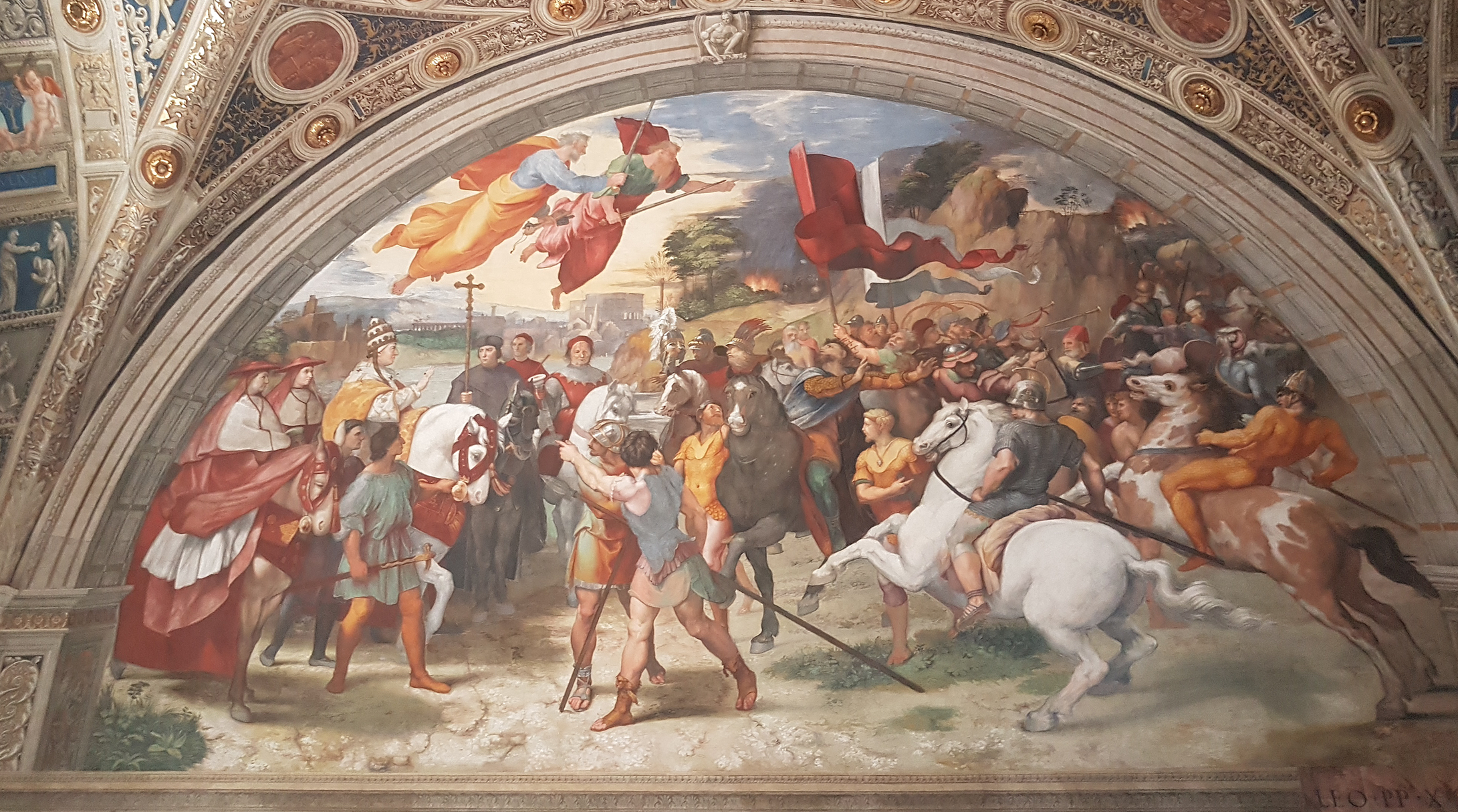
The Meeting of Leo the Great and Attila by Raphael and his workshop, 1513–14

The term is generally not used in art history in speaking of medieval painting, although the Western tradition was developing in large altarpieces, fresco cycles, and other works, as well as miniatures in illuminated manuscripts. It comes to the fore in Italian Renaissance painting, where a series of increasingly ambitious works were produced, many still religious, but several, especially in Florence, which did actually feature near-contemporary historical scenes such as the set of three huge canvases on The Battle of San Romano by Paolo Uccello, the abortive Battle of Cascina by Michelangelo and the Battle of Anghiari by Leonardo da Vinci, neither of which were completed. Scenes from ancient history and mythology were also popular. Writers such as Alberti and the following century Giorgio Vasari in his Lives of the Artists, followed public and artistic opinion in judging the best painters above all on their production of large works of history painting (though in fact the only modern (post-classical) work described in De Pictura is Giotto's huge Navicella in mosaic). Artists continued for centuries to strive to make their reputation by producing such works, often neglecting genres to which their talents were better suited.

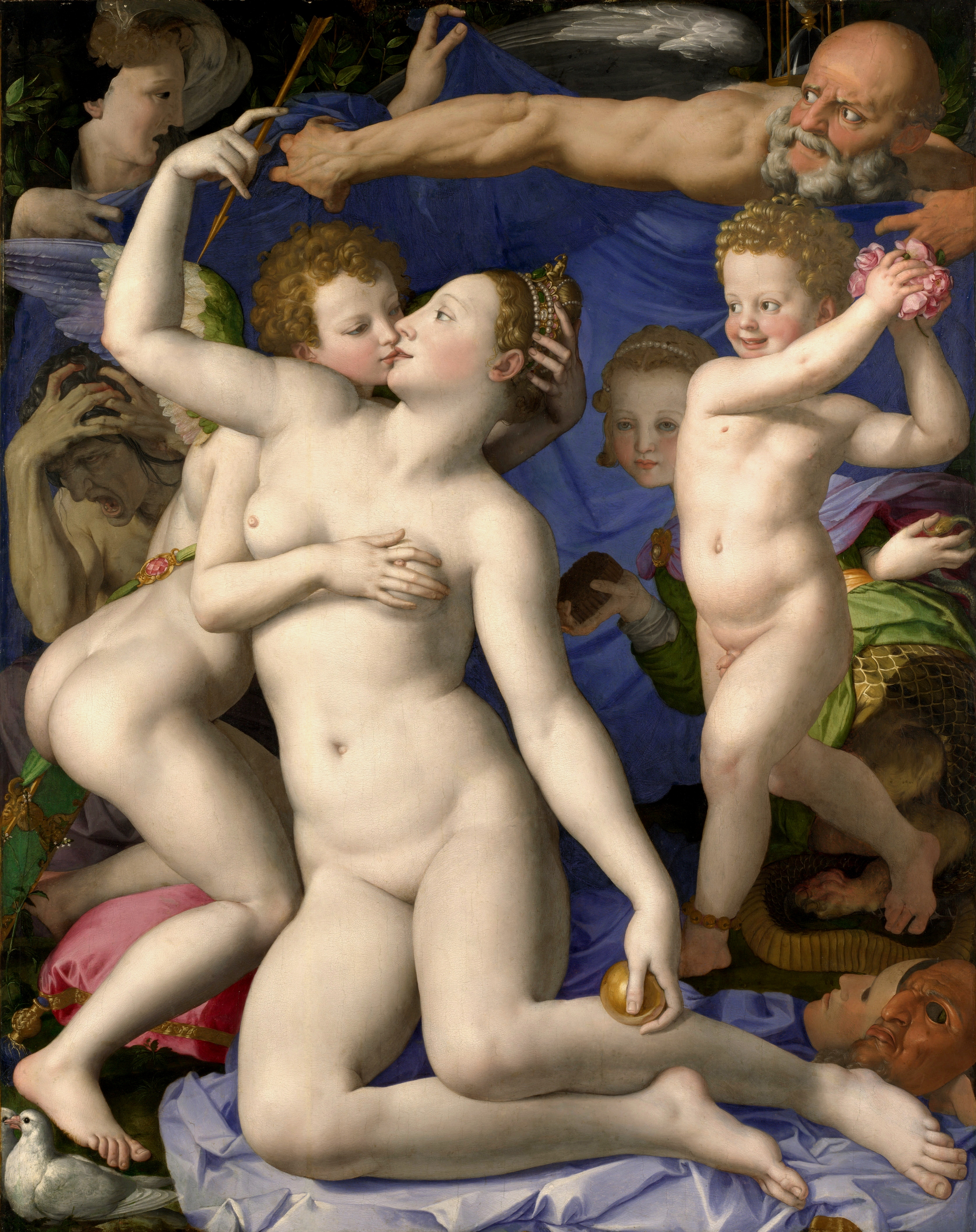
Venus, Cupid, Folly and Time, Agnolo Bronzino, c. 1545. According to André Félibien allegory was the highest form of all history painting.

There was some objection to the term, as many writers preferred terms such as "poetic painting" (poesia), or wanted to make a distinction between the "true" istoria, covering history including biblical and religious scenes, and the fabula, covering pagan myth, allegory, and scenes from fiction, which could not be regarded as true. The large works of Raphael were long considered, with those of Michelangelo, as the finest models for the genre.

In the Raphael Rooms in the Vatican Palace, allegories and historical scenes are mixed together, and the Raphael Cartoons show scenes from the Gospels, all in the Grand Manner that from the High Renaissance became associated with, and often expected in, history painting. In the Late Renaissance and Baroque the painting of actual history tended to degenerate into panoramic battle-scenes with the victorious monarch or general perched on a horse accompanied with his retinue, or formal scenes of ceremonies, although some artists managed to make a masterpiece from such unpromising material, as Velázquez did with his The Surrender of Breda.

An influential formulation of the hierarchy of genres, confirming the history painting at the top, was made in 1667 by André Félibien, a historiographer, architect and theoretician of French classicism became the classic statement of the theory for the 18th century:

Celui qui fait parfaitement des païsages est au-dessus d'un autre qui ne fait que des fruits, des fleurs ou des coquilles. Celui qui peint des animaux vivants est plus estimable que ceux qui ne représentent que des choses mortes & sans mouvement; & comme la figure de l'homme est le plus parfait ouvrage de Dieu sur la Terre, il est certain aussi que celui qui se rend l'imitateur de Dieu en peignant des figures humaines, est beaucoup plus excellent que tous les autres ... un Peintre qui ne fait que des portraits, n'a pas encore cette haute perfection de l'Art, & ne peut prétendre à l'honneur que reçoivent les plus sçavans. Il faut pour cela passer d'une seule figure à la représentation de plusieurs ensemble; il faut traiter l'histoire & la fable; il faut représenter de grandes actions comme les historiens, ou des sujets agréables comme les Poëtes; & montant encore plus haut, il faut par des compositions allégoriques, sçavoir couvrir sous le voile de la fable les vertus des grands hommes, & les mystères les plus relevez.

He who produces perfect landscapes is above another who only produces fruit, flowers or seashells. He who paints living animals is more than those who only represent dead things without movement, and as man is the most perfect work of God on the earth, it is also certain that he who becomes an imitator of God in representing human figures, is much more excellent than all the others ... a painter who only does portraits still does not have the highest perfection of his art, and cannot expect the honour due to the most skilled. For that he must pass from representing a single figure to several together; history and myth must be depicted; great events must be represented as by historians, or like the poets, subjects that will please, and climbing still higher, he must have the skill to cover under the veil of myth the virtues of great men in allegories, and the mysteries they reveal".

By the late 18th century, with both religious and mythological painting in decline, there was an increased demand for paintings of scenes from history, including contemporary history. This was in part driven by the changing audience for ambitious paintings, which now increasingly made their reputation in public exhibitions rather than by impressing the owners of and visitors to palaces and public buildings. Classical history remained popular, but scenes from national histories were often the best-received. From 1760 onwards, the Society of Artists of Great Britain, the first body to organize regular exhibitions in London, awarded two generous prizes each year to paintings of subjects from British history.

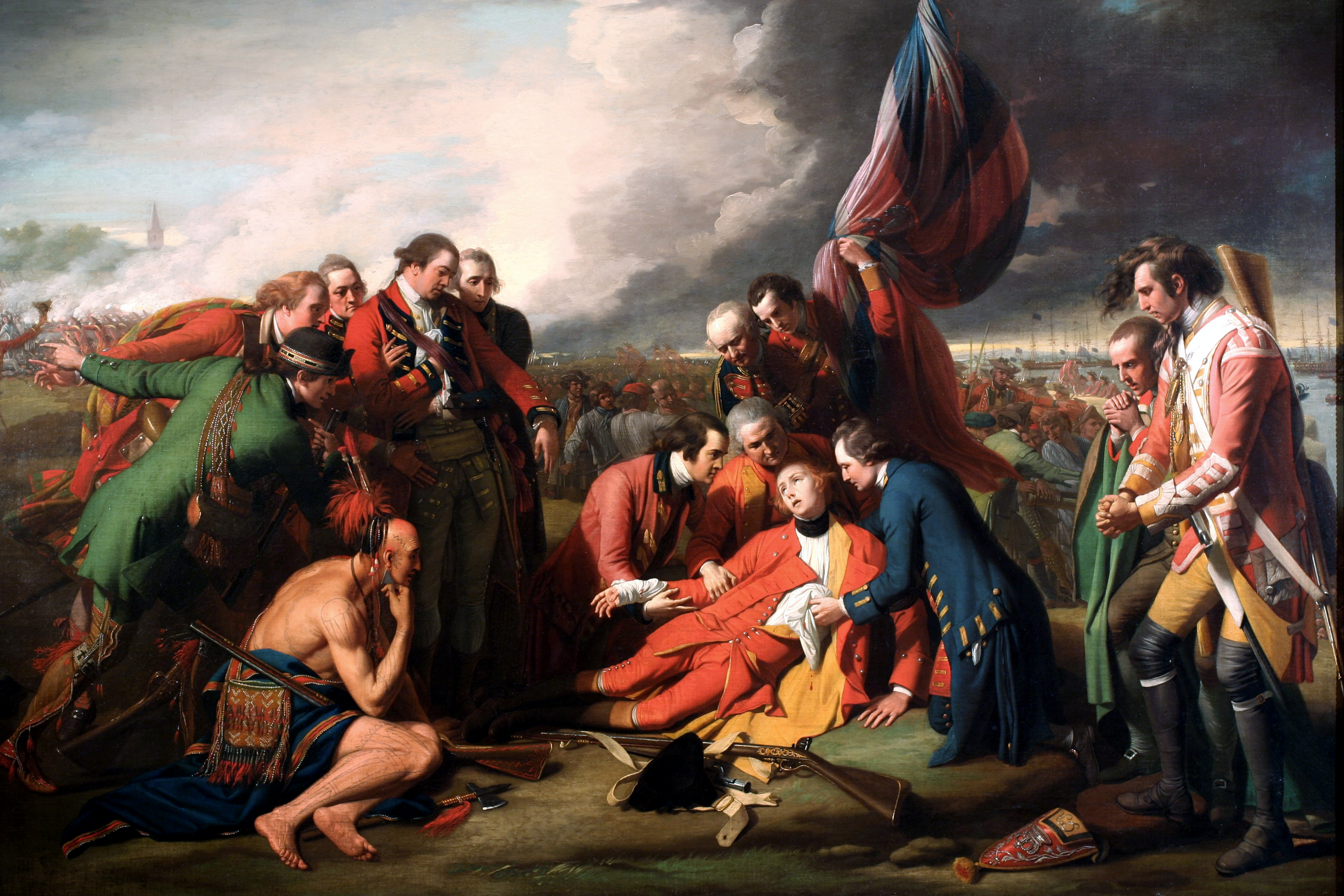
Benjamin West, The Death of General Wolfe (1770), an early example of the vogue for painting scenes from recent history.

The unheroic nature of modern dress was regarded as a serious difficulty. When, in 1770, Benjamin West proposed to paint The Death of General Wolfe in contemporary dress, he was firmly instructed to use classical costume by many people. He ignored these comments and showed the scene in modern dress. Although George III refused to purchase the work, West succeeded both in overcoming his critics' objections and inaugurating a more historically accurate style in such paintings. Other artists depicted scenes, regardless of when they occurred, in classical dress and for a long time, especially during the French Revolution, history painting often focused on depictions of the heroic male nude.

The large production, using the finest French artists, of propaganda paintings glorifying the exploits of Napoleon, were matched by works, showing both victories and losses, from the anti-Napoleonic alliance by artists such as Goya and J. M. W. Turner. Théodore Géricault's The Raft of the Medusa (1818–1819) was a sensation, appearing to update the history painting for the 19th century, and showing anonymous figures famous only for being victims of what was then a famous and controversial disaster at sea. Conveniently their clothes had been worn away to classical-seeming rags by the point the painting depicts. At the same time the demand for traditional large religious history paintings very largely fell away.

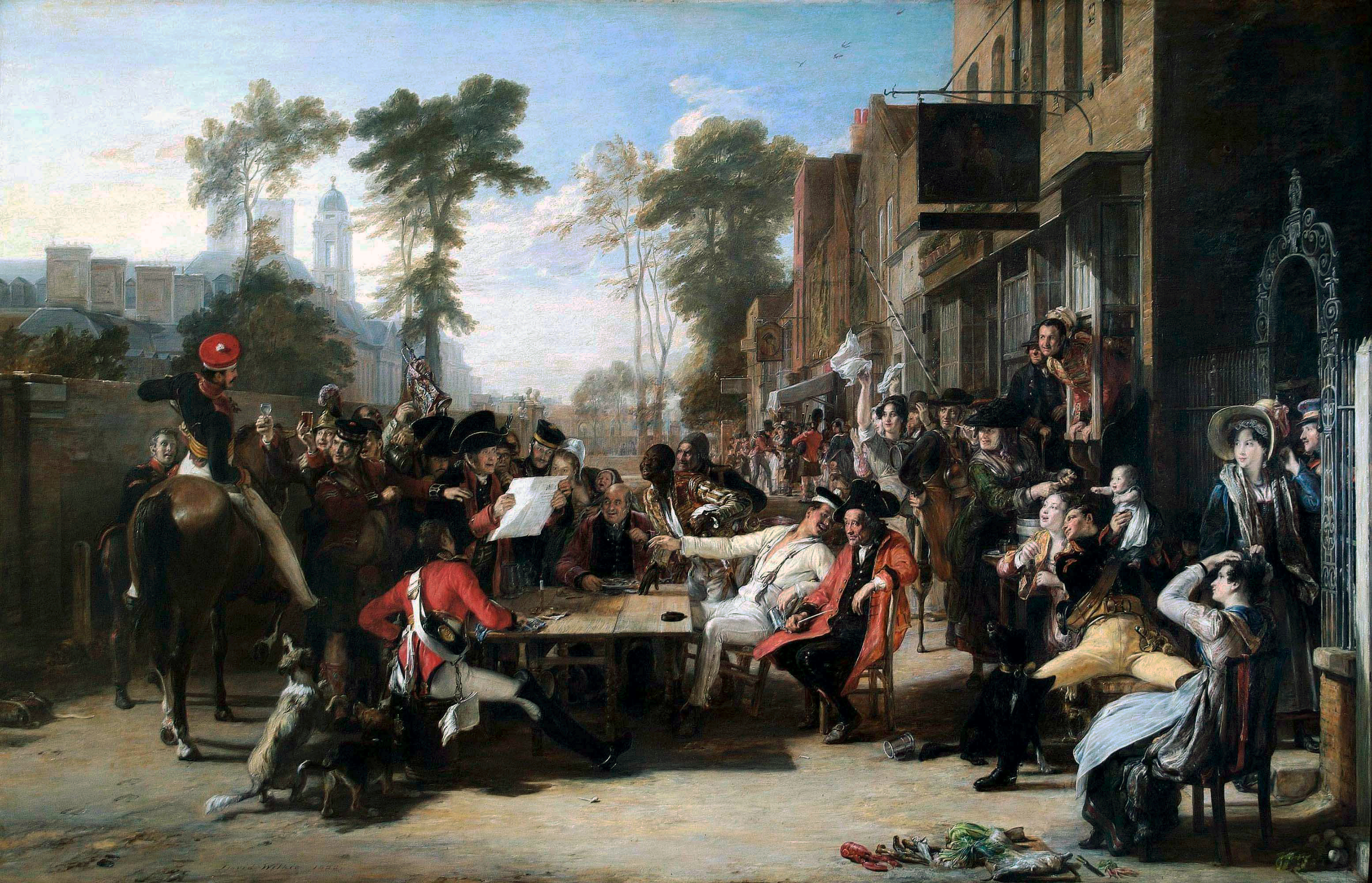
Sir David Wilkie, The Chelsea Pensioners reading the Waterloo Dispatch, 1822. Genre or history painting? The types have merged, in a way typical of the 19th century.

In the mid-nineteenth century there arose a style known as historicism, which marked a formal imitation of historical styles and/or artists. Another development in the nineteenth century was the treatment of historical subjects, often on a large scale, with the values of genre painting, the depiction of scenes of everyday life, and anecdote. Grand depictions of events of great public importance were supplemented with scenes depicting more personal incidents in the lives of the great, or of scenes centred on unnamed figures involved in historical events, as in the Troubadour style. At the same time scenes of ordinary life with moral, political or satirical content became often the main vehicle for expressive interplay between figures in painting, whether given a modern or historical setting.

By the later 19th century, history painting was often explicitly rejected by avant-garde movements such as the Impressionists (except for Édouard Manet) and the Symbolists, and according to one recent writer "Modernism was to a considerable extent built upon the rejection of History Painting... All other genres are deemed capable of entering, in one form or another, the 'pantheon' of modernity considered, but History Painting is excluded".

== History painting and historical painting ==
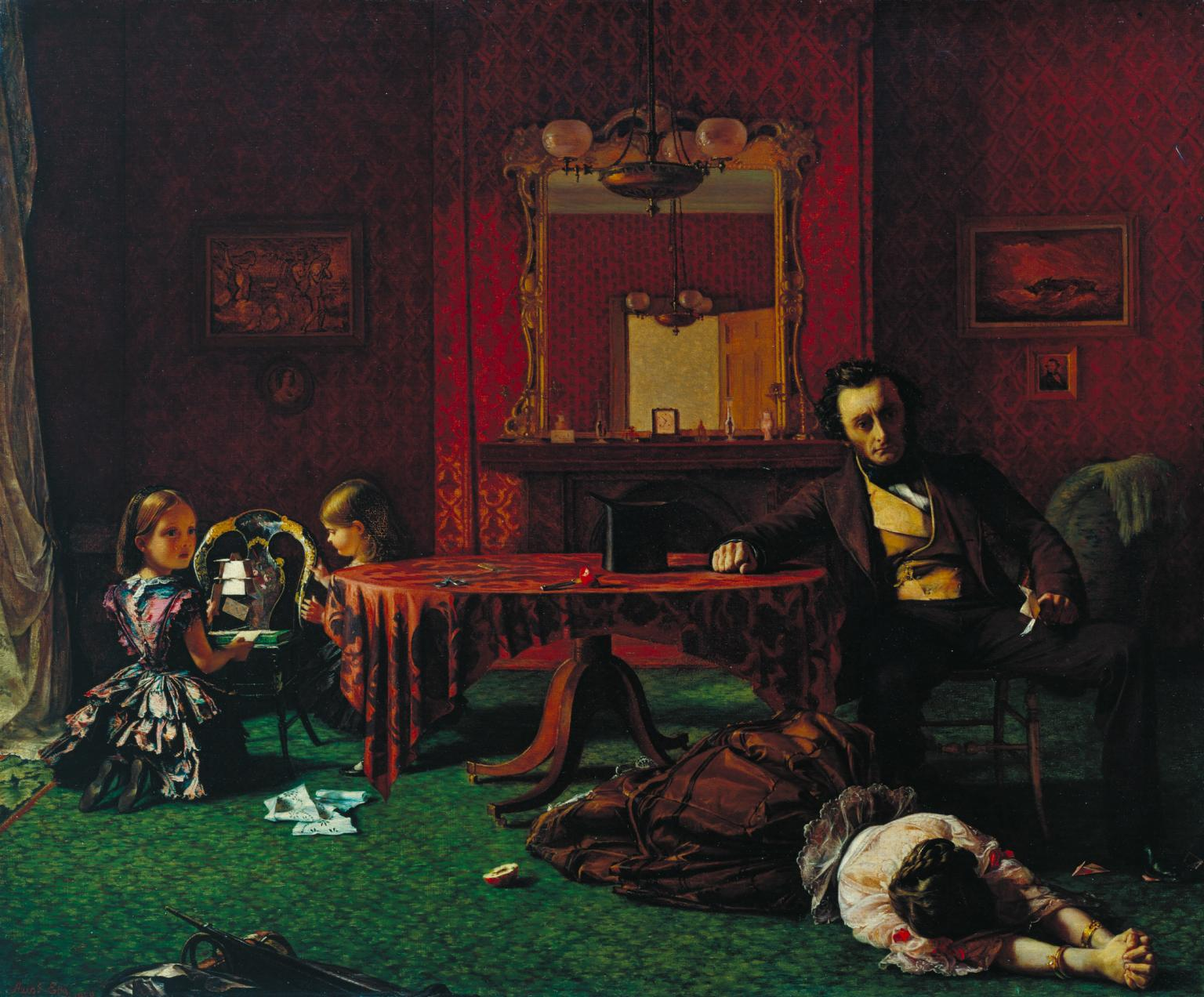
"No. 1, Misfortune" from Augustus Egg's Past and Present, 1858. The husband has discovered his wife's infidelity. Prayer and Despair complete the set.

=== The terms ===
Initially, "history painting" and "historical painting" were used interchangeably in English, as when Sir Joshua Reynolds in his fourth Discourse uses both indiscriminately to cover "history painting", while saying "...it ought to be called poetical, as in reality it is", reflecting the French term peinture historique, one equivalent of "history painting". The terms began to separate in the 19th century, with "historical painting" becoming a sub-group of "history painting" restricted to subjects taken from history in its normal sense. In 1853 John Ruskin asked his audience: "What do you at present mean by historical painting? Now-a-days it means the endeavour, by the power of imagination, to portray some historical event of past days." So for example Harold Wethey's three-volume catalogue of the paintings of Titian (Phaidon, 1969–75) is divided between "Religious Paintings", "Portraits", and "Mythological and Historical Paintings", though both volumes I and III cover what is included in the term "History Paintings". This distinction is useful but is by no means generally observed, and the terms are still often used in a confusing manner. Because of the potential for confusion modern academic writing tends to avoid the phrase "historical painting", talking instead of "historical subject matter" in history painting, but where the phrase is still used in contemporary scholarship it will normally mean the painting of subjects from history, very often in the 19th century. "Historical painting" may also be used, especially in discussion of painting techniques in conservation studies, to mean "old", as opposed to modern or recent painting.

In 19th-century British writing on art the terms "subject painting" or "anecdotic" painting were often used for works in a line of development going back to William Hogarth of monoscenic depictions of crucial moments in an implied narrative with unidentified characters, such as William Holman Hunt's 1853 painting The Awakening Conscience or Augustus Egg's Past and Present, a set of three paintings, updating sets by Hogarth such as Marriage à-la-mode.

=== 19th century ===
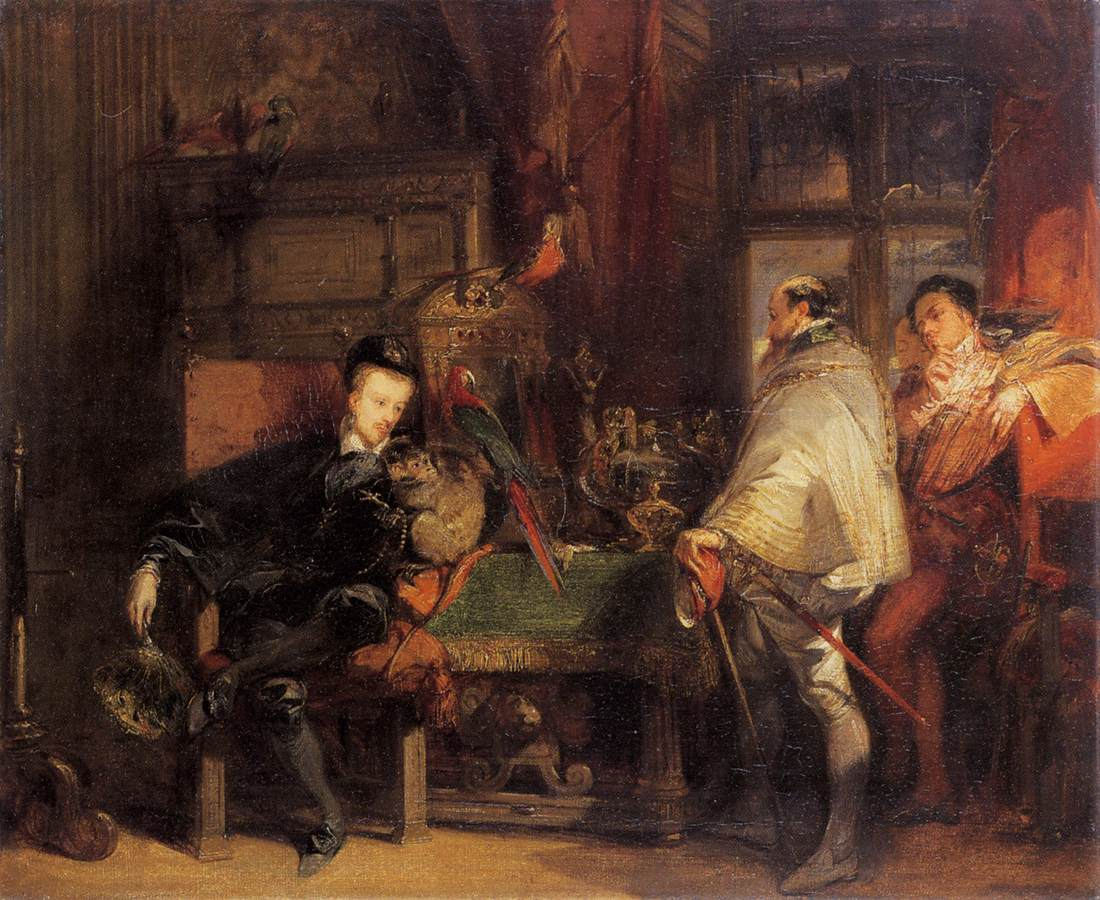
Richard Parkes Bonington, Henri III and the English Ambassador, 1827–28, a small "Intimate Romantic" anecdotal scene from history

History painting was the dominant form of academic painting in the various national academies in the 18th century, and for most of the 19th, and increasingly historical subjects dominated. During the Revolutionary and Napoleonic periods the heroic treatment of contemporary history in a frankly propagandistic fashion by Antoine-Jean, Baron Gros, Jacques-Louis David, Carle Vernet and others was supported by the French state, but after the fall of Napoleon in 1815 the French governments were not regarded as suitable for heroic treatment and many artists retreated further into the past to find subjects, though in Britain depicting the victories of the Napoleonic Wars mostly occurred after they were over. Another path was to choose contemporary subjects that were oppositional to government either at home and abroad, and many of what were arguably the last great generation of history paintings were protests at contemporary episodes of repression or outrages at home or abroad: Goya's The Third of May 1808 (1814), Théodore Géricault's The Raft of the Medusa (1818–19), Eugène Delacroix's The Massacre at Chios (1824) and Liberty Leading the People (1830). These were heroic, but showed heroic suffering by ordinary civilians.

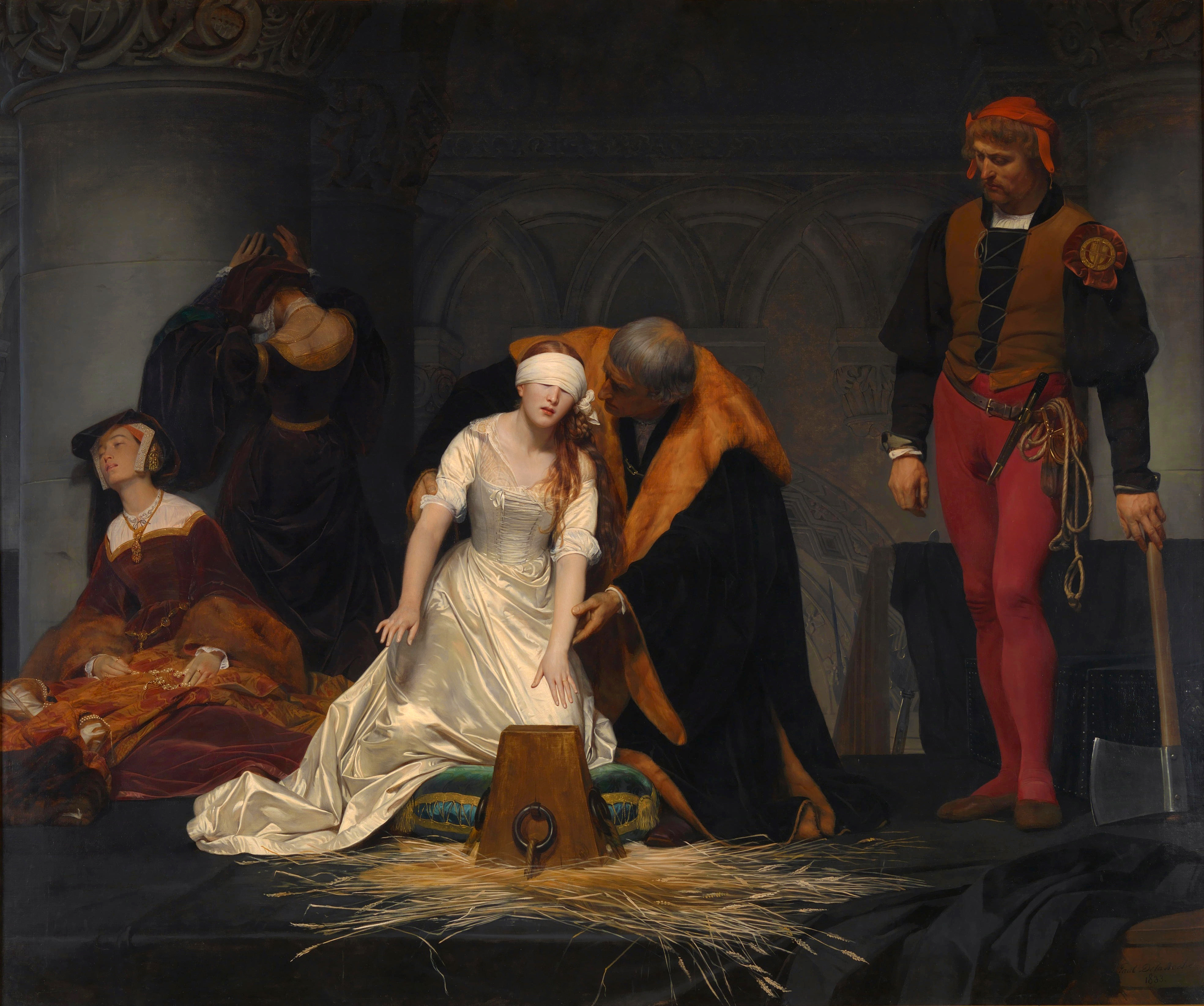
Paul Delaroche, The Execution of Lady Jane Grey, 1833, National Gallery, London

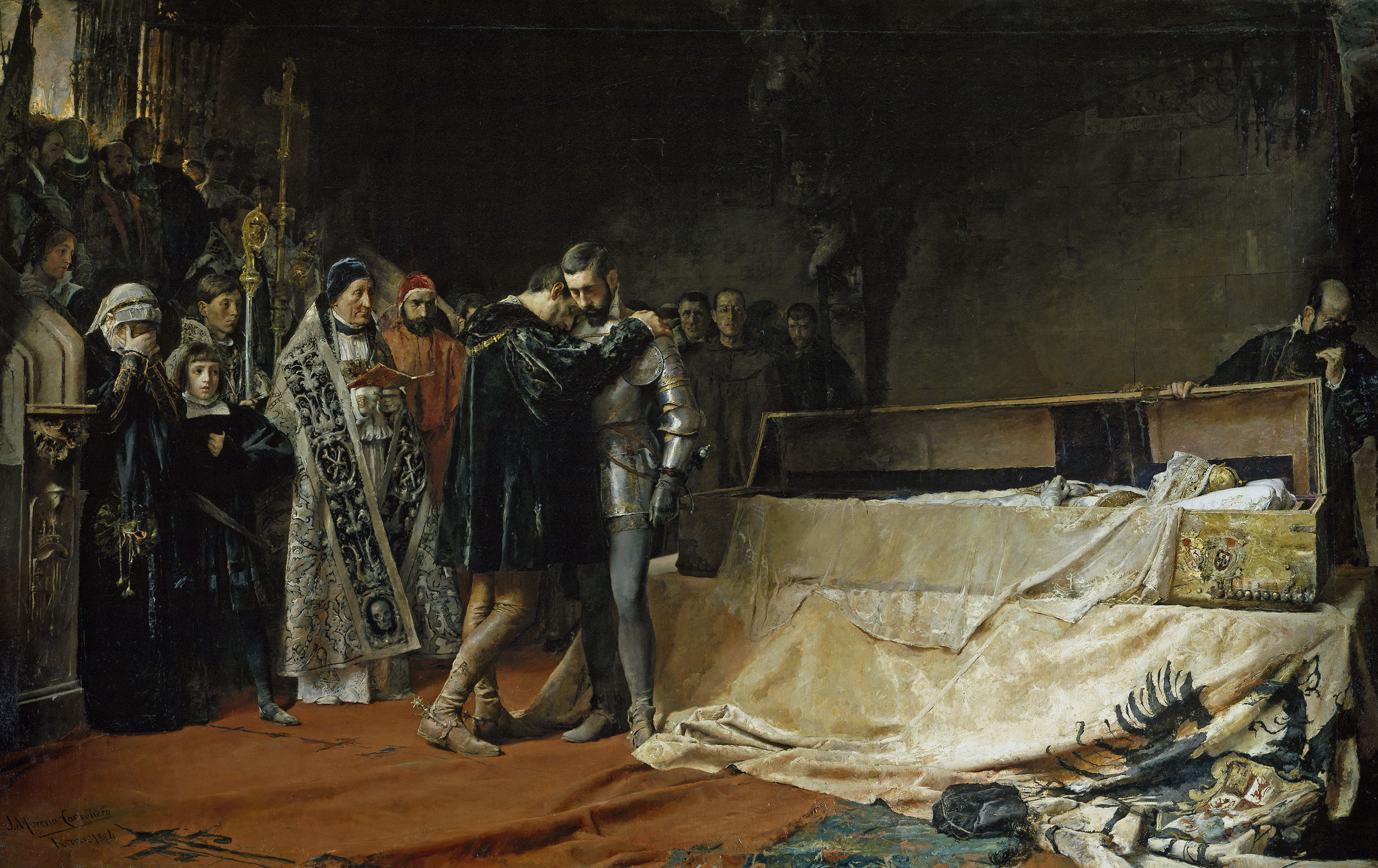
José Moreno Carbonero, Conversion of the Duke of Gandía, 1881, Museo del Prado, Madrid

Romantic artists such as Géricault and Delacroix, and those from other movements such as the English Pre-Raphaelite Brotherhood continued to regard history painting as the ideal for their most ambitious works. Others such as Jan Matejko in Poland, Vasily Surikov in Russia, José Moreno Carbonero in Spain and Paul Delaroche in France became specialized painters of large historical subjects. The style troubadour ("troubadour style") was a somewhat derisive French term for earlier paintings of medieval and Renaissance scenes, which were often small and depicting moments of anecdote rather than drama; Ingres, Richard Parkes Bonington and Henri Fradelle painted such works. Sir Roy Strong calls this type of work the "Intimate Romantic", and in French it was known as the "peinture de genre historique" or "peinture anecdotique" ("historical genre painting" or "anecdotal painting").

Church commissions for large group scenes from the Bible had greatly reduced, and historical painting became very significant. Especially in the early 19th century, much historical painting depicted specific moments from historical literature, with the novels of Sir Walter Scott a particular favourite, in France and other European countries as much as Great Britain. By the middle of the century medieval scenes were expected to be very carefully researched, using the work of historians of costume, architecture and all elements of decor that were becoming available. An example of this is the extensive research of Byzantine architecture, clothing, and decoration made in Parisian museums and libraries by Moreno Carbonero for his masterwork The Entry of Roger de Flor in Constantinople. The provision of examples and expertise for artists, as well as revivalist industrial designers, was one of the motivations for the establishment of museums like the Victoria and Albert Museum in London.

New techniques of printmaking such as the chromolithograph made good quality reproductions both relatively cheap and very widely accessible, and also hugely profitable for artist and publisher, as the sales were so large. Historical painting often had a close relationship with Nationalism, and painters like Matejko in Poland could play an important role in fixing the prevailing historical narrative of national history in the popular mind. In France, L'art Pompier ("Fireman art") was a derisory term for official academic historical painting, and in a final phase, "History painting of a debased sort, scenes of brutality and terror, purporting to illustrate episodes from Roman and Moorish history, were Salon sensations. On the overcrowded walls of the exhibition galleries, the paintings that shouted loudest got the attention". Orientalist painting was an alternative genre that offered similar exotic costumes and decor, and at least as much opportunity to depict sex and violence.

== Gallery ==
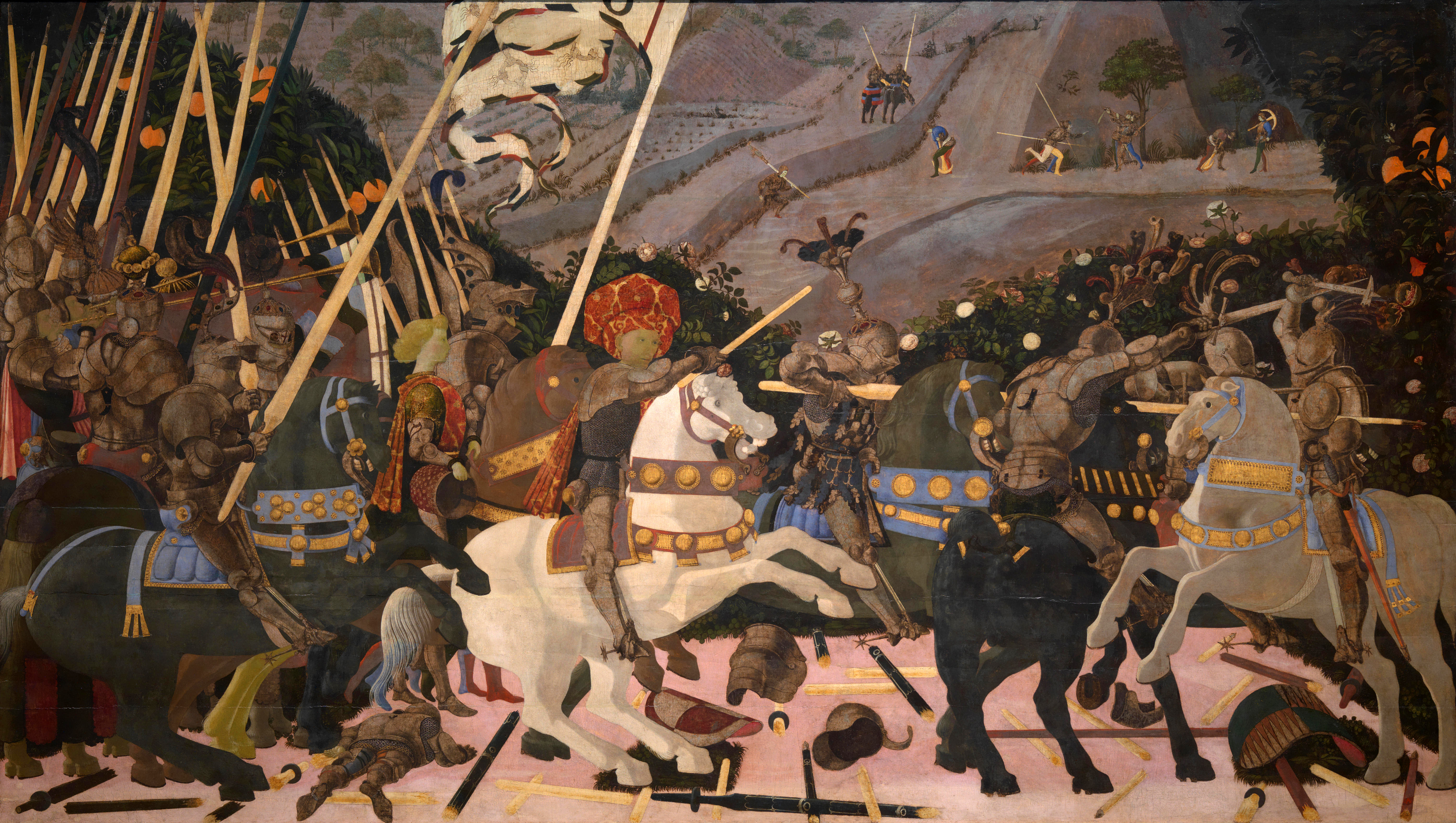
Paolo Uccello, 1438–1440, The Battle of San Romano, Uffizi, Florence

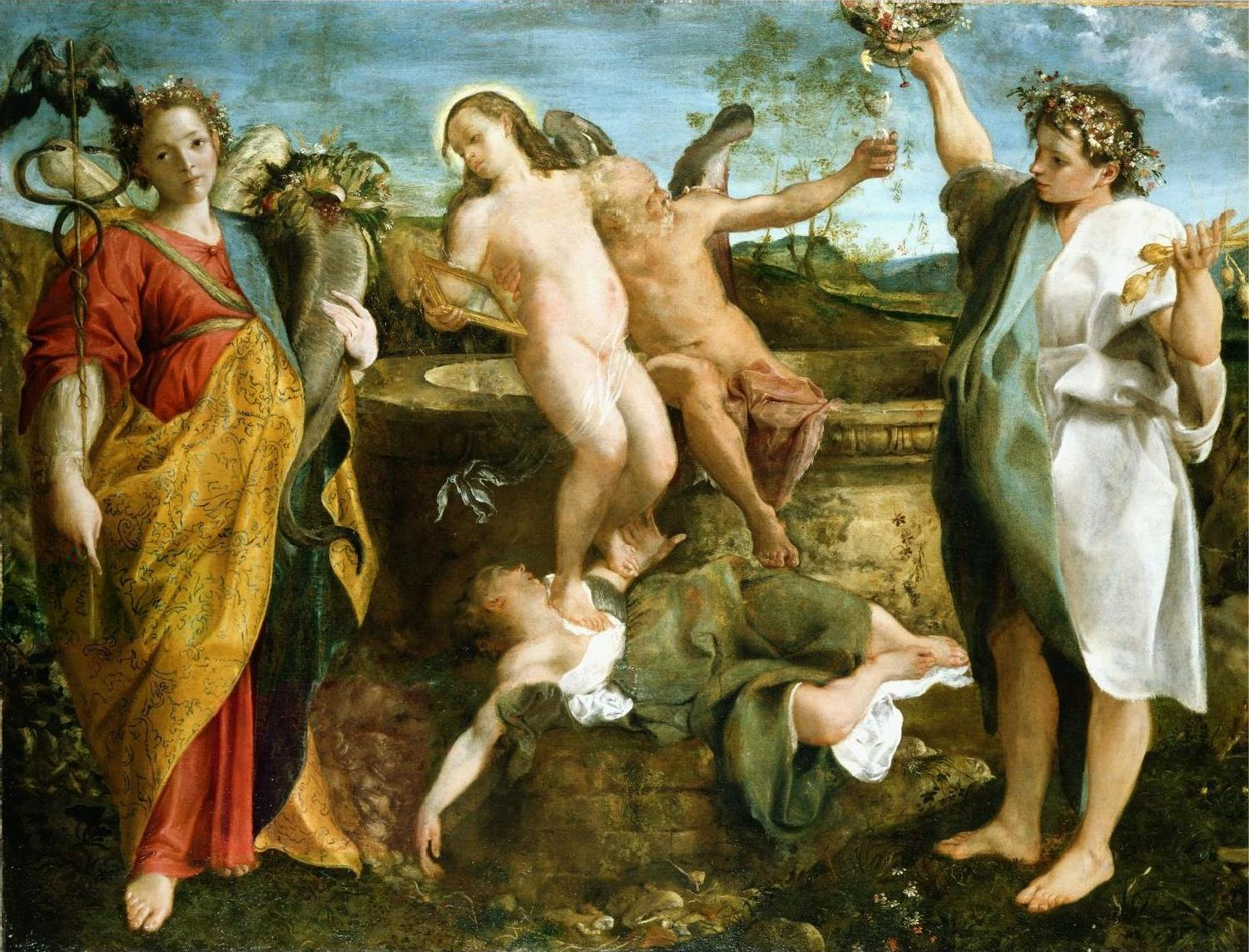
Annibale Carracci, An Allegory of Truth and Time (1584–85), an allegorical history painting

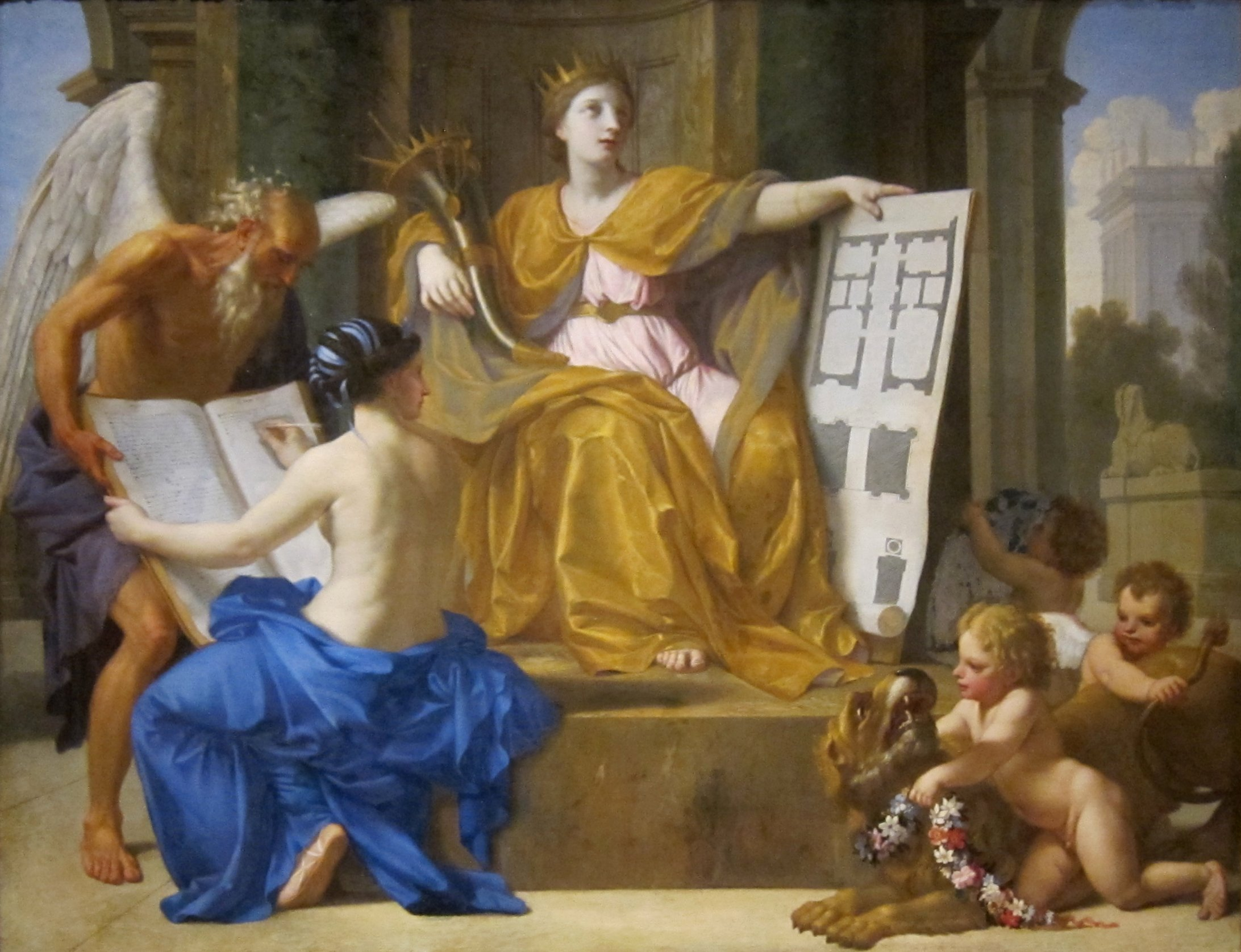
Allegory of Magnificence, Eustache Le Sueur, c. 1654

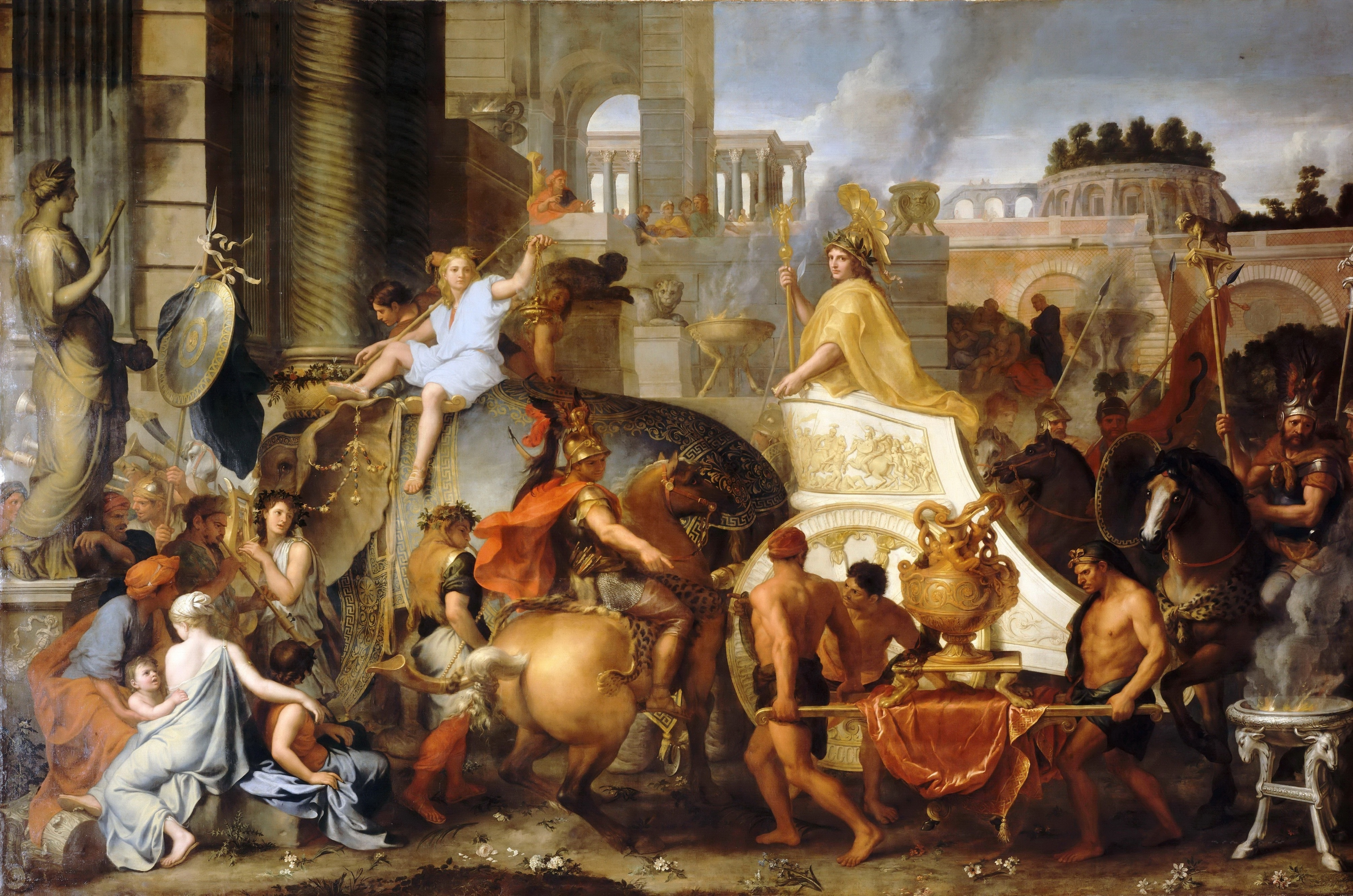
Charles Le Brun, 1664, Entry of Alexander into Babylon, Louvre, Paris

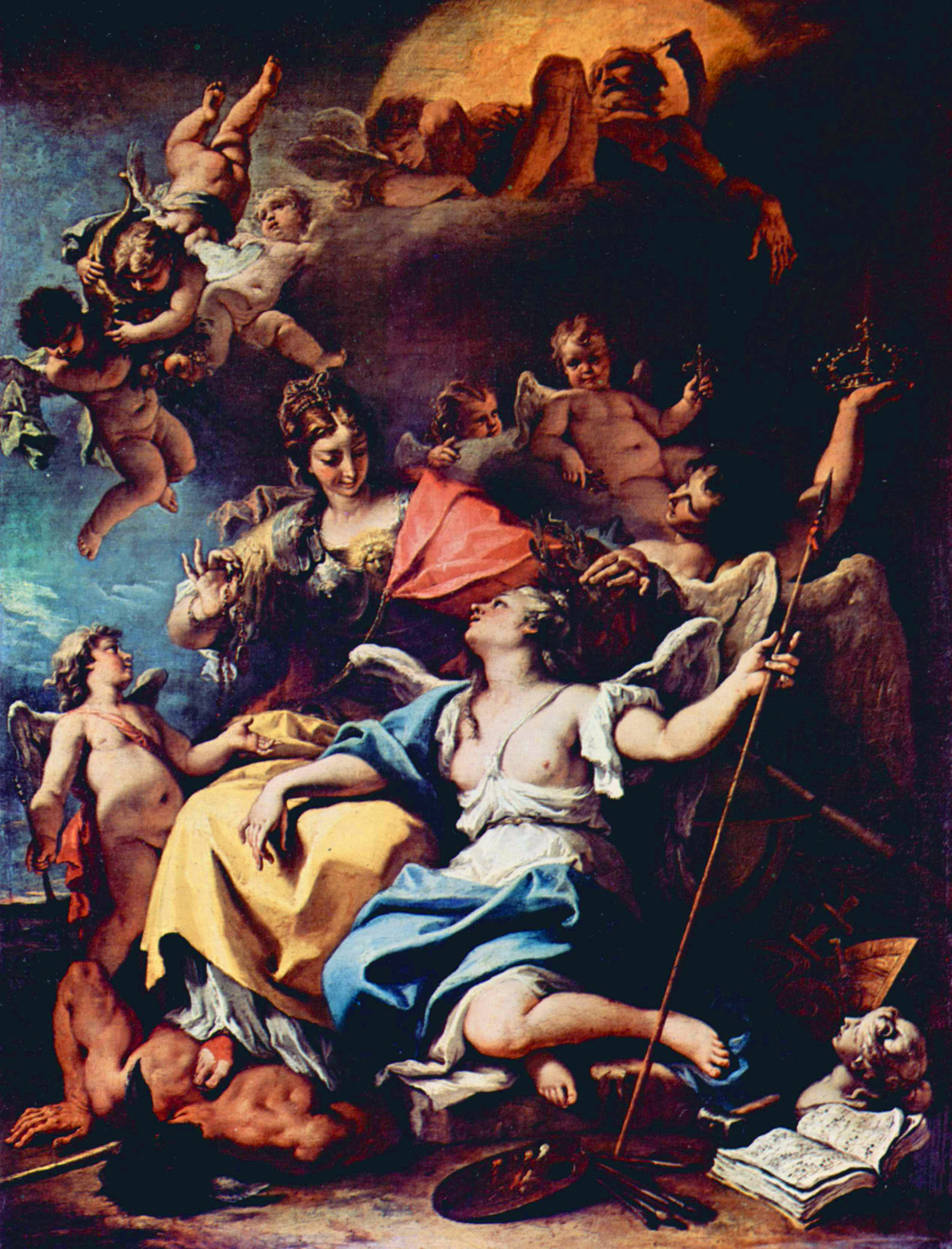
Sebastiano Ricci, Allegory of France as Minerva Trampling Ignorance and Crowning Virtue, 1717–18

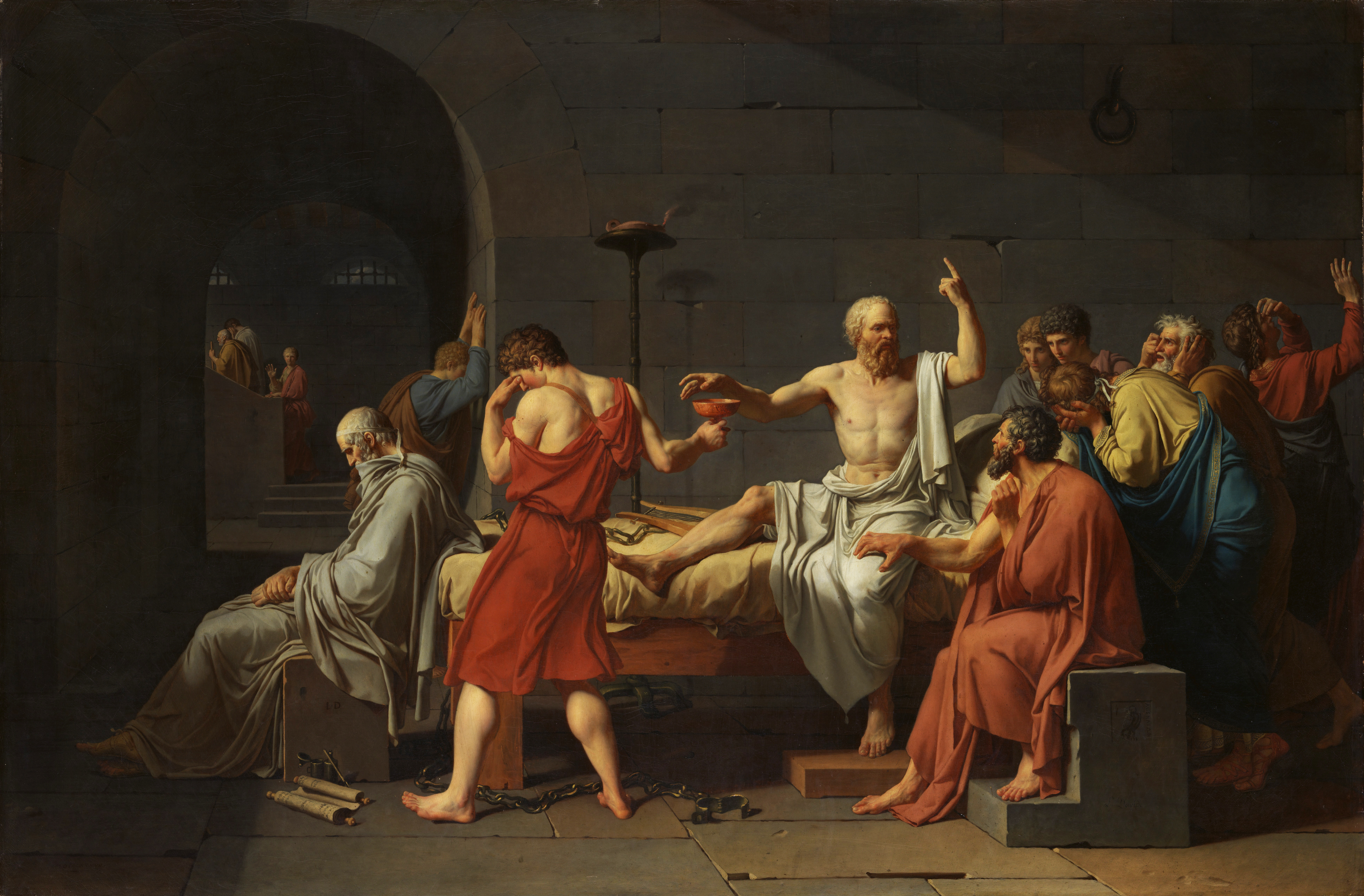
Jacques-Louis David, 1787, The Death of Socrates, École Nationale Supérieure des Beaux-Arts, Paris

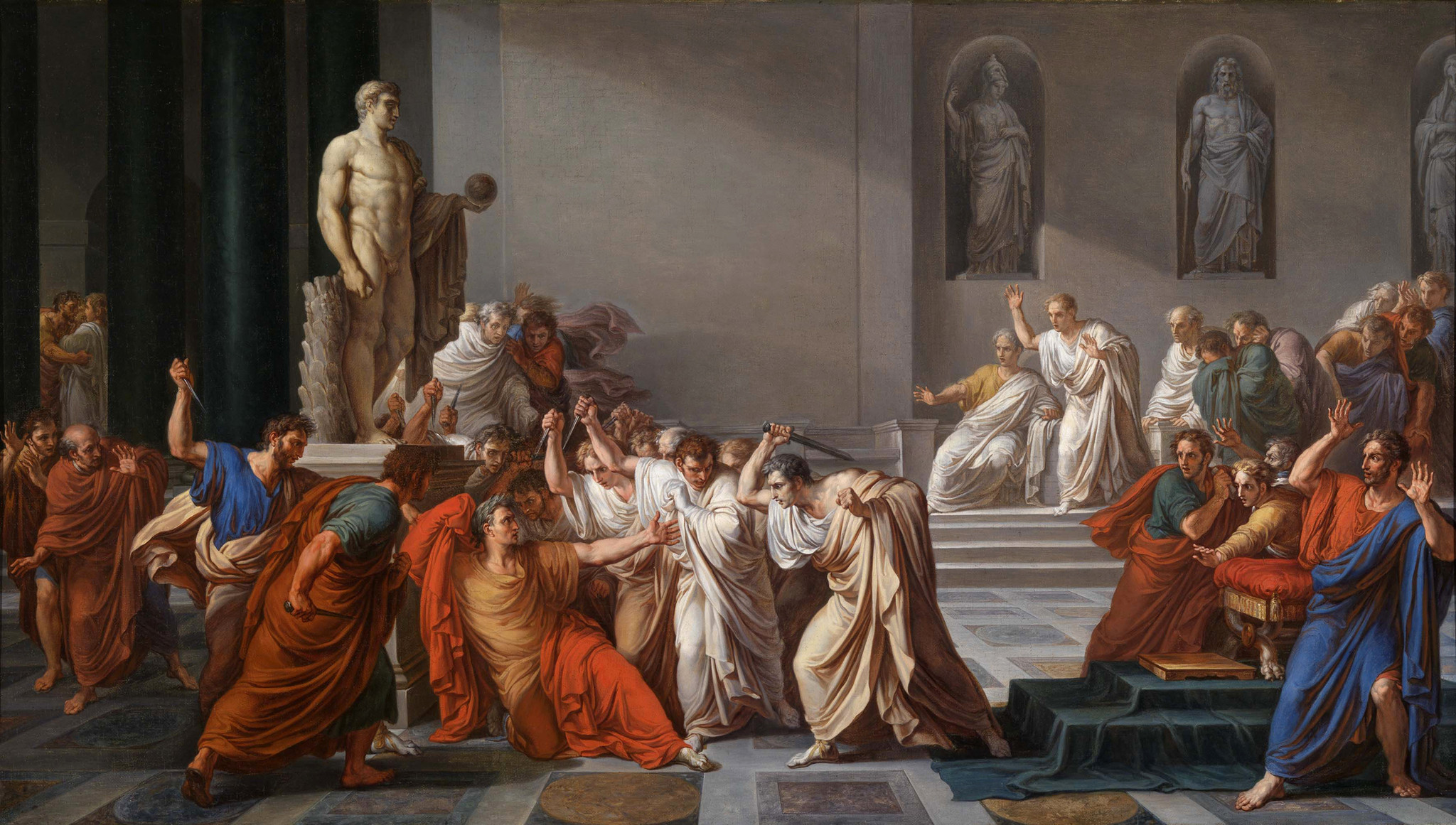
Vincenzo Camuccini, Assassination of Julius Caesar, 1805

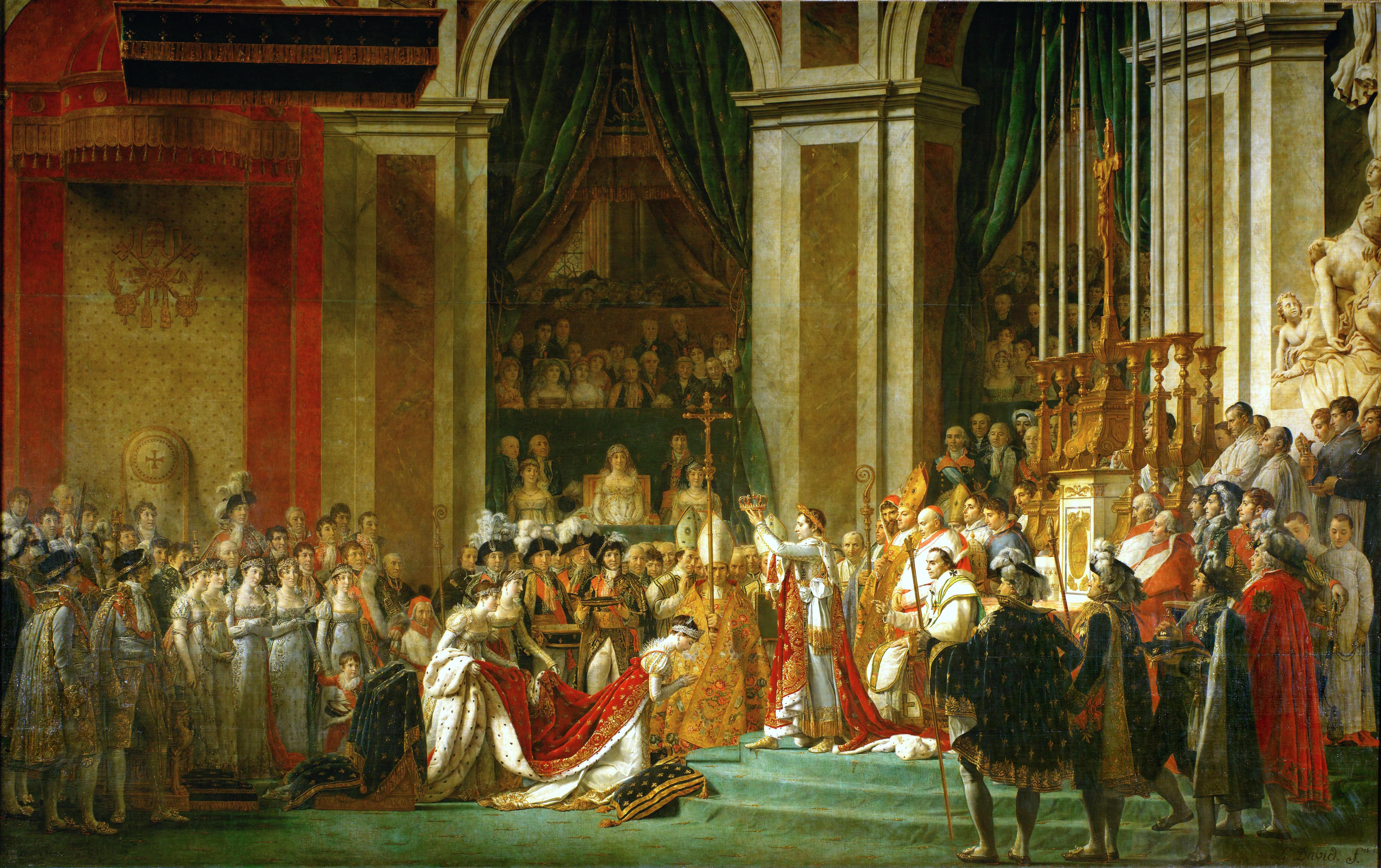
Jacques-Louis David, The Coronation of Napoleon, c. 1807

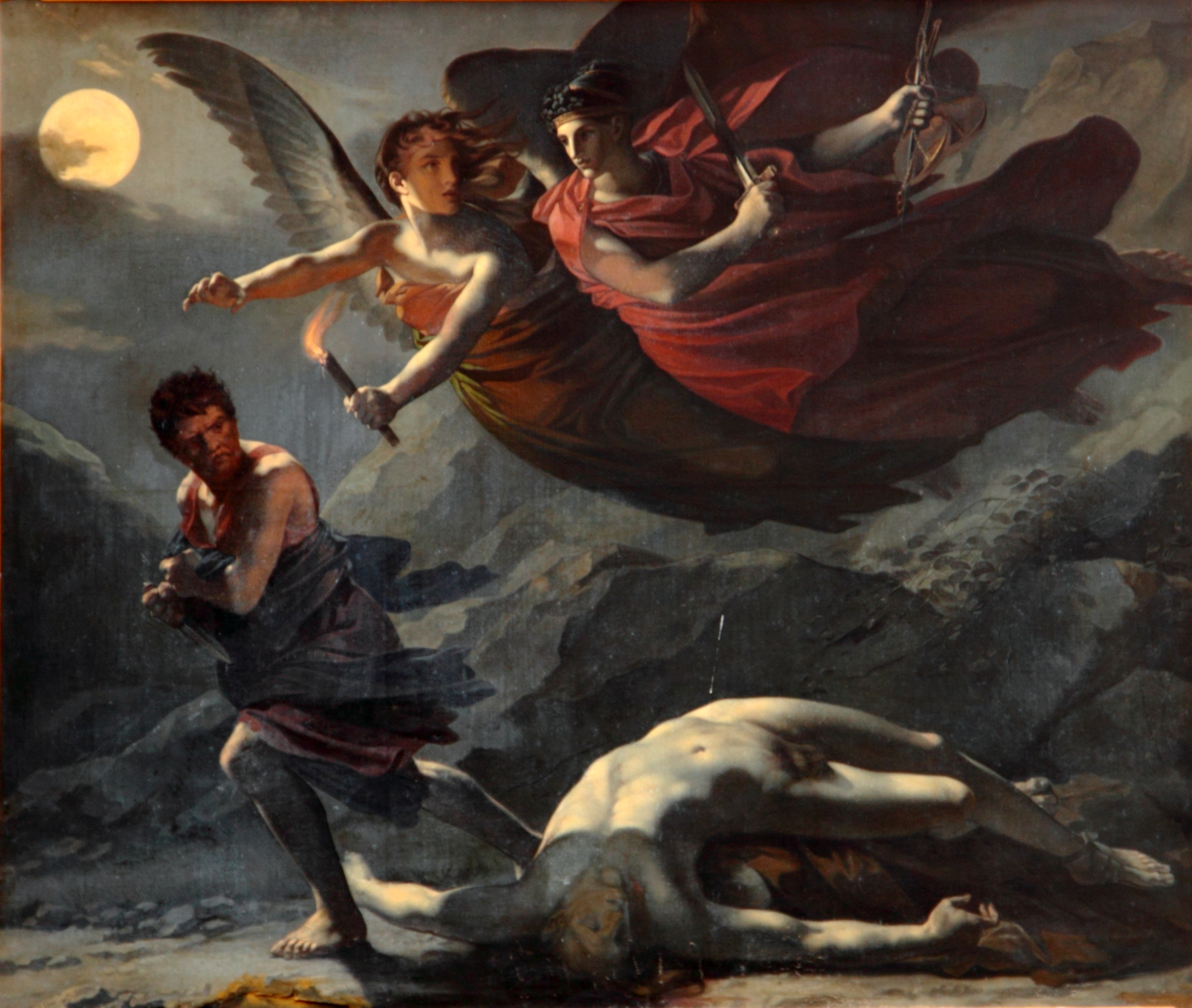
Justice and Divine Vengeance Pursuing Crime, Pierre-Paul Prud'hon, c. 1805–1808

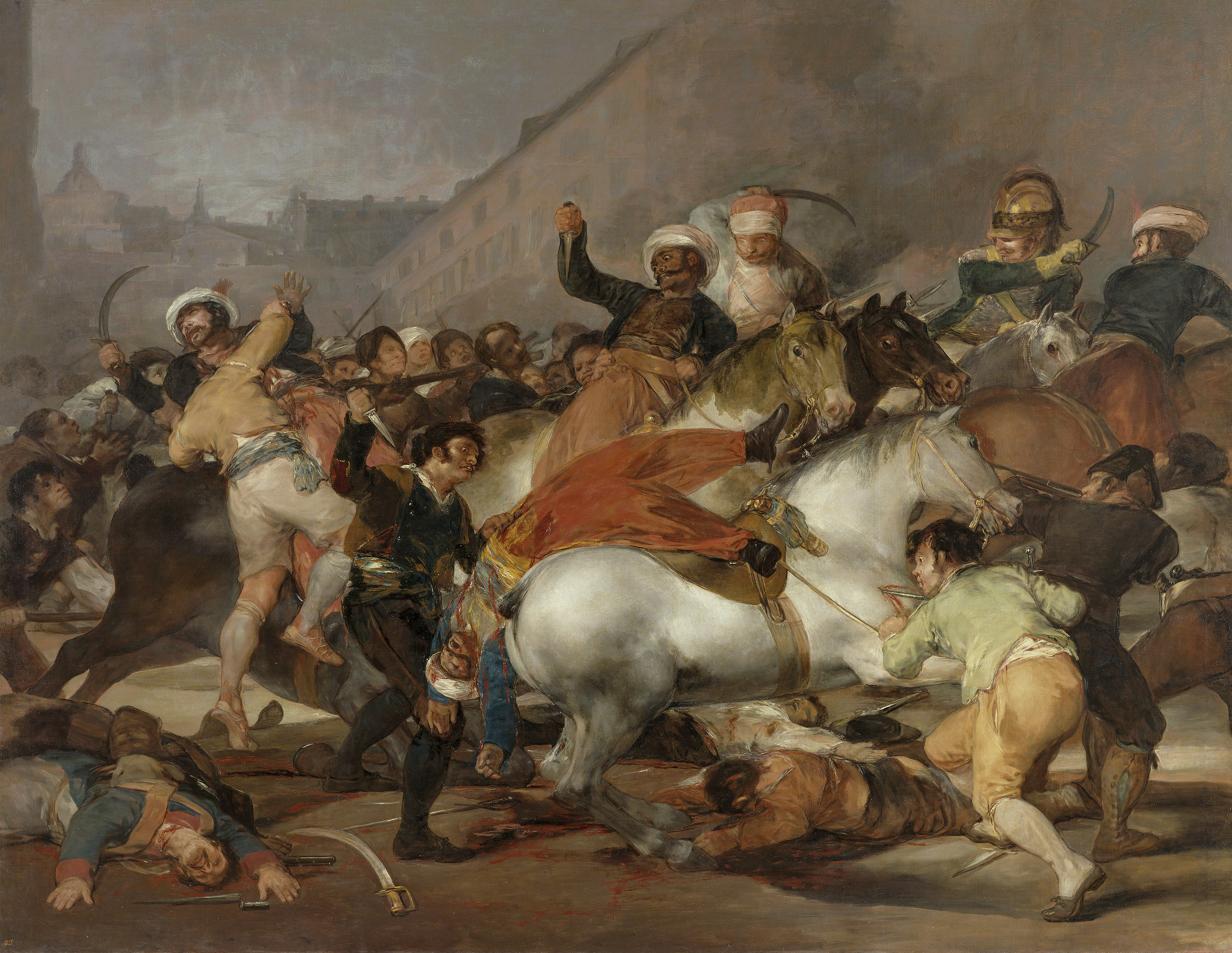
Francisco de Goya, 1814, The Second of May 1808, Museo del Prado, Madrid

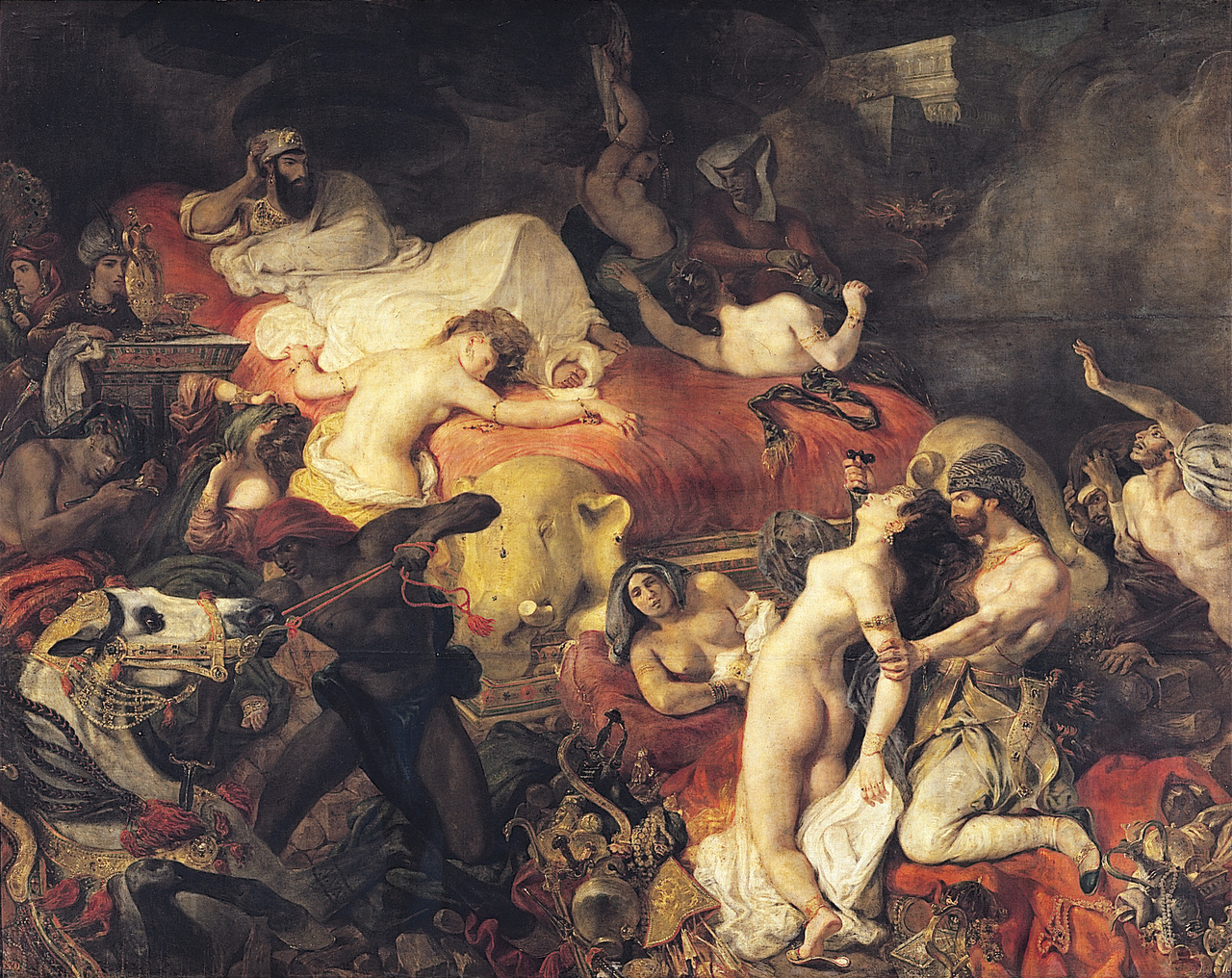
Eugène Delacroix, 1827, Death of Sardanapalus, Louvre, Paris

Karl Bryullov, The Last Day of Pompeii, 1827–1833

Eugène Delacroix, Liberty Leading the People, 1830, Louvre, Paris

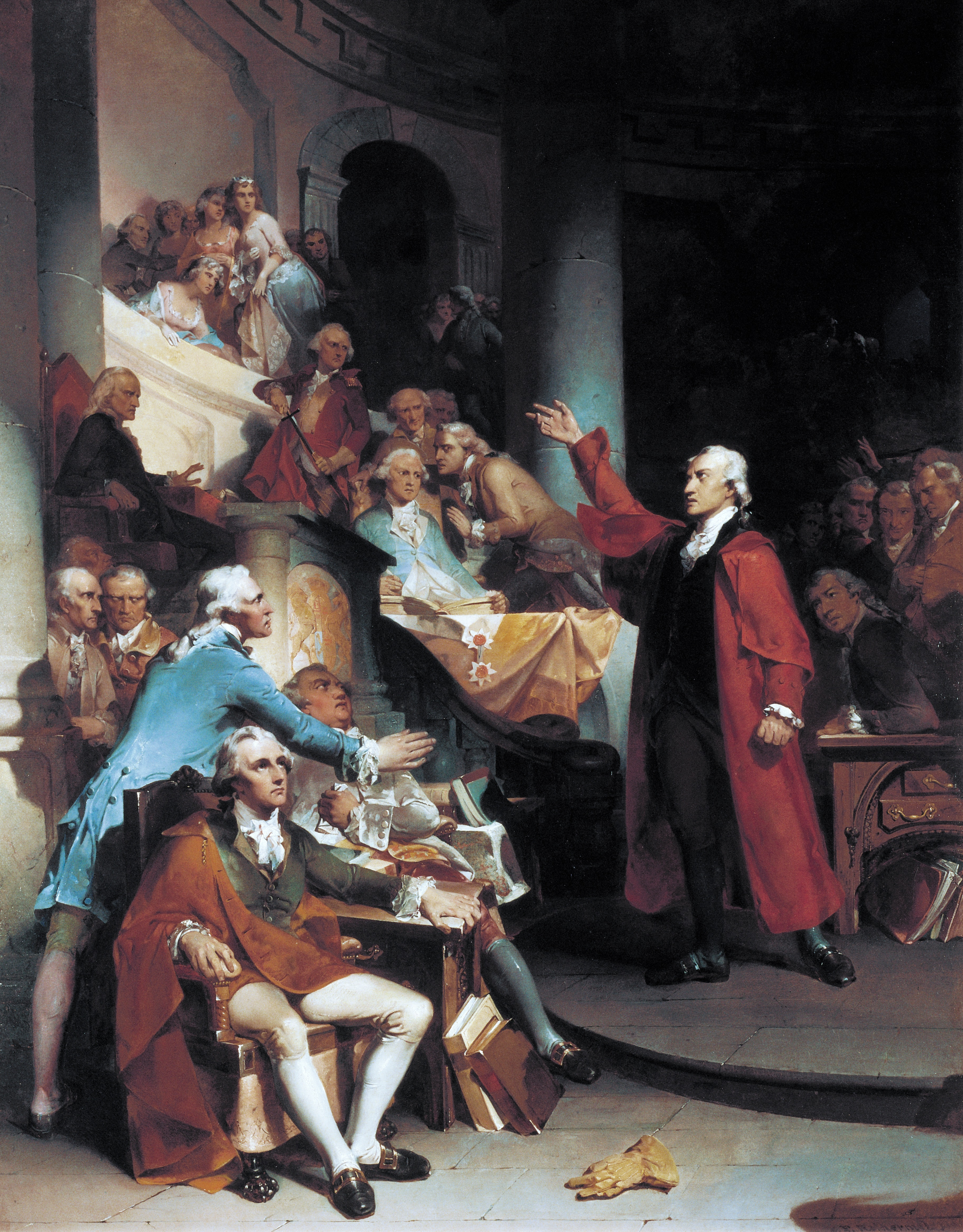
Patrick Henry Before the Virginia House of Burgesses, 1851, Red Hill Patrick Henry National Memorial, Brookneal

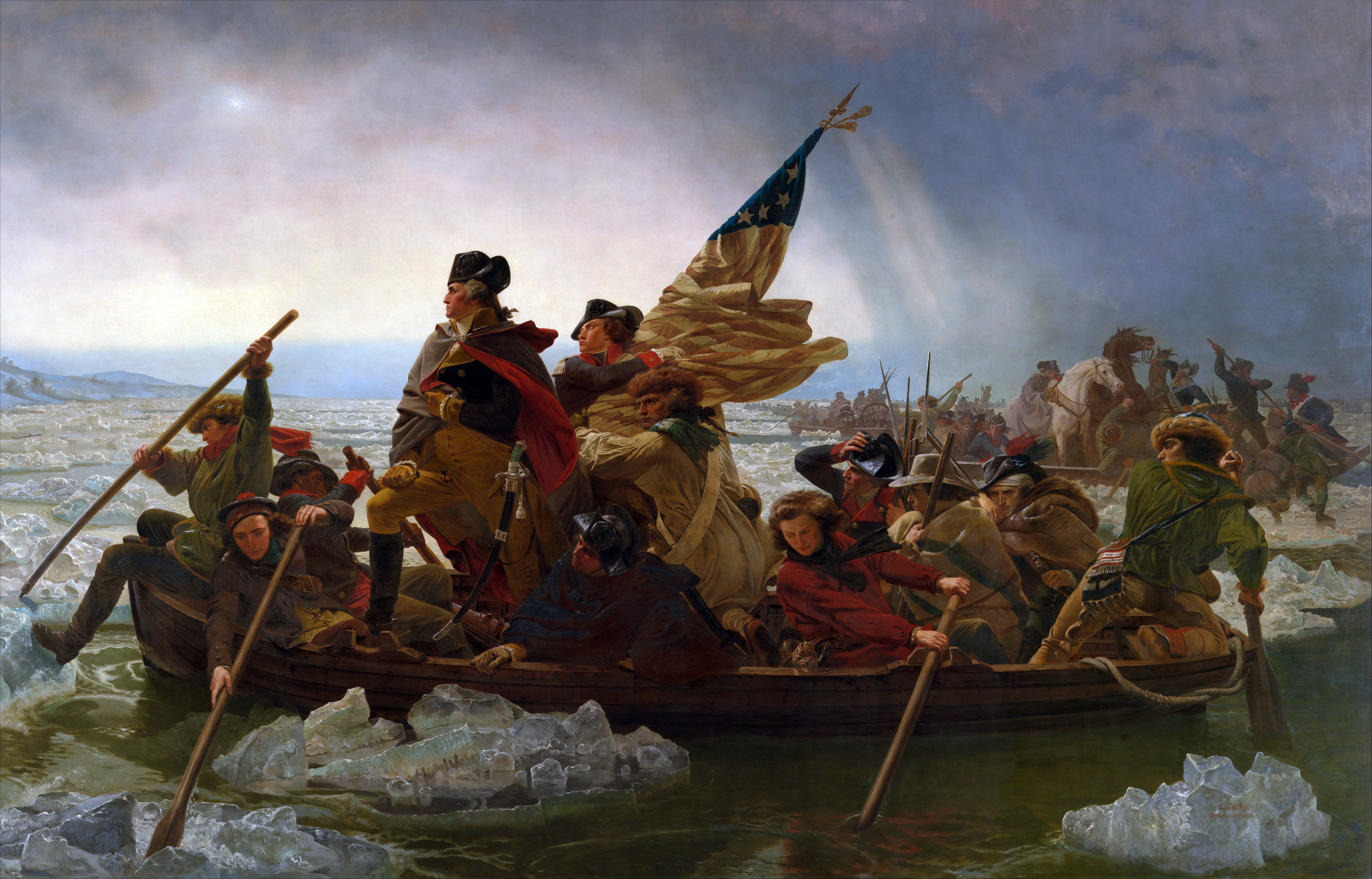
Emanuel Leutze, Washington Crossing the Delaware, 1851, Metropolitan Museum of Art, New York

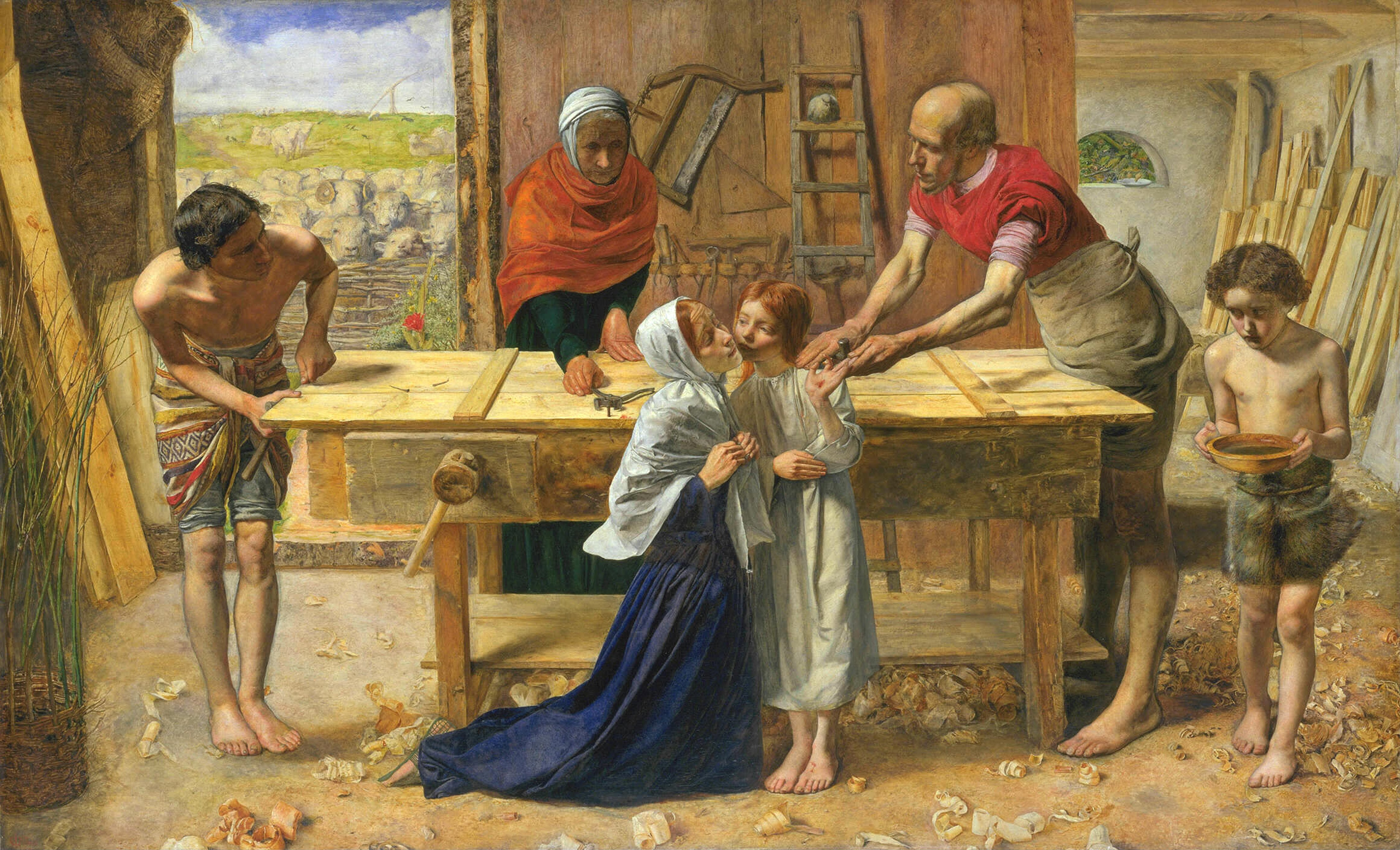
John Everett Millais, Christ in the House of His Parents, 1854–1860, Tate Britain, London

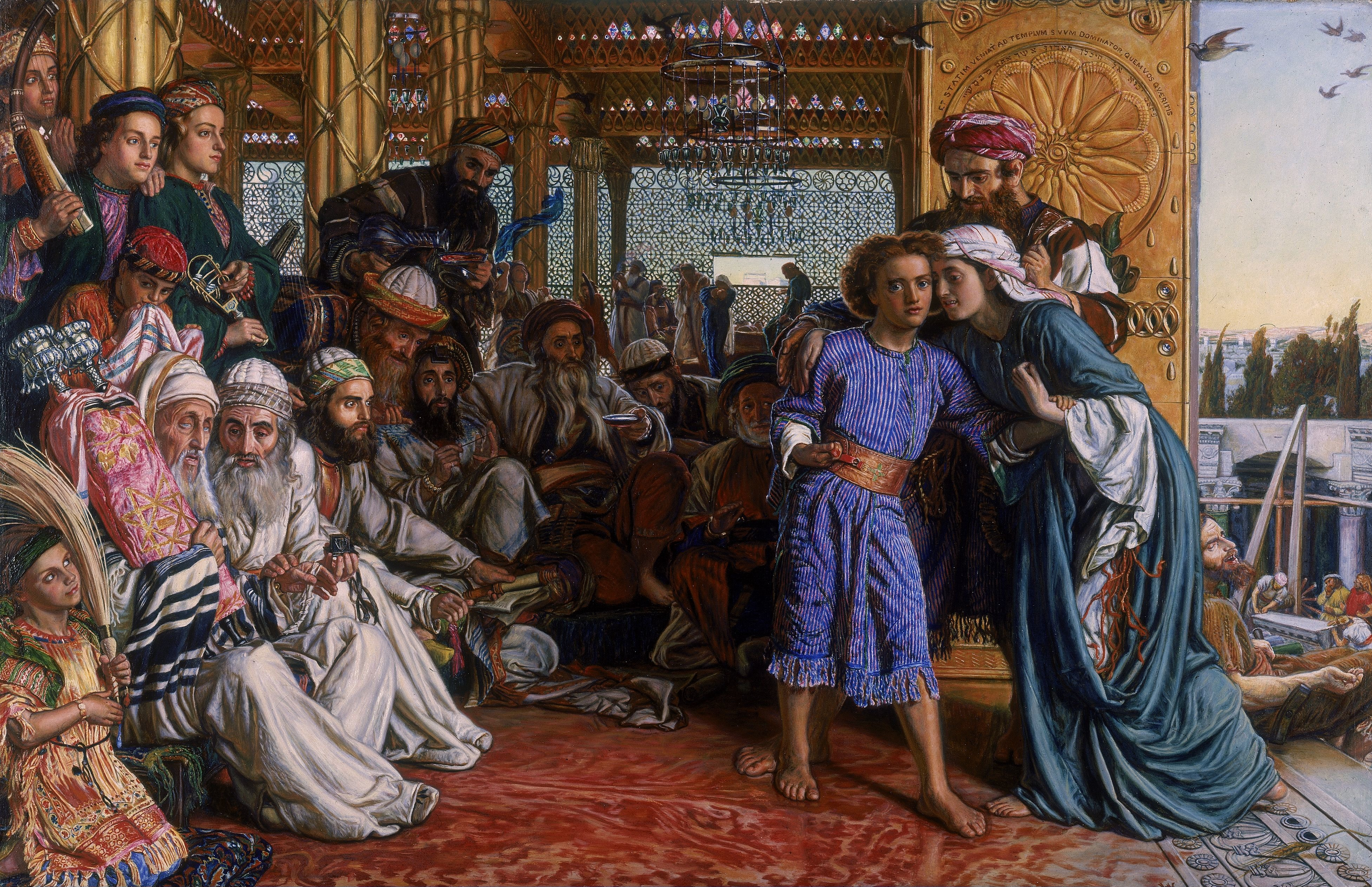
William Holman Hunt, The Finding of the Saviour in the Temple, 1854–1860, Birmingham Museum & Art Gallery, Birmingham

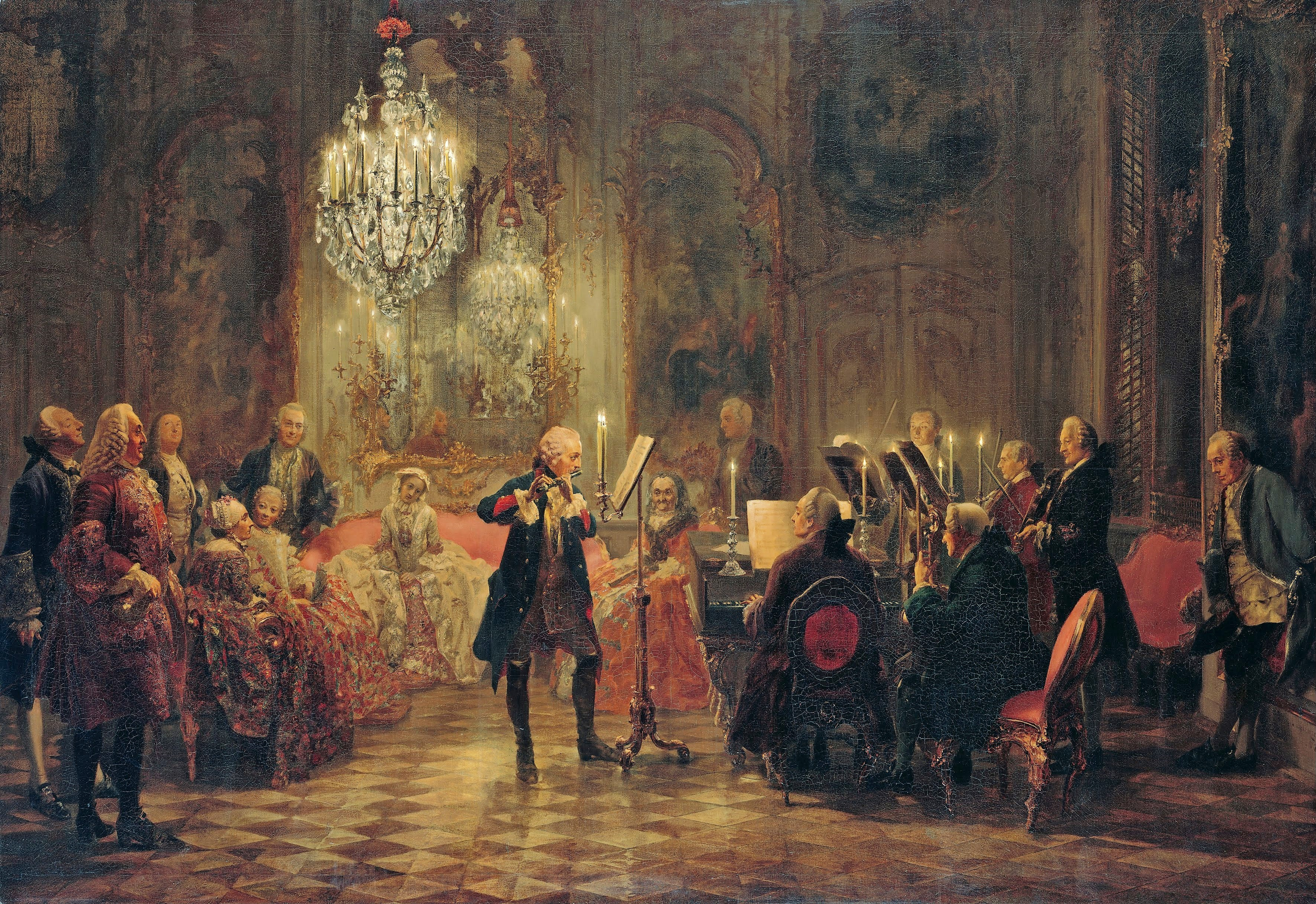
Adolph Menzel, Flute concerto of Fredrick the Great, c. 1852

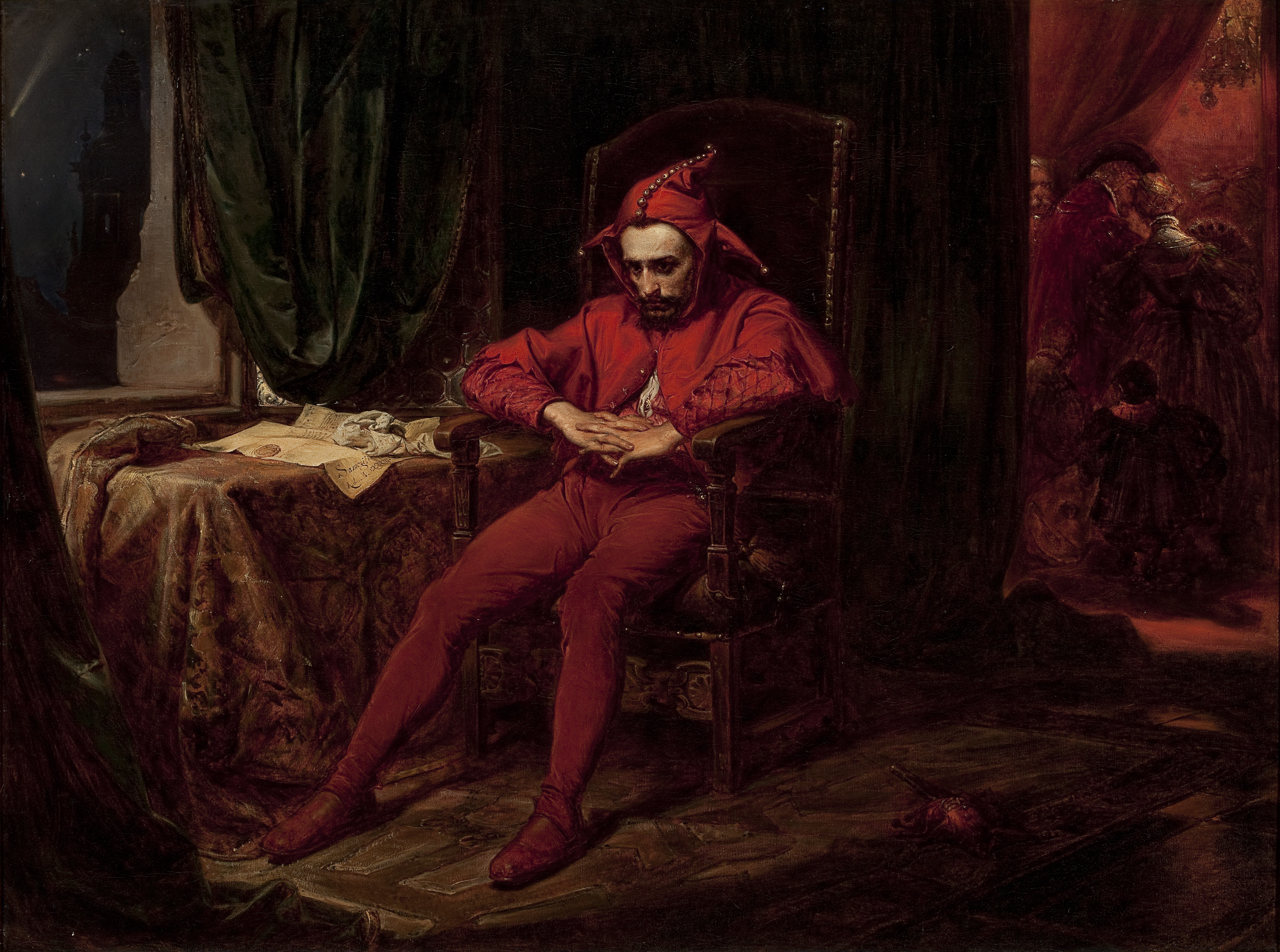
Jan Matejko, Stanczyk, 1862, National Museum in Warsaw

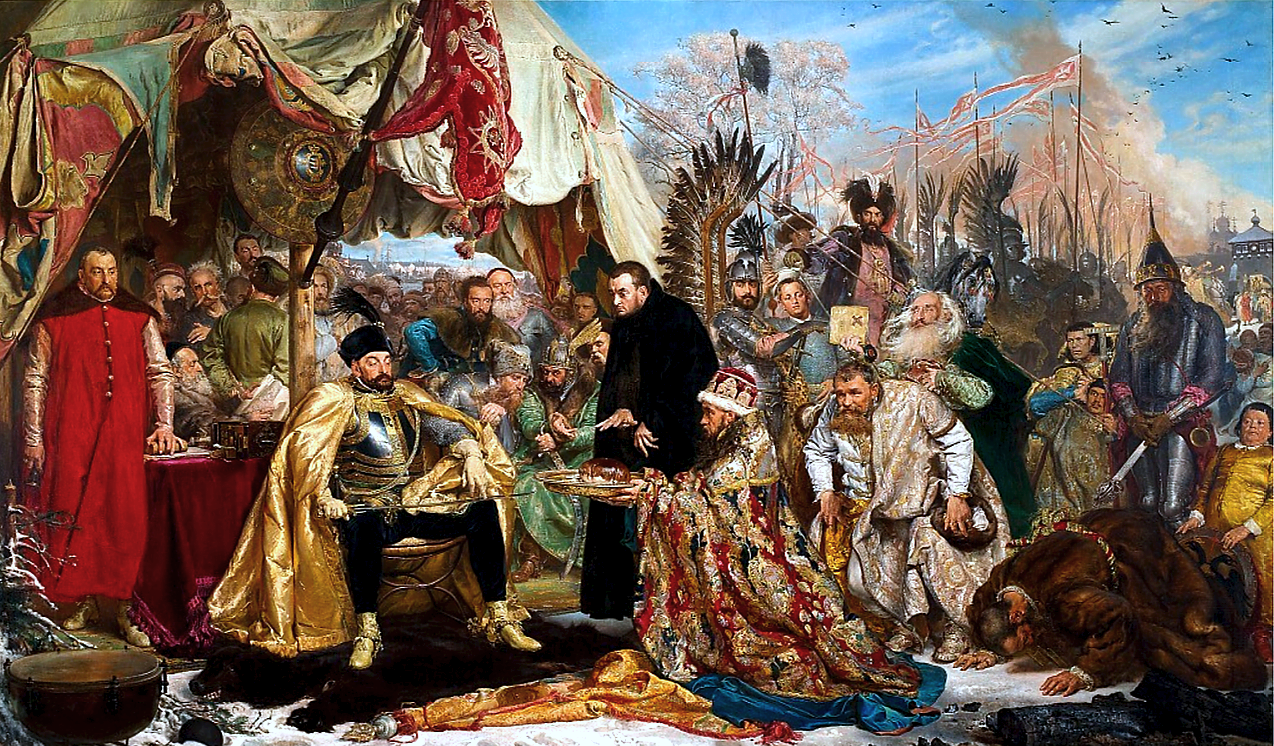
Jan Matejko, Stefan Batory at Pskov, oil painting, (1872)

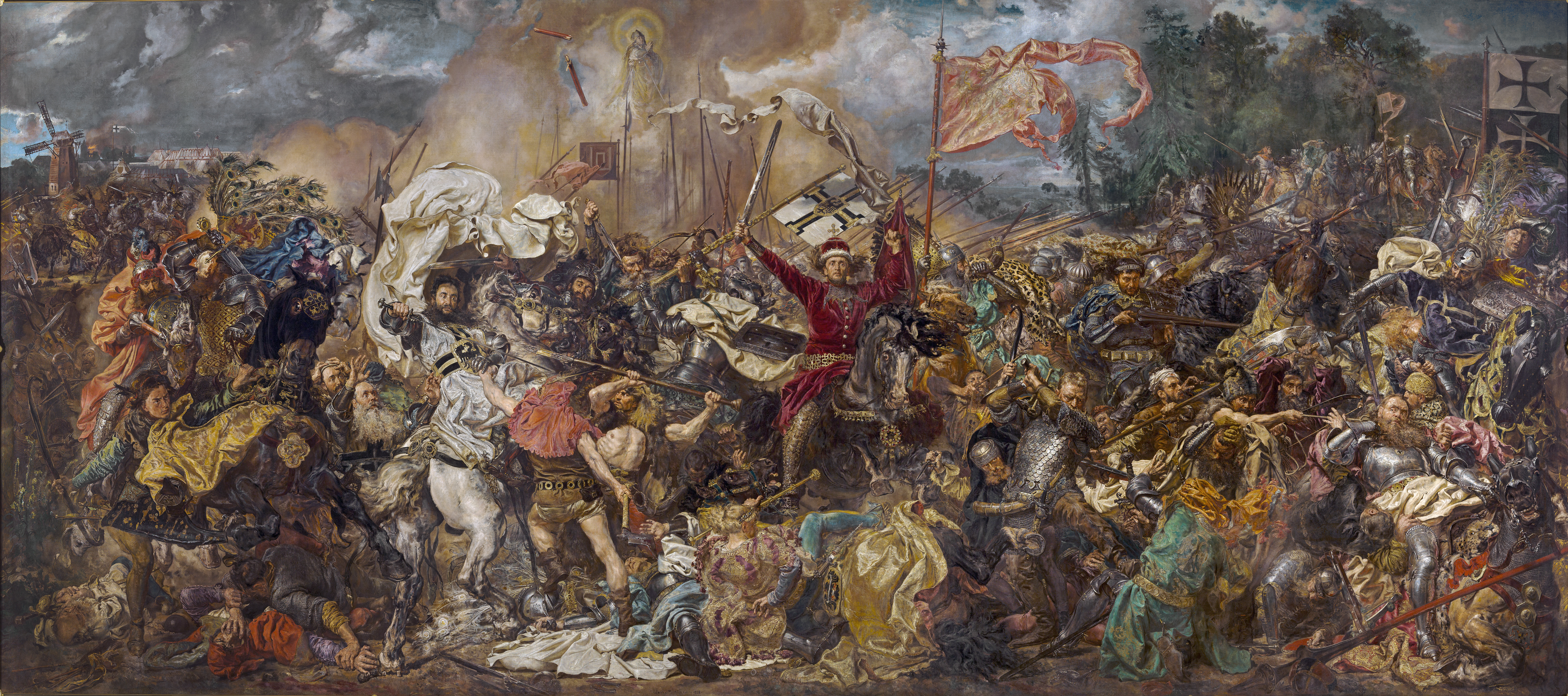
Battle of Grunwald by Jan Matejko, 1878, National Museum in Warsaw

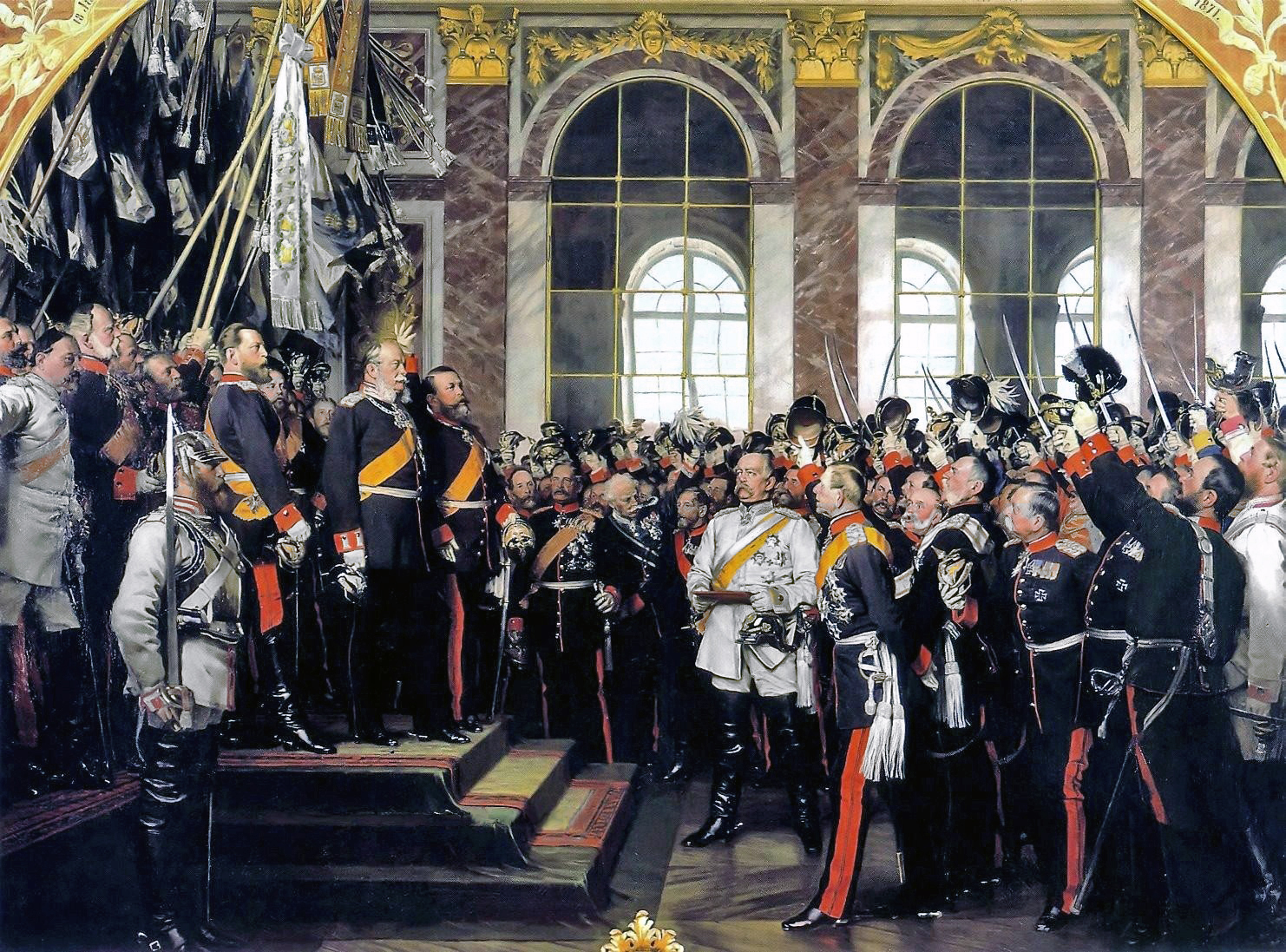
Anton von Werner, Proclamation of the German Empire, 1885

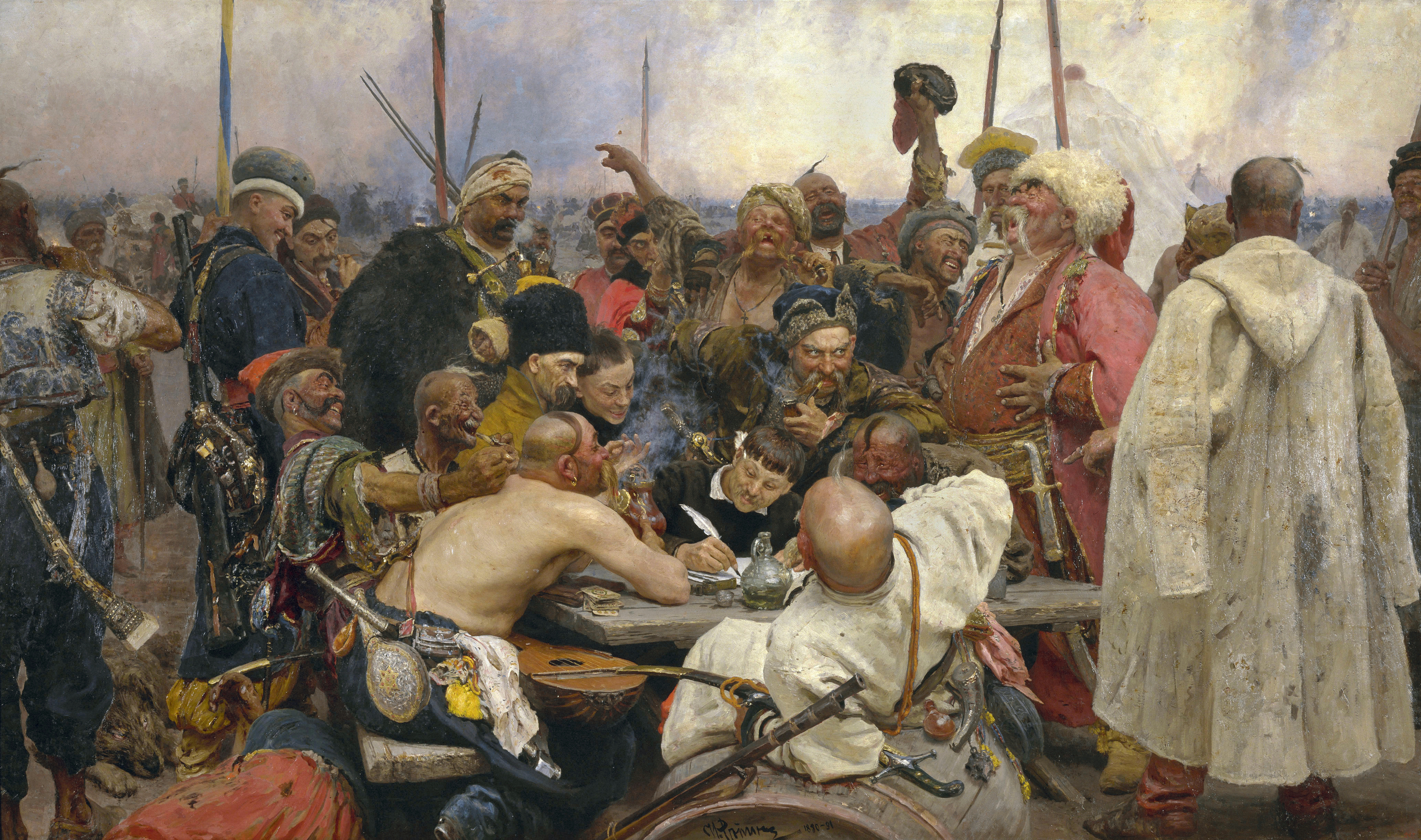
Ilya Repin, Reply of the Zaporozhian Cossacks, 1880–1891, State Russian Museum, St. Petersburg

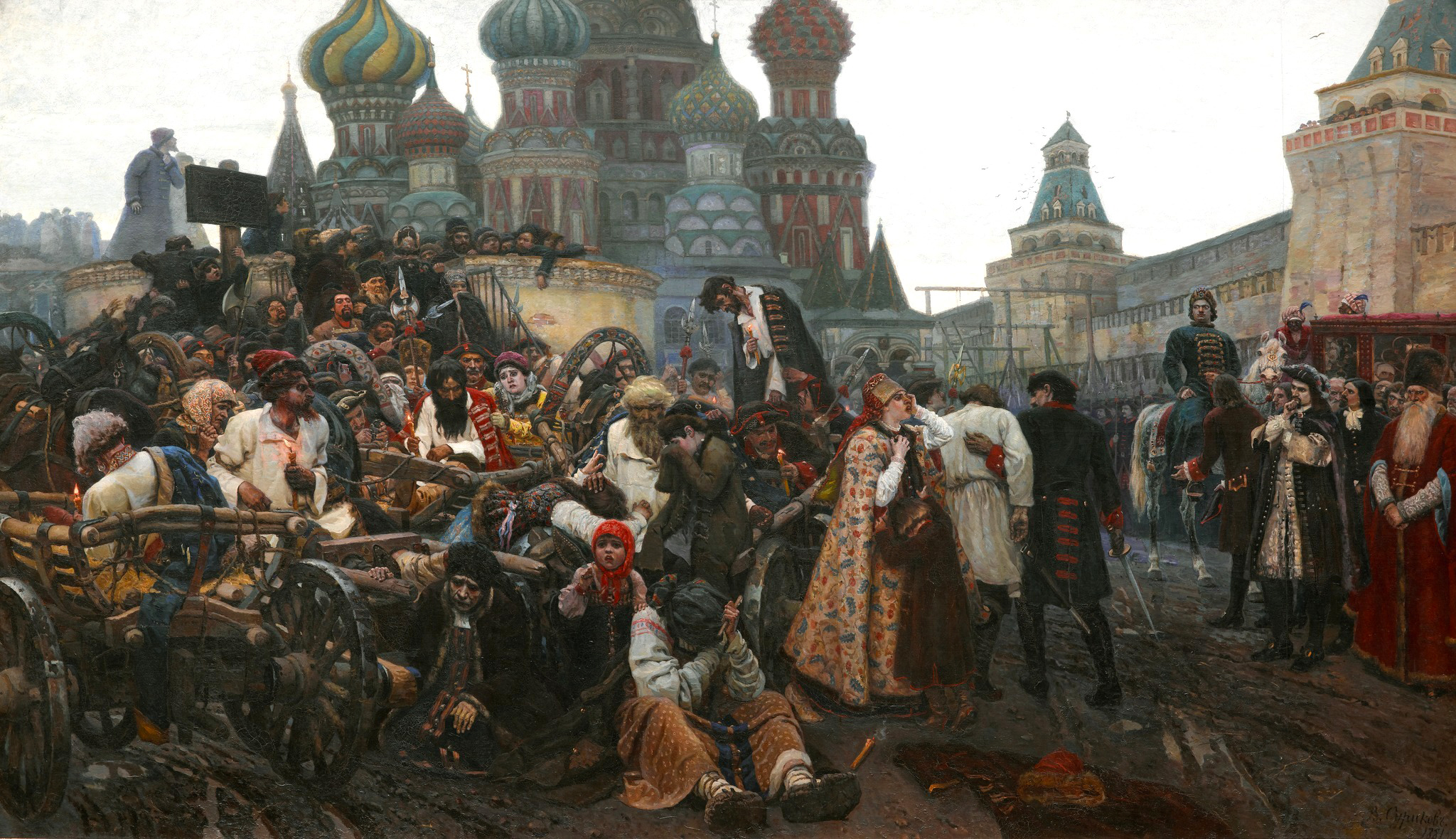
Vasily Surikov, Morning of Streltsy's Execution, 1881, Tretyakov Gallery, Moscow

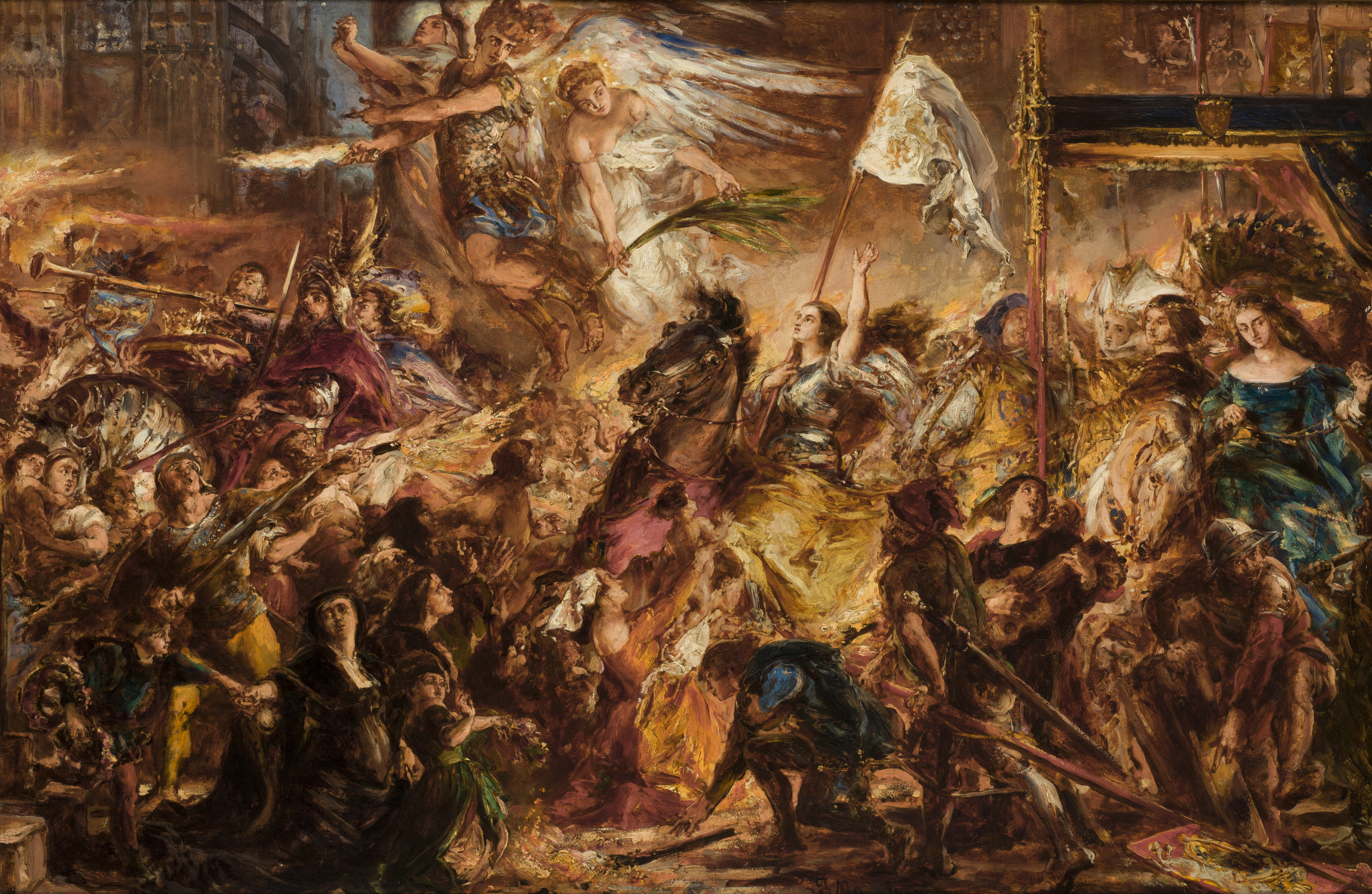
Jan Matejko, The Maid of Orléans, 1886, National Museum, Poznań

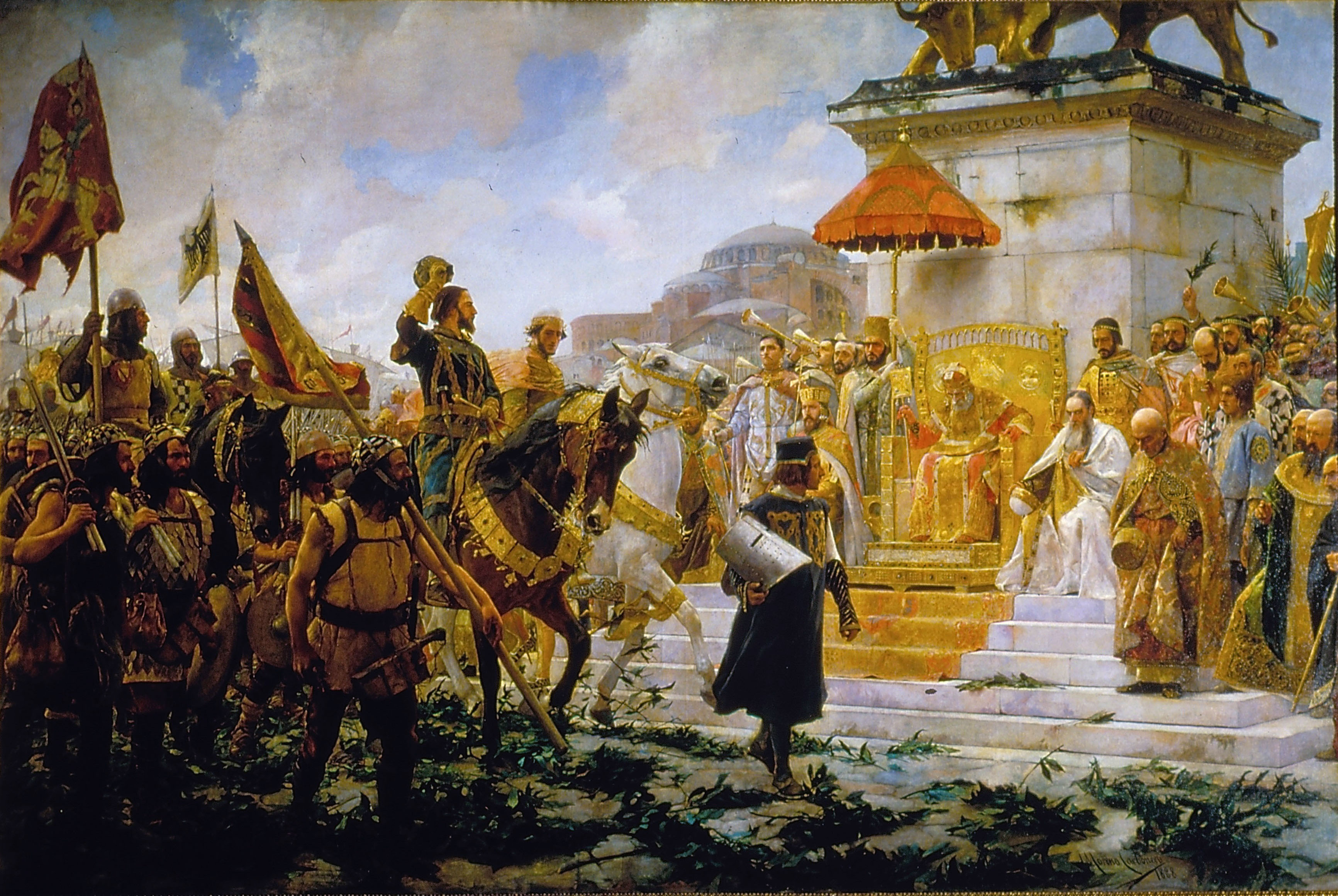
José Moreno Carbonero, 1888, The Entry of Roger de Flor in Constantinople, Senate Palace, Madrid

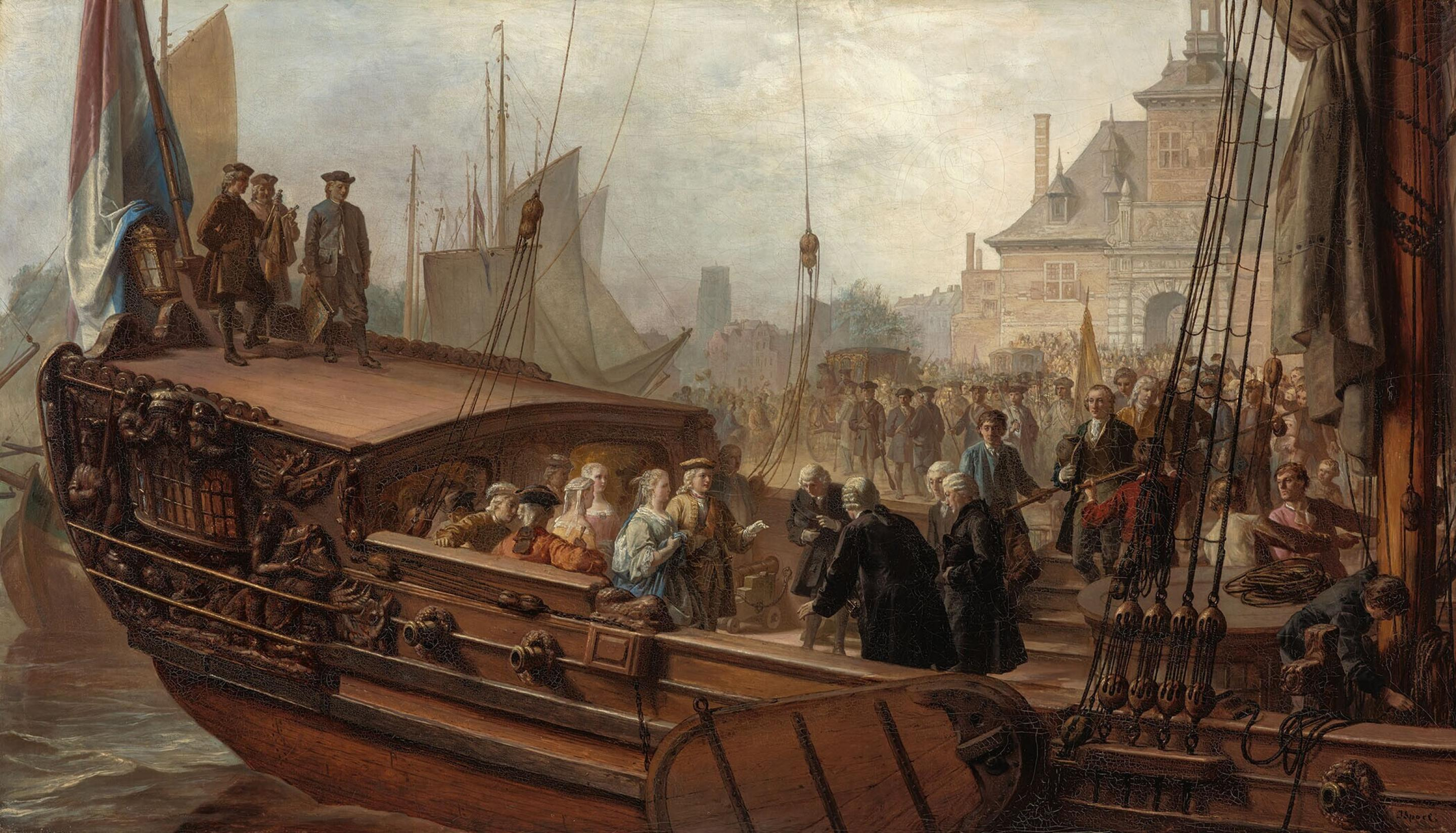
Jacob Spoel, 1867, The Welcome by the Mayors of Rotterdam of William IV, Prince of Orange and his Consort Anne of Great Britain

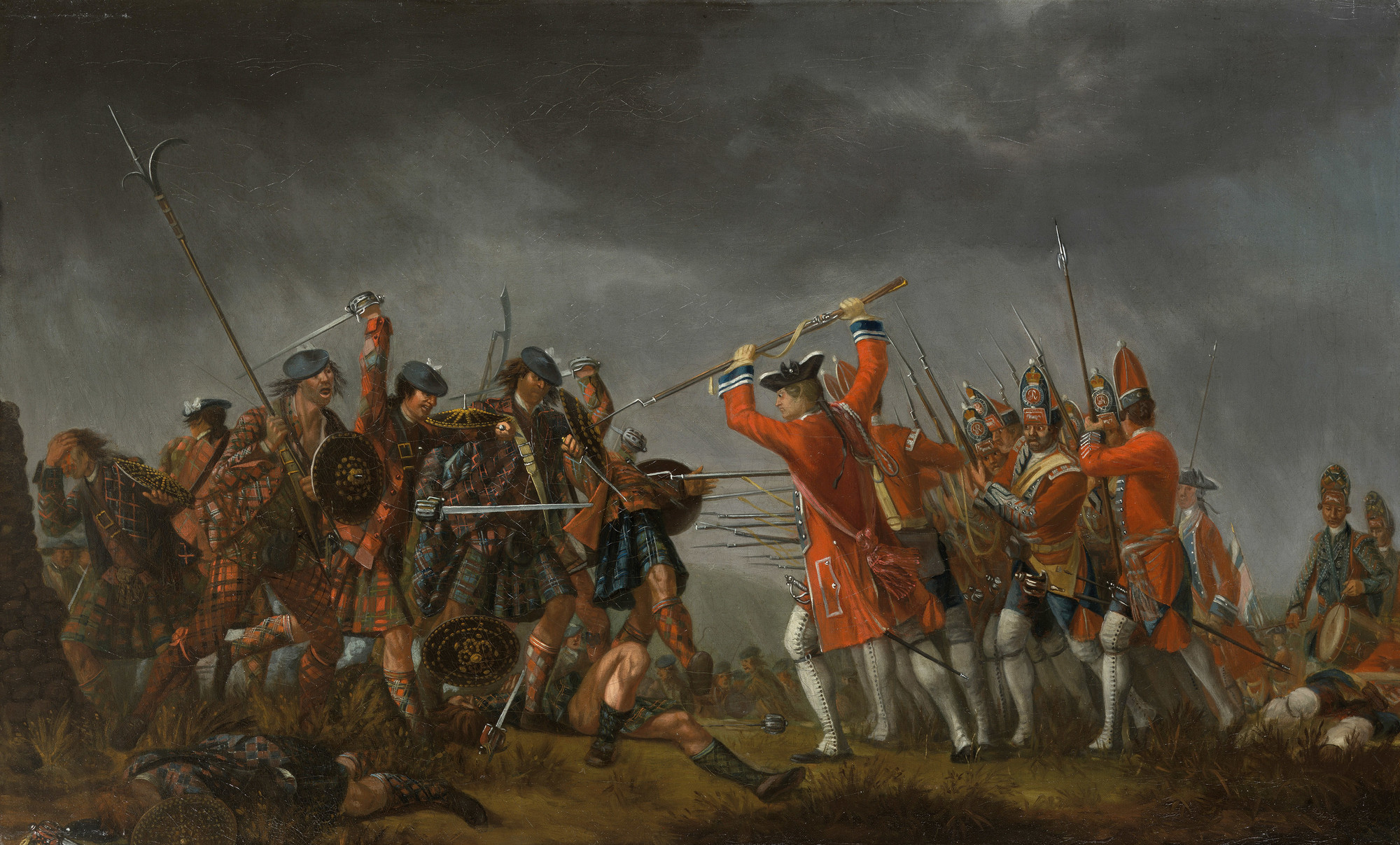
David Morier, An Incident in the Rebellion of 1745, 1746, Palace of Holyroodhouse

== See also ==
- Classicism
- Genre painting
- History of painting
- List of Orientalist artists
