= Bathsheba at the Bath =

Painting by David Wilkie

- Artist: David Wilkie
- Year: 1817
- Type: Oil on canvas, history painting
- Dimensions: 40.3 cm × 53.2 cm (15.9 in × 20.9 in)
- Location: Walker Art Gallery, Liverpool

Bathsheba at the Bath is an 1817 history painting by the British artist David Wilkie. It depicts the biblical scene of Bathsheba being spied on by the Israeli king David while bathing, entrancing him. Wilkie was influenced by the style of Rembrandt for this painting. The subject had been a popular one since the Renaissance era, second only to David's battle against Goliath in depictions of the monarch. It was an unusual subject matter for Wilkie nonetheless, who was best known at this time for small genre paintings of everyday life.

Wilkie exhibited the painting at the British Institution in 1818 where it was criticised by the press including the Radical newspaper The Examiner. Today it is in the collection of the Walker Art Gallery in Liverpool, having been acquired in 1932.

== Bibliography ==
- Jones, Tom Devonshire, Murray, Linda & Murray, Peter. The Oxford Dictionary of Christian Art and Architecture. OUP Oxford, 2013.
- Turner, Nicholas. European Drawings 4: Catalogue of the Collections. Getty Publications, 2001.
- Tromans, Nicholas. David Wilkie: The People's Painter. Edinburgh University Press, 2007.
- Wright, Christopher, Gordon, Catherine May & Smith, Mary Peskett. British and Irish Paintings in Public Collections: An Index of British and Irish Oil Paintings by Artists Born Before 1870 in Public and Institutional Collections in the United Kingdom and Ireland.
