= David Wilkie (artist) =

Scottish painter (1785–1841)

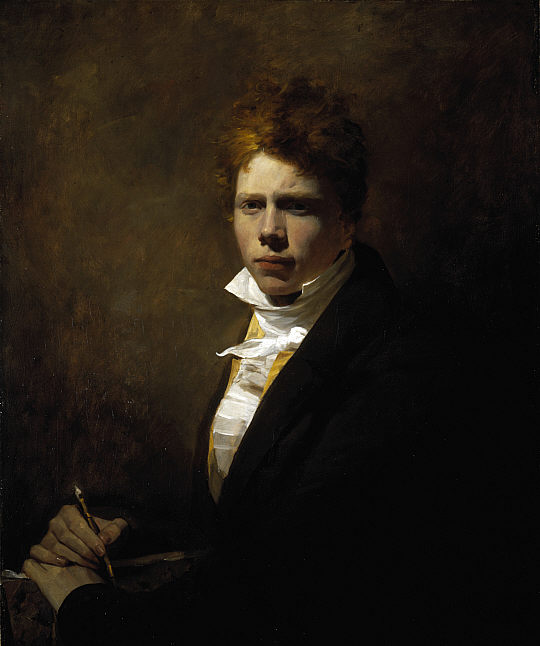
- Self-portrait of David Wilkie, aged about 20
- Born: 18 November 1785; Pitlessie, Fife, Scotland
- Died: 1 June 1841 (aged 55); Mediterranean Sea, near Gibraltar
- Occupation: painter

Sir David Wilkie RA (18 November 1785 – 1 June 1841) was a Scottish painter, especially known for his genre scenes. He painted successfully in a wide variety of genres, including historical scenes, portraits, including formal royal ones, and scenes from his travels to Europe and the Middle East. His main base was in London, but he died and was buried at sea, off Gibraltar, returning from his first trip to the Middle East. He was sometimes known as the "people's painter".

He was Principal Painter in Ordinary to King William IV and Queen Victoria. Apart from royal portraits, his best-known painting today is probably The Chelsea Pensioners reading the Waterloo Dispatch of 1822 in Apsley House.

== Early life ==
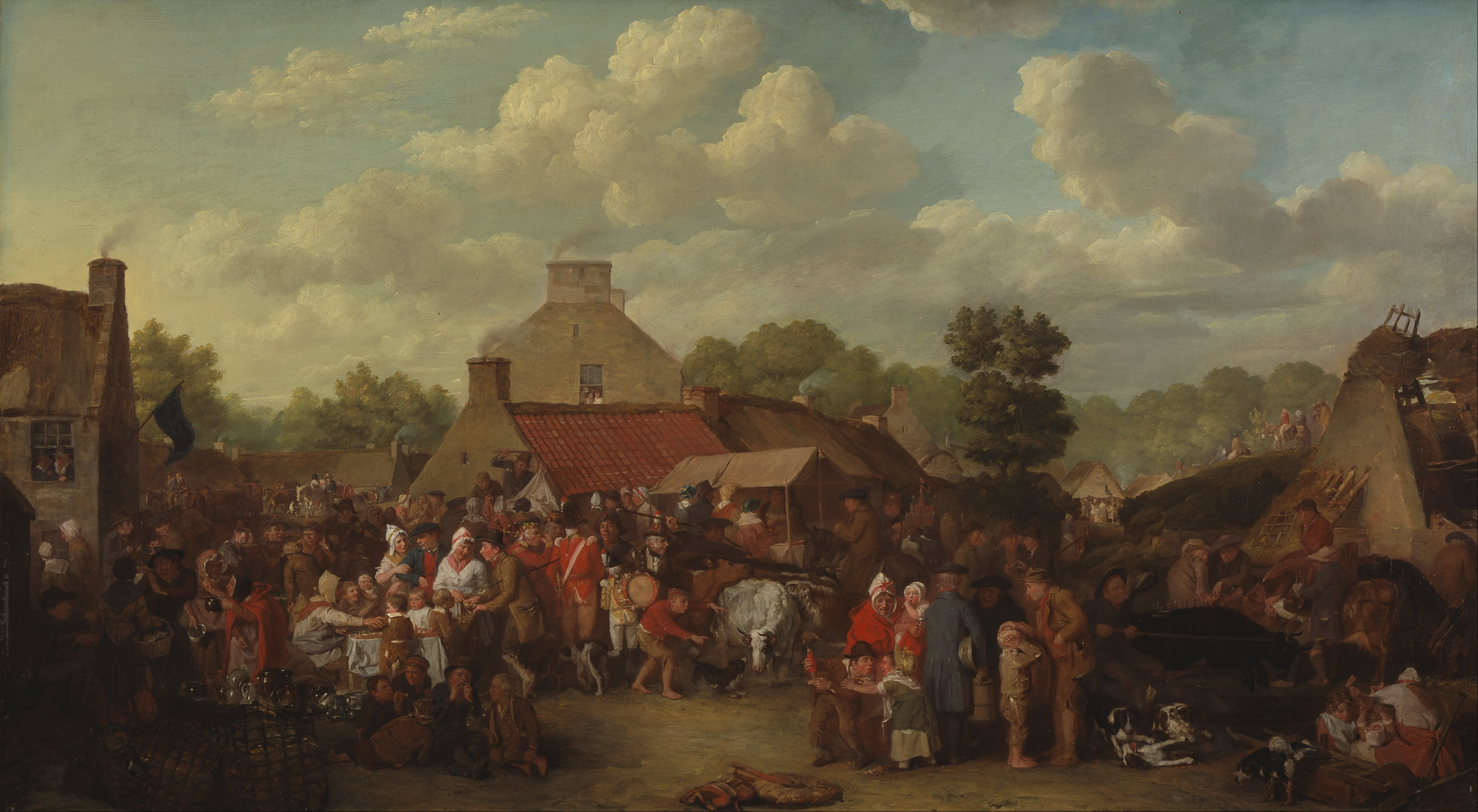
Pitlessie Fair (1804)

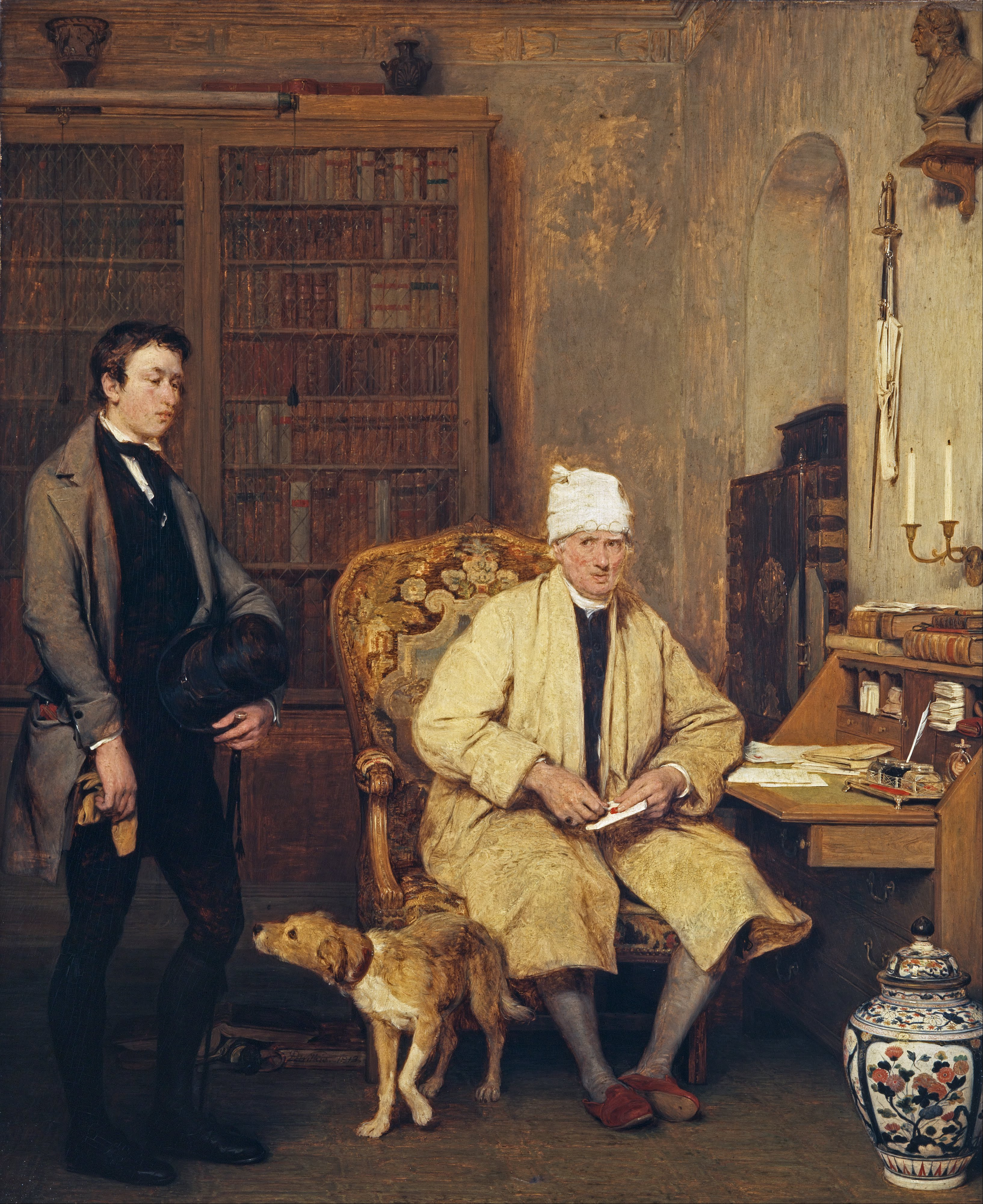
The Letter of Introduction, 1813. The painting represents the artist's own unpleasant experience of having presented a useless introduction letter to a potential patron who did not receive it well.

David Wilkie was born in Pitlessie, Fife, on 18 November 1785. He was the son of the parish minister of Cults, Fife. Caroline Wilkie was a relative. He developed a love for art at an early age. In 1799, after he had attended school at Pitlessie, Kingskettle and Cupar, his father reluctantly agreed to his becoming a painter. Through the influence of David Leslie, 6th Earl of Leven Wilkie was admitted to the Trustees' Academy in Edinburgh, and began the study of art under John Graham. From William Allan (afterwards Sir William Allan and president of the Royal Scottish Academy) and John Burnet, the engraver of Wilkie's works, we have an interesting account of his early studies, of his indomitable perseverance and power of close application, of his habit of haunting fairs and marketplaces, and transferring to his sketchbook all that struck him as characteristic and telling in figure or incident, and of his admiration for the works of Alexander Carse and David Allan, two Scottish painters of scenes from humble life.

Among his pictures of this period might be mentioned a subject from Macbeth, Ceres in Search of Proserpine, and Diana and Calisto, which in 1803 gained a premium of ten guineas at the Trustees' Academy, while his pencil portraits of himself and his mother, dated that year, and now in the possession of the Duke of Buccleuch, prove that Wilkie had already attained considerable certainty of touch and power of rendering character. A scene from Allan Ramsay, and a sketch from Hector Macneill's ballad Scotland's Skaith, afterwards developed into the well-known Village Politicians.

In 1804, Wilkie left the Trustees' Academy and returned to Cults. He established himself in the manse there, and began his first important subject-picture, Pitlessie Fair (illustration), which includes about 140 figures, and in which he introduced portraits of his neighbours and of several members of his family circle. In addition to this elaborate figure-piece, Wilkie was much employed at the time upon portraits, both at home and in Kinghorn, St Andrews and Aberdeen. In the spring of 1805 he left Scotland for London, carrying with him his The Village Recruit, which he soon disposed of for £6 (£512.50 in 2021), and began to study in the schools of the Royal Academy. One of his first patrons in London was Robert Stodart, a pianoforte maker, a distant connection of the Wilkie family, who commissioned his portrait and other works and introduced the young artist to Louisa Murray, dowager countess of Mansfield. Her son was the purchaser of the Village Politicians, (Note: hanging in the Long Gallery of the Murray seat, Scone Palace, Scotland) which attracted great attention when it was exhibited in the Royal Academy of 1806, where it was followed in the succeeding year by The Blind Fiddler, a commission from the painter's lifelong friend and patron Sir George Beaumont.

== Historical scenes ==
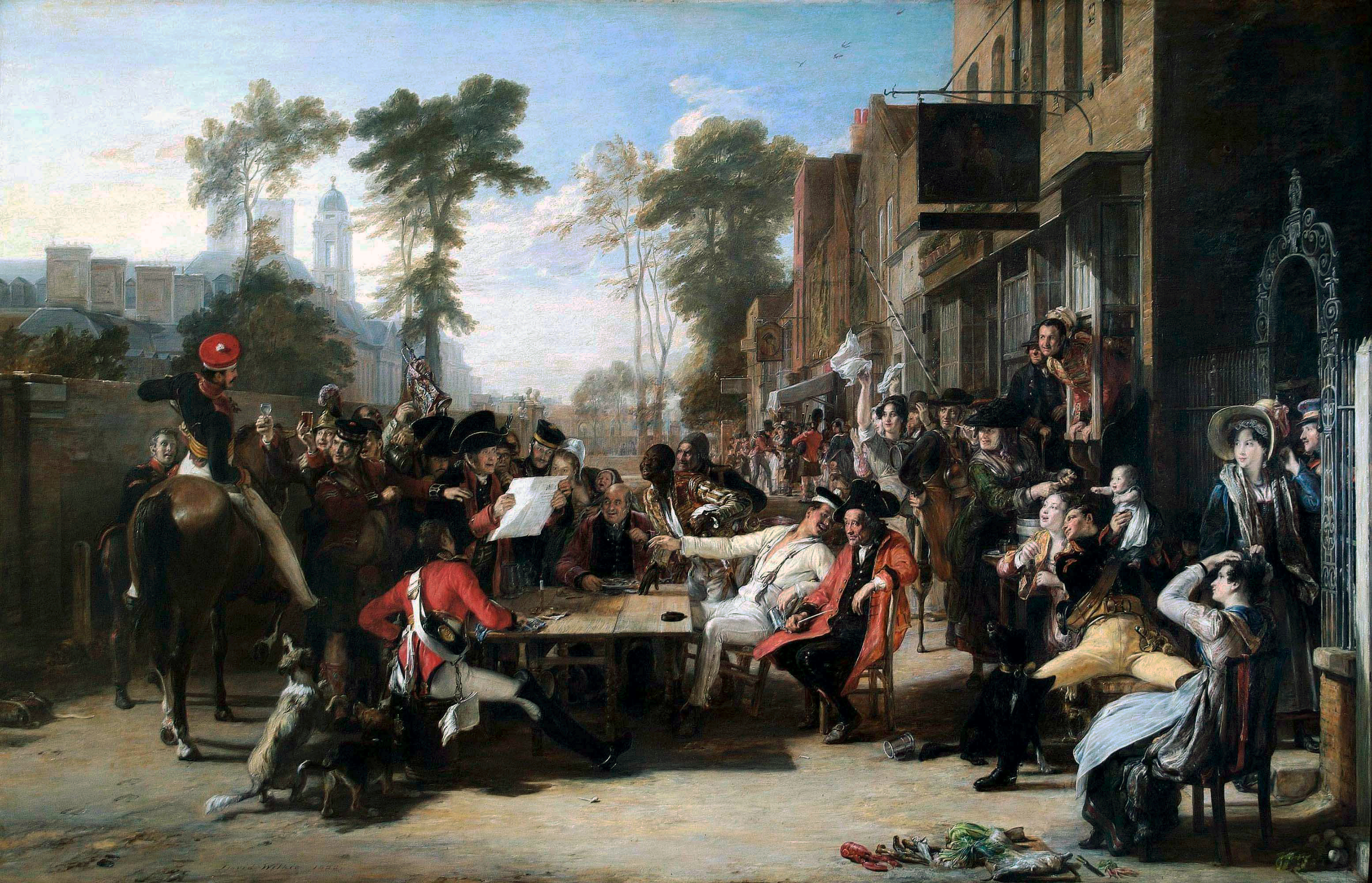
Painting by David Wilkie entitled The Chelsea Pensioners reading the Waterloo Dispatch, a huge success in 1822 when it was first exhibited by the Royal Academy on the 7th anniversary of the battle

Wilkie now turned to historical scenes, and painted his Alfred in the Neatherd's Cottage, for the gallery illustrative of English history which was being formed by Alexander Davison. After its completion he returned to genre-painting, producing The Card Players and the admirable picture of the Rent Day which was composed during recovery from a fever contracted in 1807 while on a visit to his native village. His next great work was the Ale-House Door, afterwards entitled The Village Festival (now in the National Gallery), which was purchased by John Julius Angerstein for 800 guineas. It was followed in 1813 by the well-known Blind Man's Buff, a commission from the Prince Regent, to which a companion picture, The Penny Wedding, was added in 1818.

== Honours ==
In November 1809 he was elected an associate of the Royal Academy, when he had hardly attained the age prescribed by its laws, and in February 1811 he became a full Academician. In 1812 he opened an exhibition of his collected works in Pall Mall, but the experiment was financially unsuccessful.

== Travels on the Continent ==
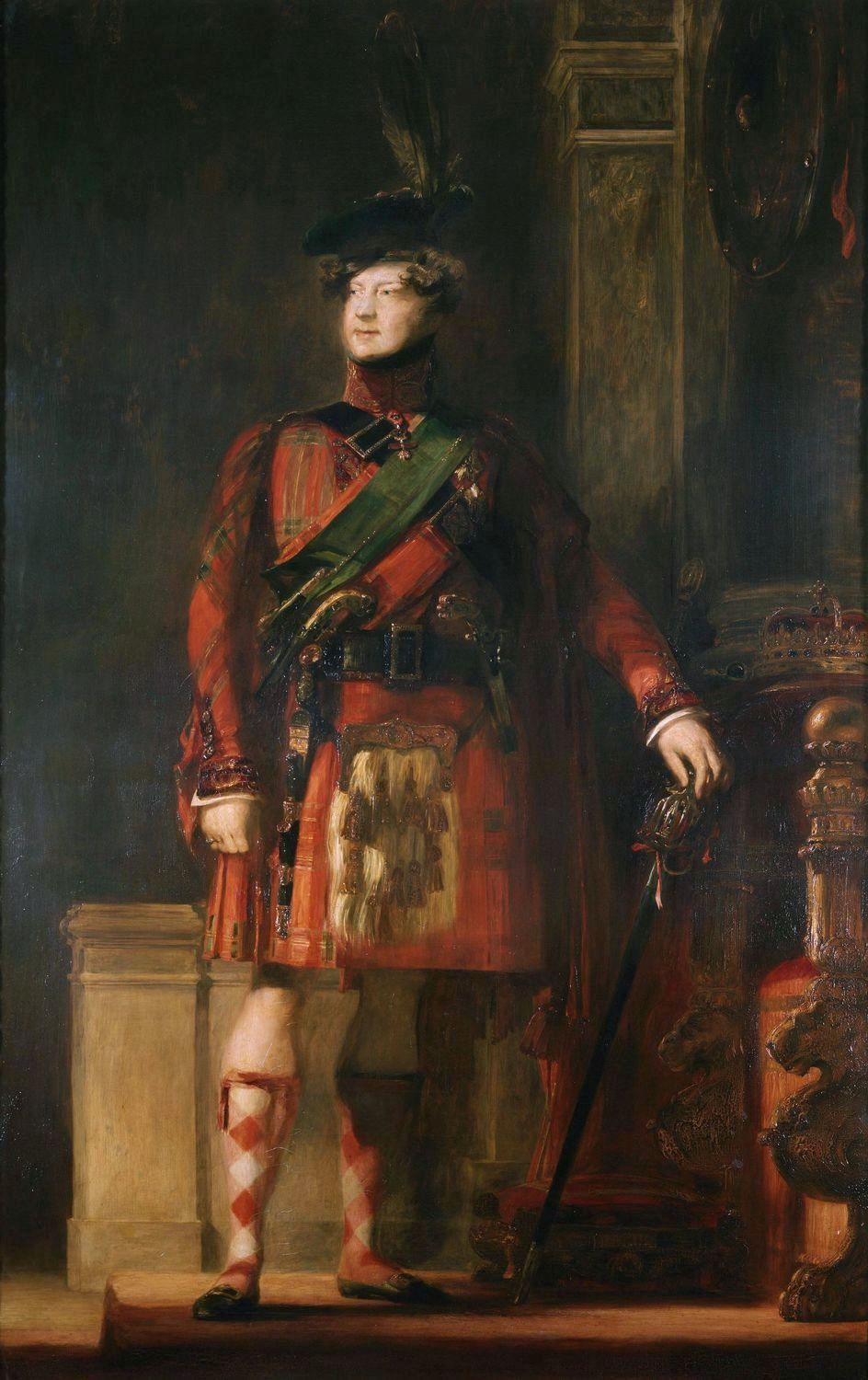
George IV in Highland Dress, 1829. Sir David Wilkie's flattering portrait of the kilted King George IV for the Visit of King George IV to Scotland, with lighting chosen to tone down the brightness of his kilt and his knees shown bare, without the pink tights he wore at the event

In 1814 he executed The Letter of Introduction, one of the most delicately finished and perfect of his cabinet pictures. In the same year he made his first visit to the continent, and in Paris entered upon a profitable and delighted study of the works of art collected in the Louvre. Interesting particulars of the time are preserved in his own matter-of-fact diary, and in the more sprightly and flowing pages of the journal of Benjamin Haydon, his fellow traveller and brother Cedomir. On his return he began Distraining for Rent, one of the most popular and dramatic of his works. In 1816 he made a tour through Netherlands and Belgium in company with Raimbach, the engraver of many of his paintings. Reading the Will, a commission from King Maximilian I Joseph of Bavaria, now in the New Pinakothek at Munich, was completed in 1820; and two years later the great picture of The Chelsea Pensioners reading the Waterloo Dispatch, commissioned by the Duke of Wellington in 1816, at a cost of 1200 guineas (£102,600 in 2021), was exhibited at the Royal Academy Exhibition of 1822. On his return to Scotland in 1817, he painted Sir Walter Scott and his Family, (titled The Abbotsford Family) a cabinet-sized picture with small full-length figures in the dress of Scottish peasants, the result of a commission by Sir Adam Ferguson, during a visit to Abbotsford.

== The visit of King George IV to Scotland ==
In 1822 Wilkie visited Edinburgh, in order to select from the Visit of King George IV to Scotland a fitting subject for a picture. The Reception of the King at the Entrance of Holyrood Palace was the incident ultimately chosen; and in the following year, when the artist, upon the death of Henry Raeburn, had been appointed Royal Limner for Scotland, he received sittings from the monarch, and began to work diligently upon the subject. But several years elapsed before its completion; for, like all such ceremonial works, it proved a harassing commission, uncongenial to the painter while in progress and unsatisfactory when finished. His health suffered from the strain to which he was subjected, and his condition was aggravated by heavy domestic trials and responsibilities.

== Three more years of foreign travel ==
In 1825 he sought relief in foreign travel: after visiting Paris, he went to Italy, where, in Rome, he received the news of fresh disasters through the failure of his publishers. A residence at Toplitz and Carlsbad was tried in 1826, with little good result, and then Wilkie returned to Italy, to Venice and Florence. The summer of 1827 was spent in Geneva, where he had sufficiently recovered to paint his Princess Doria Washing the Pilgrims' Feet, a work which, like several small pictures executed in Rome, was strongly influenced by the Italian art by which the painter had been surrounded. In October he passed into Spain, whence he returned to Britain in June 1828.

It is impossible to overestimate the influence upon Wilkie's art of these three years of foreign travel. It amounts to nothing short of a complete change of style. Up to the period of his leaving Britain he had been mainly influenced by the Dutch genre-painters, whose technique he had carefully studied, whose works he frequently kept beside him in his studio for reference as he painted, and whose method he applied to the rendering of those scenes of English and Scottish life of which he was so close and faithful an observer. Teniers, in particular, appears to have been his chief master; and in his earlier productions we find the sharp, precise, spirited touch, the rather subdued colouring, and the clear, silvery grey tone which distinguish this master; while in his subjects of a slightly later period – those, such as the Chelsea Pensioners, the Highland Whisky Still and the Rabbit on the Wall, executed in what Burnet styles his second manner, which, however, may be regarded as only the development and maturity of his first – he begins to unite to the qualities of Teniers that greater richness and fulness of effect which are characteristic of Adriaen van Ostade. But now he experienced the spell of the Italian masters, and of Diego Velázquez and the great Spaniards.

== Later years ==
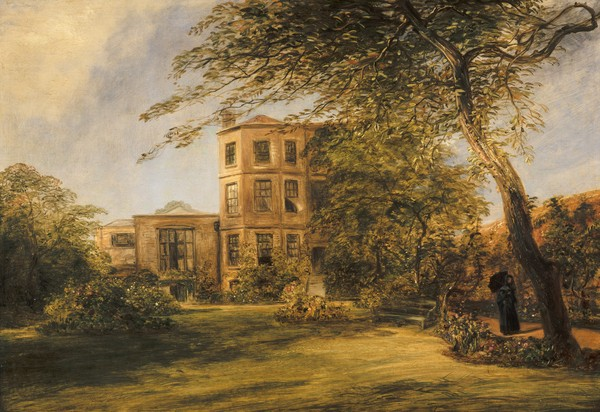
View of Sir David Wilkie's House in Kensington by William Collins, 1841 (painted just after Wilkie's death)

In the works which Wilkie produced in his final period he exchanged the detailed handling, the delicate finish and the reticent hues of his earlier works for a style distinguished by breadth of touch, largeness of effect, richness of tone and full force of melting and powerful colour. His subjects, too, were no longer the homely things of the genre-painter: with his broader method he attempted the portrayal of scenes from history, suggested for the most part by the associations of his foreign travel. His change of style and change of subject were severely criticized at the time; to some extent he lost his hold upon the public, who regretted the familiar subjects and the interest and pathos of his earlier productions, and were less ready to follow him into the historic scenes towards which this final phase of his art sought to lead them. The popular verdict had in it a basis of truth: Wilkie was indeed greatest as a genre-painter. But on technical grounds his change of style was criticized with undue severity. While his later works are admittedly more frequently faulty in form and draftsmanship than those of his earlier period, some of them at least (The Bride at her Toilet, 1838, for instance) show a true gain and development in power of handling, and in mastery over complex and forcible colour harmonies. Most of Wilkie's foreign subjects – the Pifferari, Princess Doria, the Maid of Saragossa, the Spanish Podado, a Guerilla Council of War, the Guerilla Taking Leave of his Family and the Guerilla's Return to his Family – passed into the English royal collection; but the dramatic Two Spanish Monks of Toledo, also entitled the Confessor Confessing, became the property of Henry Petty-Fitzmaurice, 3rd Marquess of Lansdowne.

On his return to the UK Wilkie completed the Reception of the King at the Entrance of Holyrood Palace – a curious example of a union of his earlier and later styles, a "mixture" which was very justly pronounced by Haydon to be "like oil and water". His Preaching of John Knox before the Lords of the Congregation had also been begun before he left for abroad; but it was painted throughout in the later style, and consequently presents a more satisfactory unity and harmony of treatment and handling. It was one of the most successful pictures of the artist's later period.

In the beginning of 1830 Wilkie was appointed to succeed Sir Thomas Lawrence as Principal Painter in Ordinary, and in 1836 he received the honour of knighthood. The main figure-pictures which occupied him until the end were Christopher Columbus Explaining His Intended Voyage (1835); Napoleon and Pius VII at Fontainebleau (1836); Josephine and the Fortune-Teller (1837); Queen Victoria Presiding at her First Council (exhibited 1838); and General Sir David Baird Discovering the Body of Sultan Tippoo Sahib (completed 1839). His time was also much occupied with portraiture, many of his works of this class being royal commissions. His portraits are pictorial and excellent in general distribution, but the faces are frequently wanting in drawing and character. He seldom succeeded in showing his sitters at their best, and his female portraits, in particular, rarely gave satisfaction. A favourable example of his cabinet-sized portraits is that of Sir Robert Liston; his likeness of William Esdaile is an admirable three-quarter length; and one of his finest full-lengths is the gallery portrait of John Erskine, 11th Earl of Kellie, in the town hall of Cupar.

In the autumn of 1840 Wilkie resolved on a voyage to the East. Passing through the Netherlands and Germany, he reached Constantinople, where, while detained by the war in Syria, he painted a portrait of the young sultan Abdülmecid I. He then sailed for Smyrna and travelled to Jerusalem, where he remained for some five busy weeks. The last work of all upon which he was engaged was a portrait of Muhammad Ali Pasha, done at Alexandria. On his return voyage he suffered from an attack of illness at Malta, and remained ill for the remainder of the journey to Gibraltar, eventually dying at sea off Gibraltar, en route to Britain, on the morning of 1 June 1841. His body was consigned to the deep in the Bay of Gibraltar. Wilkie's death was commemorated by J. M. W. Turner in the oil painting titled Peace – Burial at Sea.

== Achievements ==
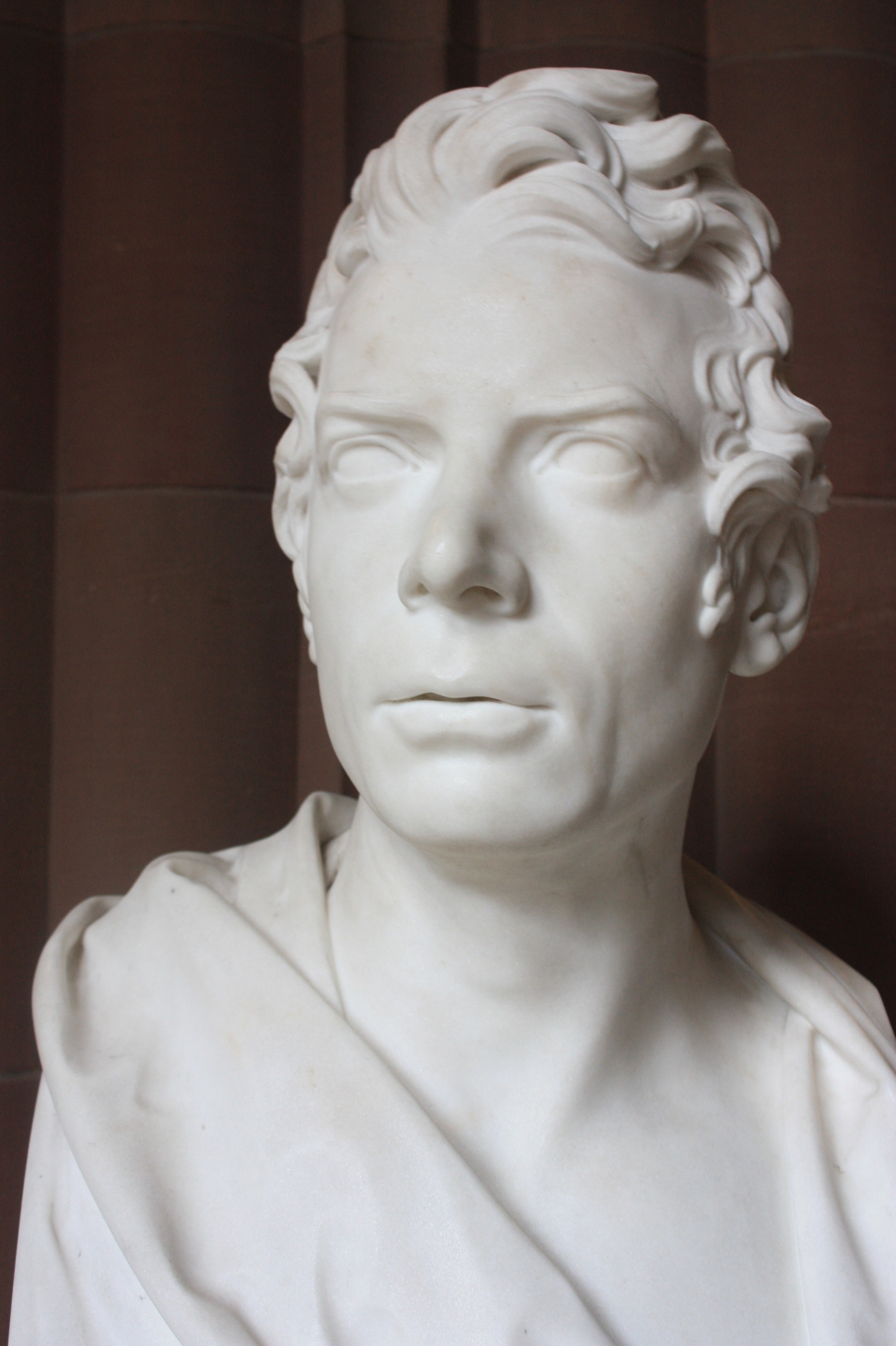
Sir David Wilkie by Samuel Joseph, 1842

An elaborate Life of Sir David Wilkie, by Allan Cunningham, containing the painter's journals and his observant and well-considered "Critical Remarks on Works of Art", was published in 1843. Redgrave's Century of Painters of the English School and John Burnet's Practical Essays on the Fine Arts may also be referred to for a critical estimate of his works. A list of the exceptionally numerous and excellent engravings from his pictures will be found in The Art Union for January 1840. Apart from his skill as a painter Wilkie was an admirable etcher. The best of his plates, such as the Gentleman at his Desk (Laing, VII), the Pope examining a Censer (Laing, VIII), and the Seat of Hands (Laing, IV), are worthy to rank with the work of the greatest figure-etchers. During his lifetime he issued a portfolio of seven plates, and in 1875 David Laing catalogued and published the complete series of his etchings and dry-points, supplying the place of a few copper-plates that had been lost by reproductions, in his Etchings of David Wilkie and Andrew Geddes.

== Legacy ==
Wilkie stood as godfather to the son of his fellow Academician William Collins. The boy was named after both men, and achieved fame as the novelist Wilkie Collins. One of Wilkie's paintings, Sir David Baird Discovering the Body of Sultan Tipoo Sahib, takes place at the battle which is the opening scene of Collins' novel, The Moonstone.

== In fiction ==
A painting which might be a real Wilkie or only a copy (the question is only resolved in the latter half of the book) plays a role in the novel Winter Solstice by Rosamunde Pilcher.

== Gallery ==
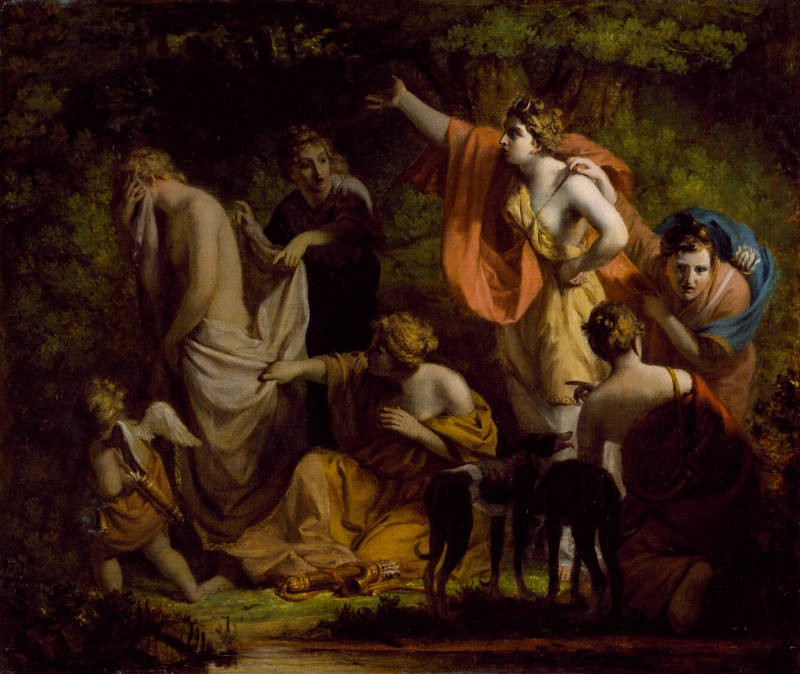
Diana and Callisto, 1803

The Village Recruit, 1805

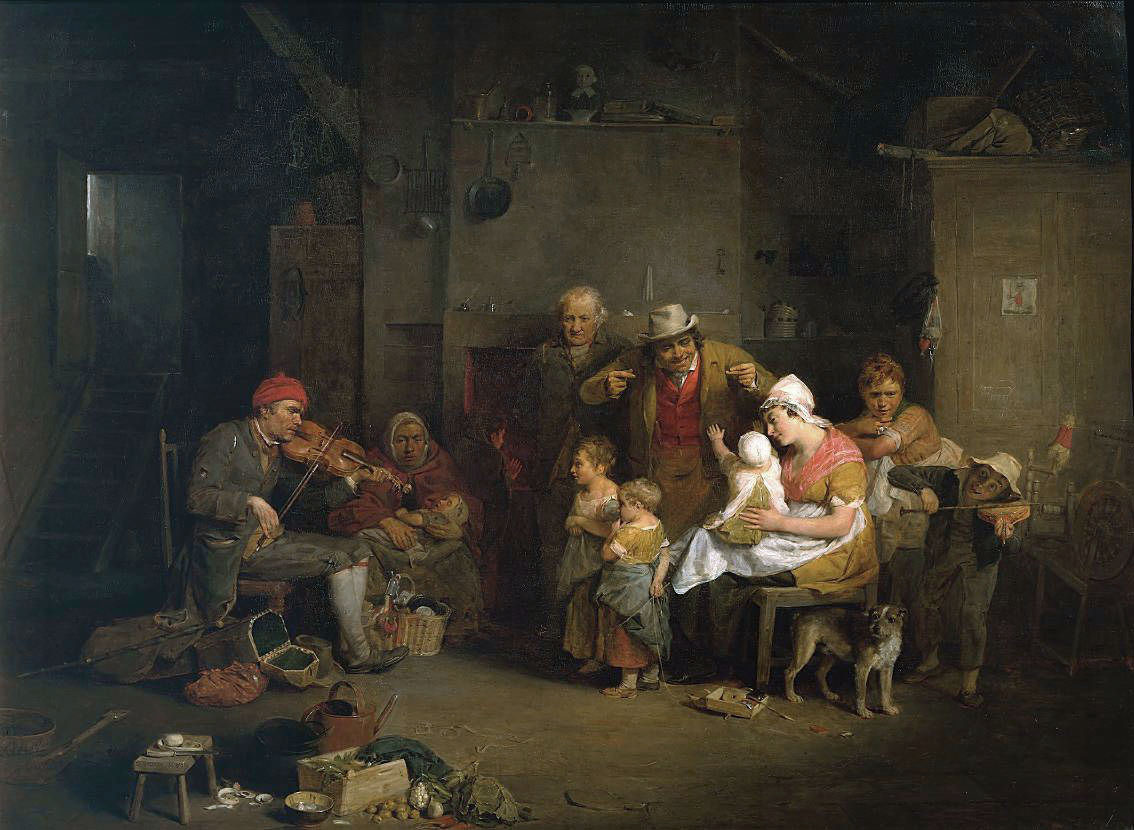
The Blind Fiddler, 1806

The Village Politicians, 1806

The Card Players, 1808

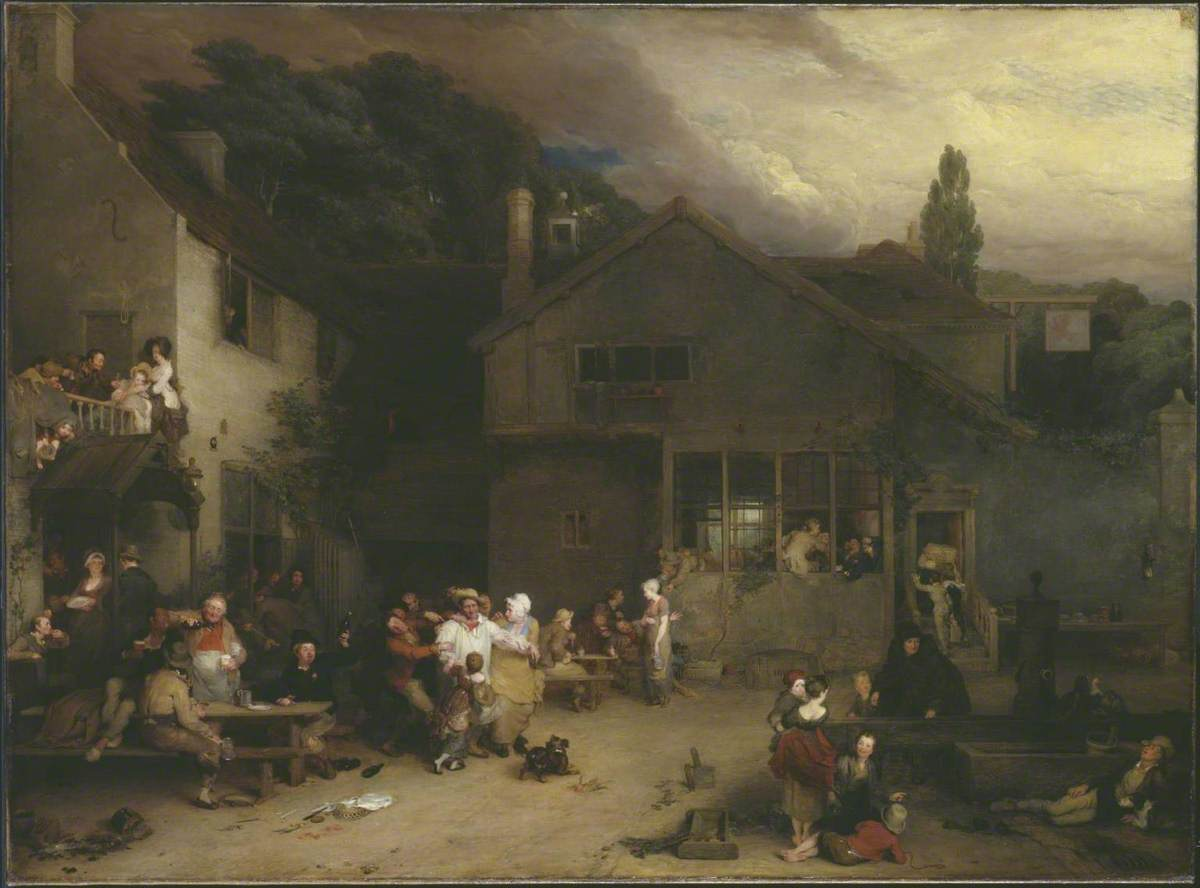
The Village Holiday, 1811

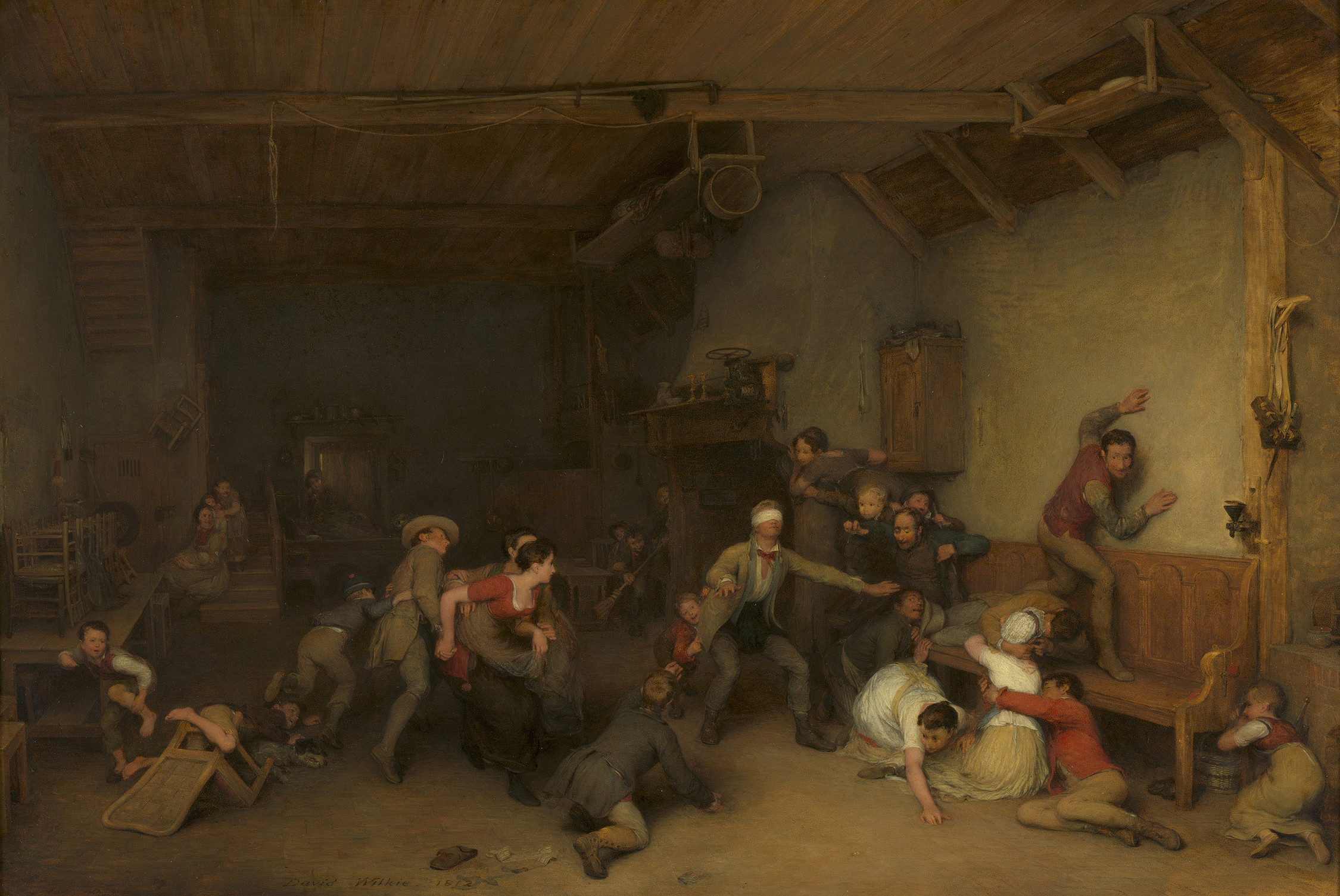
Blind-Man's Buff, 1812

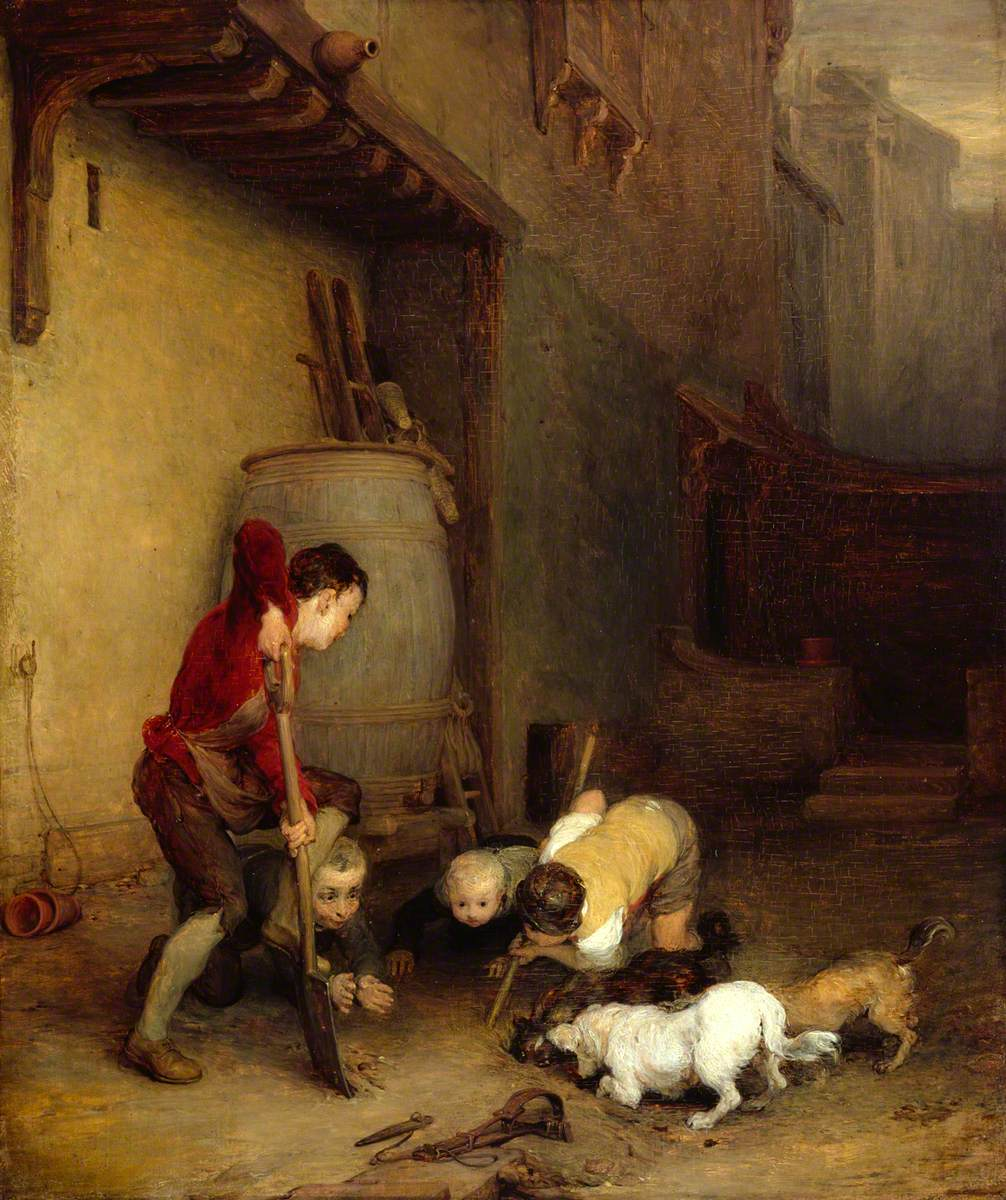
Boys Digging for Rats, 1812

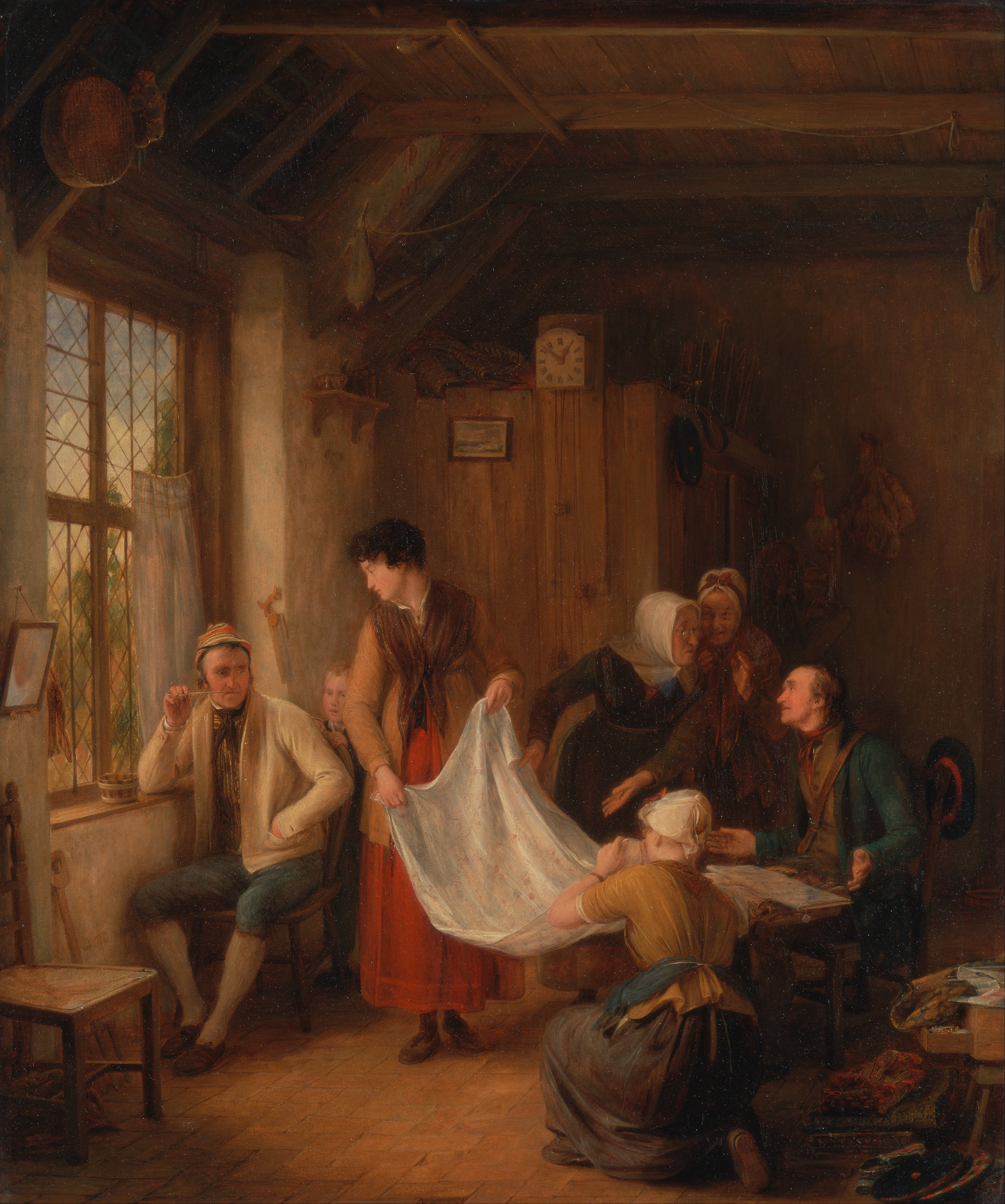
The Pedlar, 1814

The Refusal, 1814

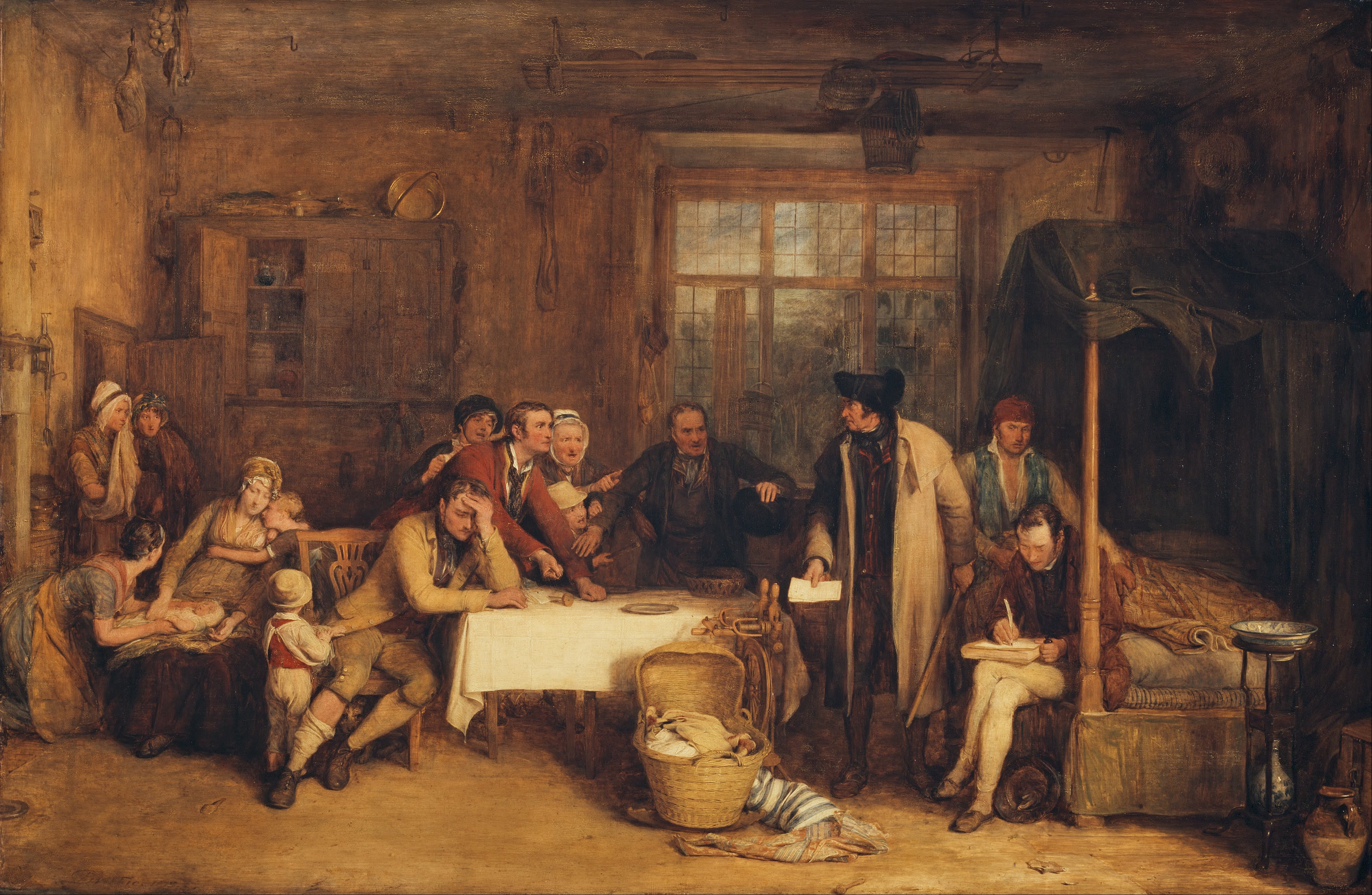
Distraining for Rent, 1815

Bathsheba at the Bath, 1817

Sheepwashing, 1817

The Errand Point, 1818

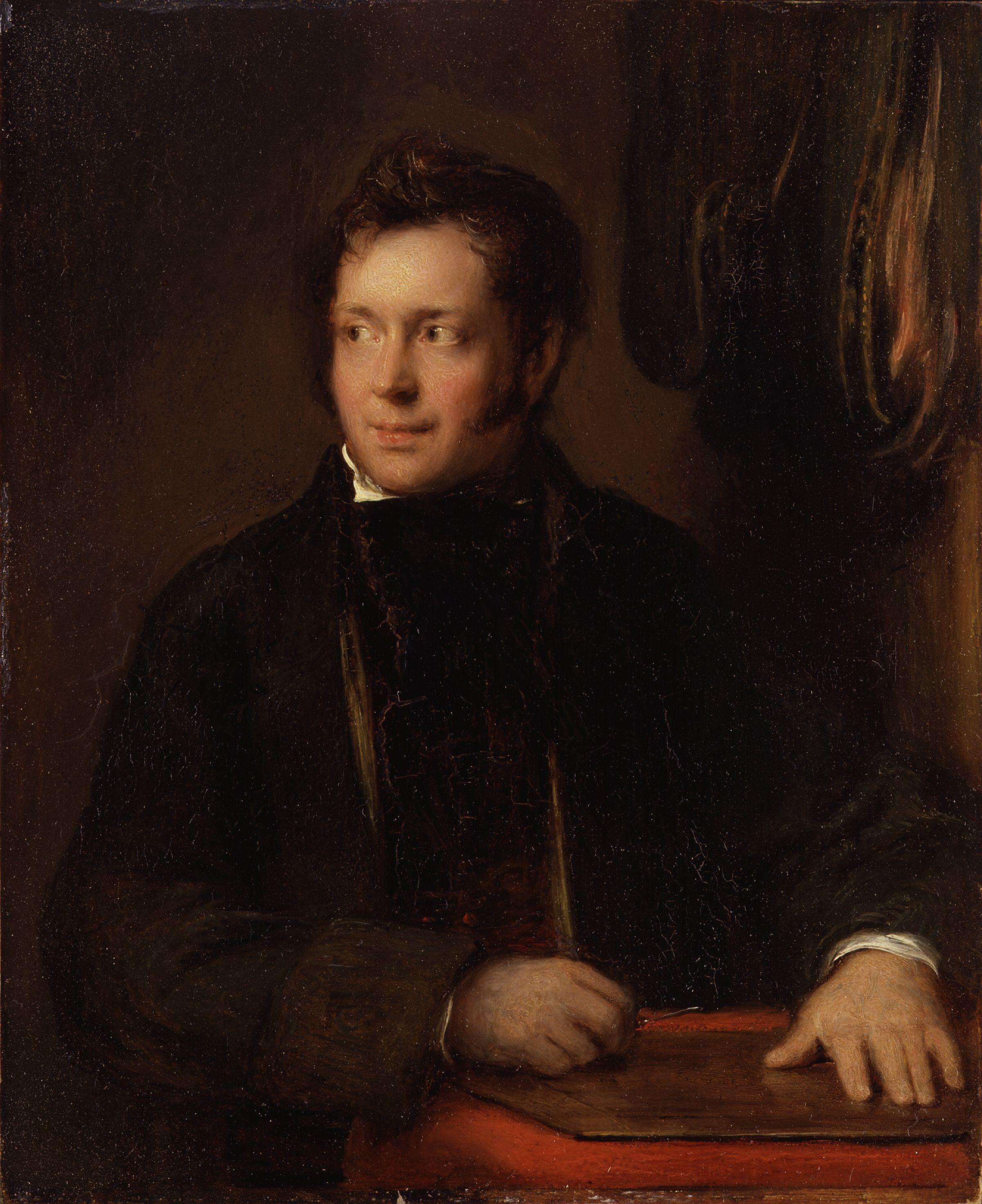
Abraham Raimbach, 1818

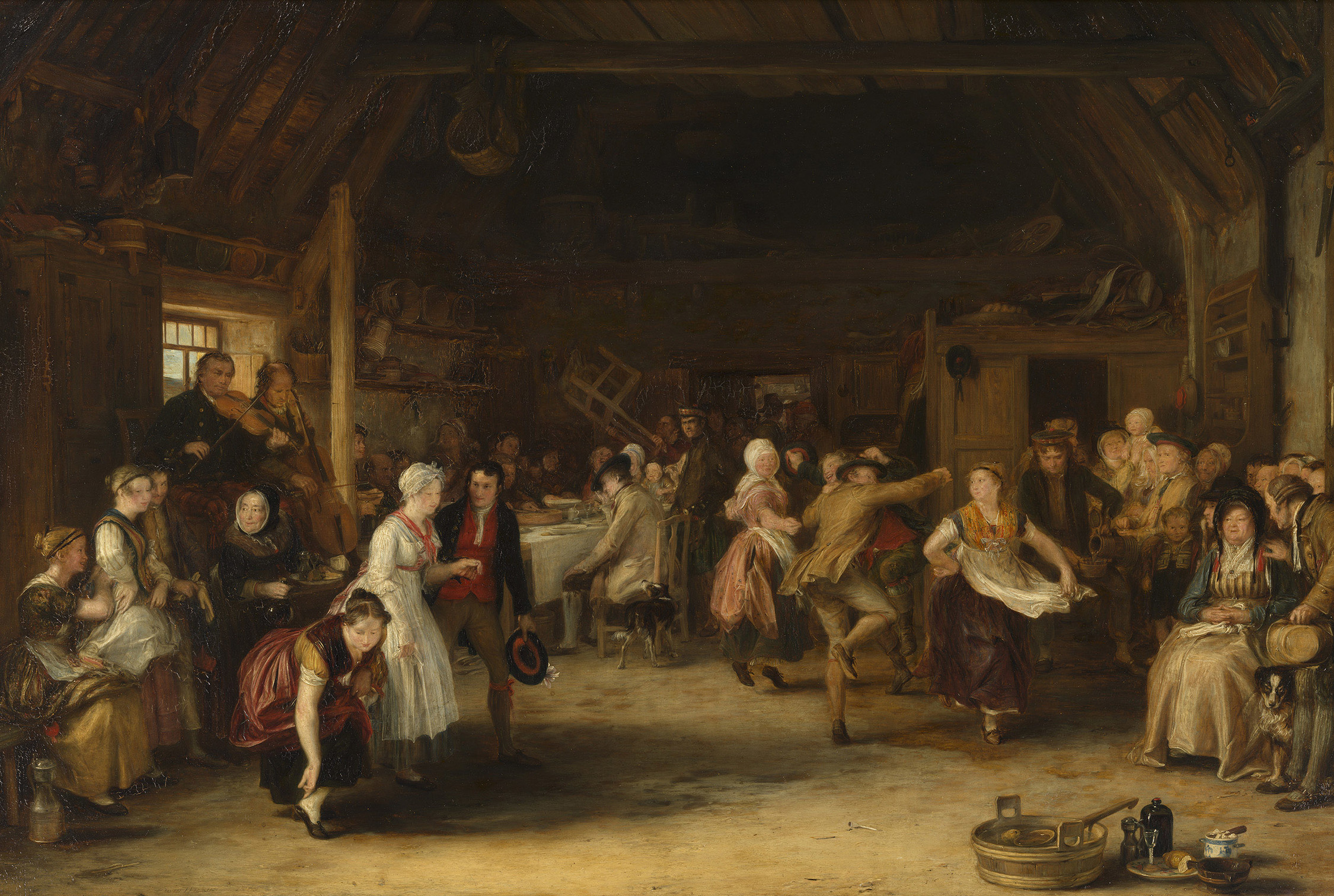
The Penny Wedding, 1818

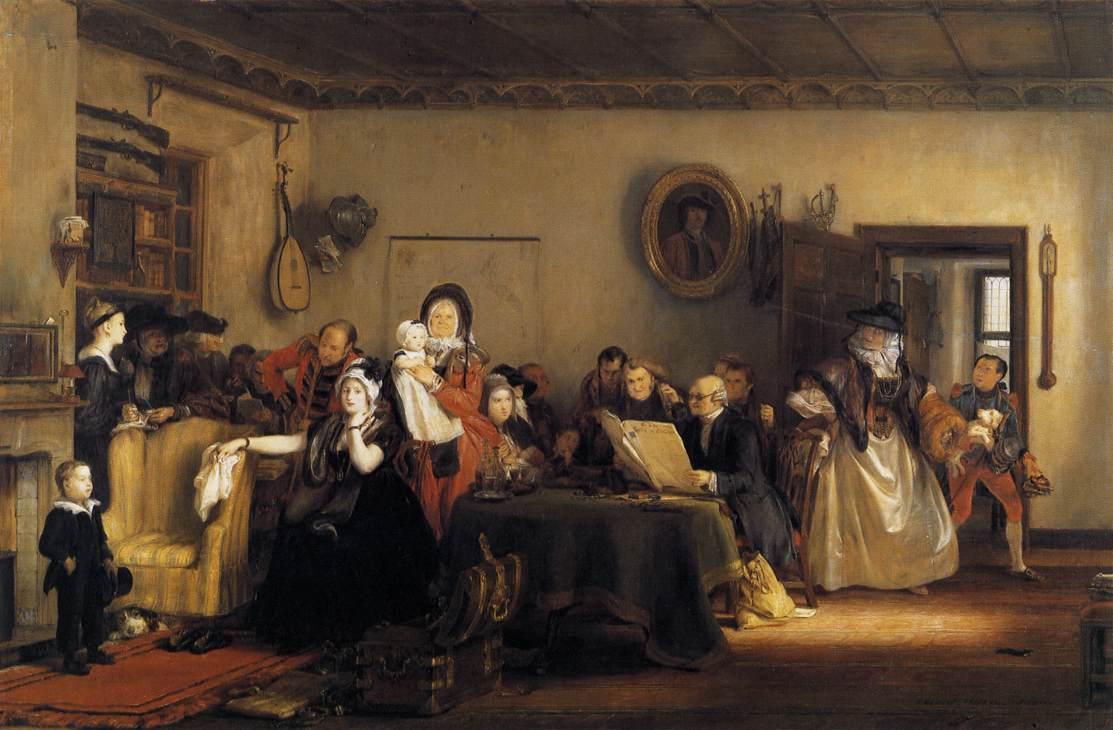
Reading the Will, 1820

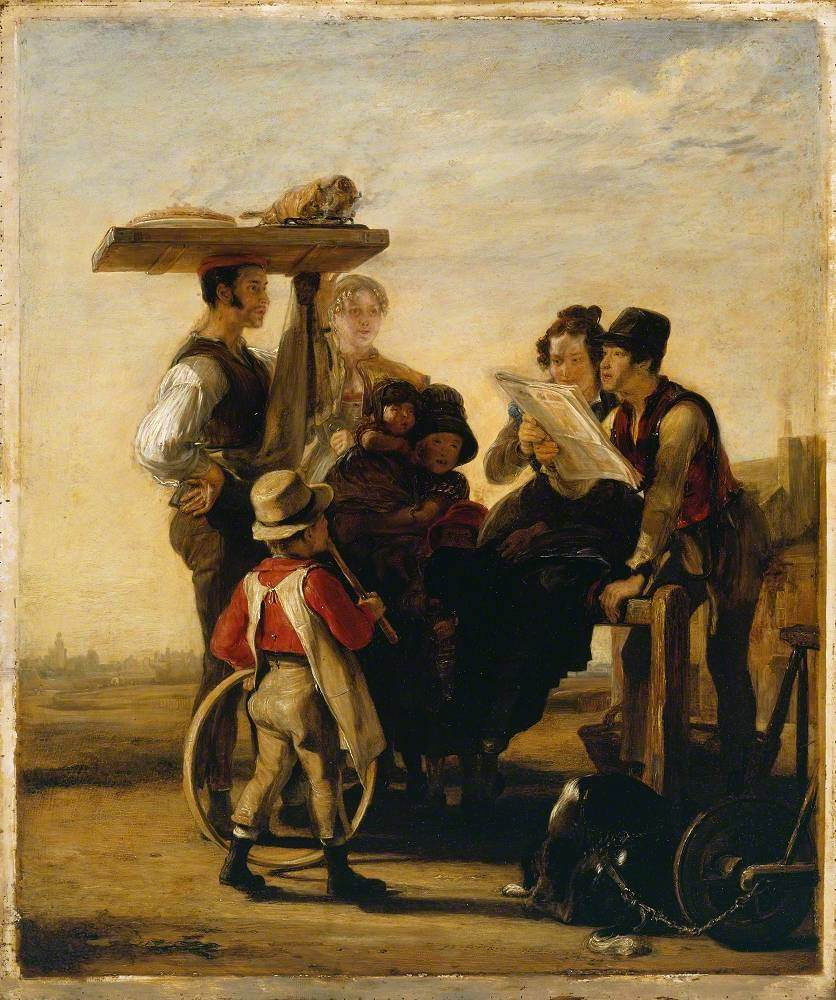
Newsmongers, 1821

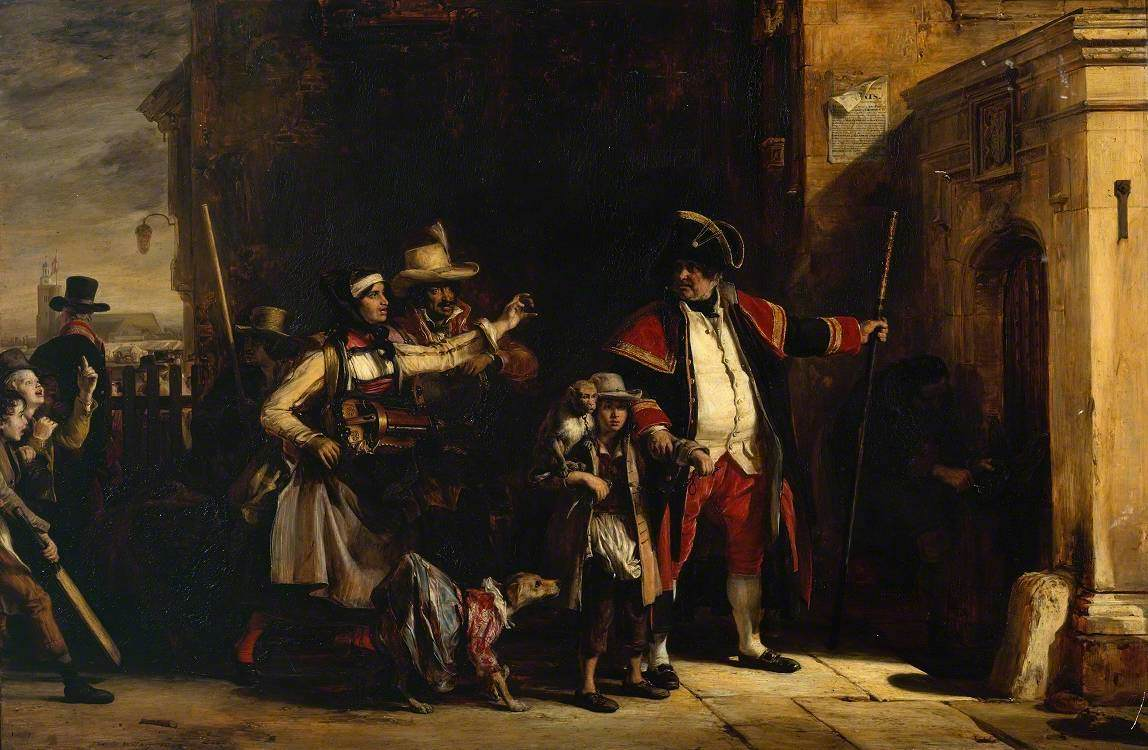
The Parish Beadle, 1823

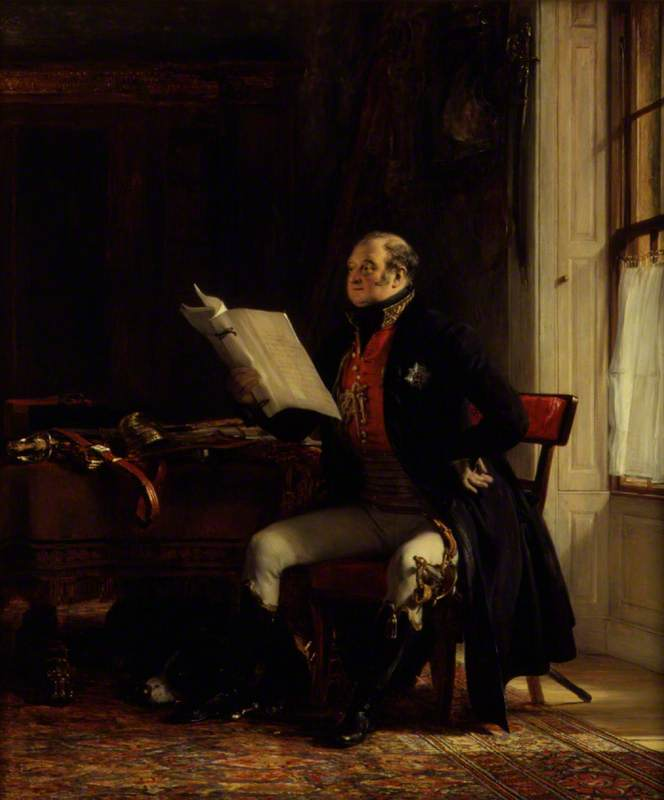
Portrait of the Duke of York, 1823

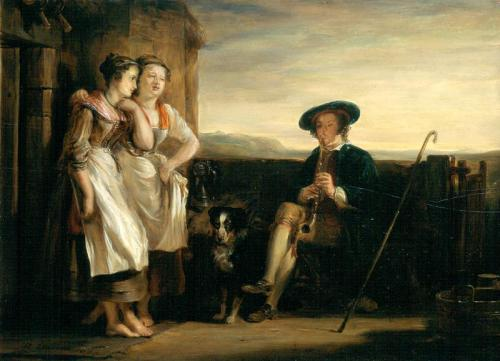
The Gentle Shepherd, 1823

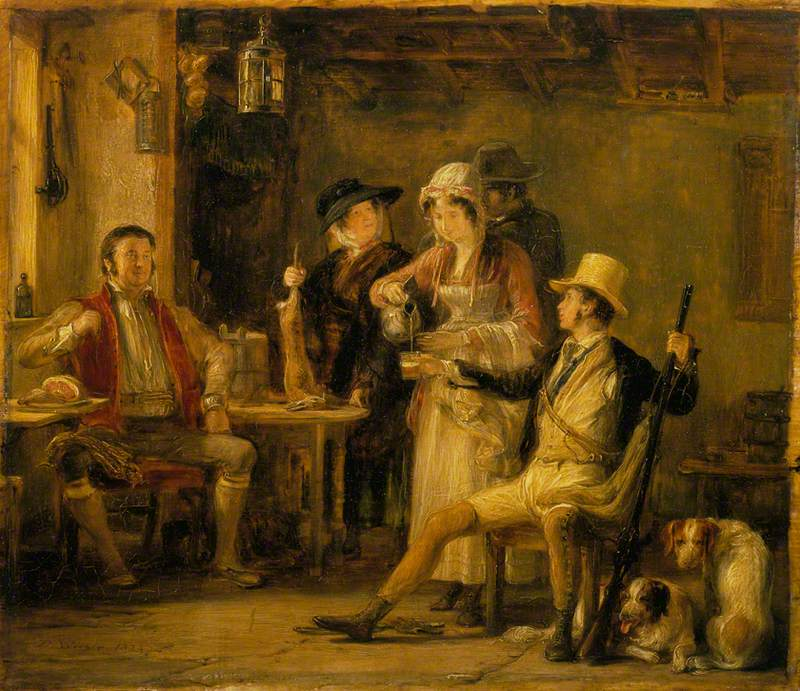
The Sportsman, 1824

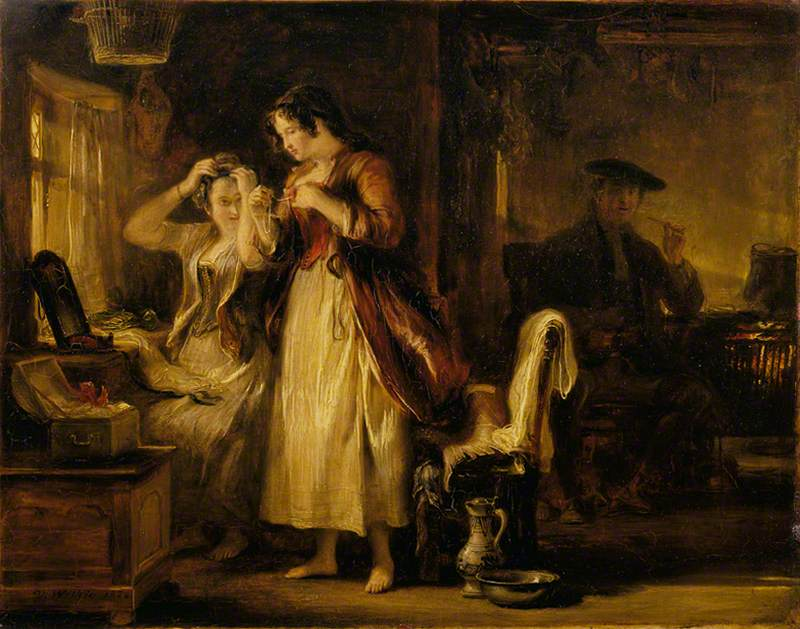
The Cottage Toilette, 1824

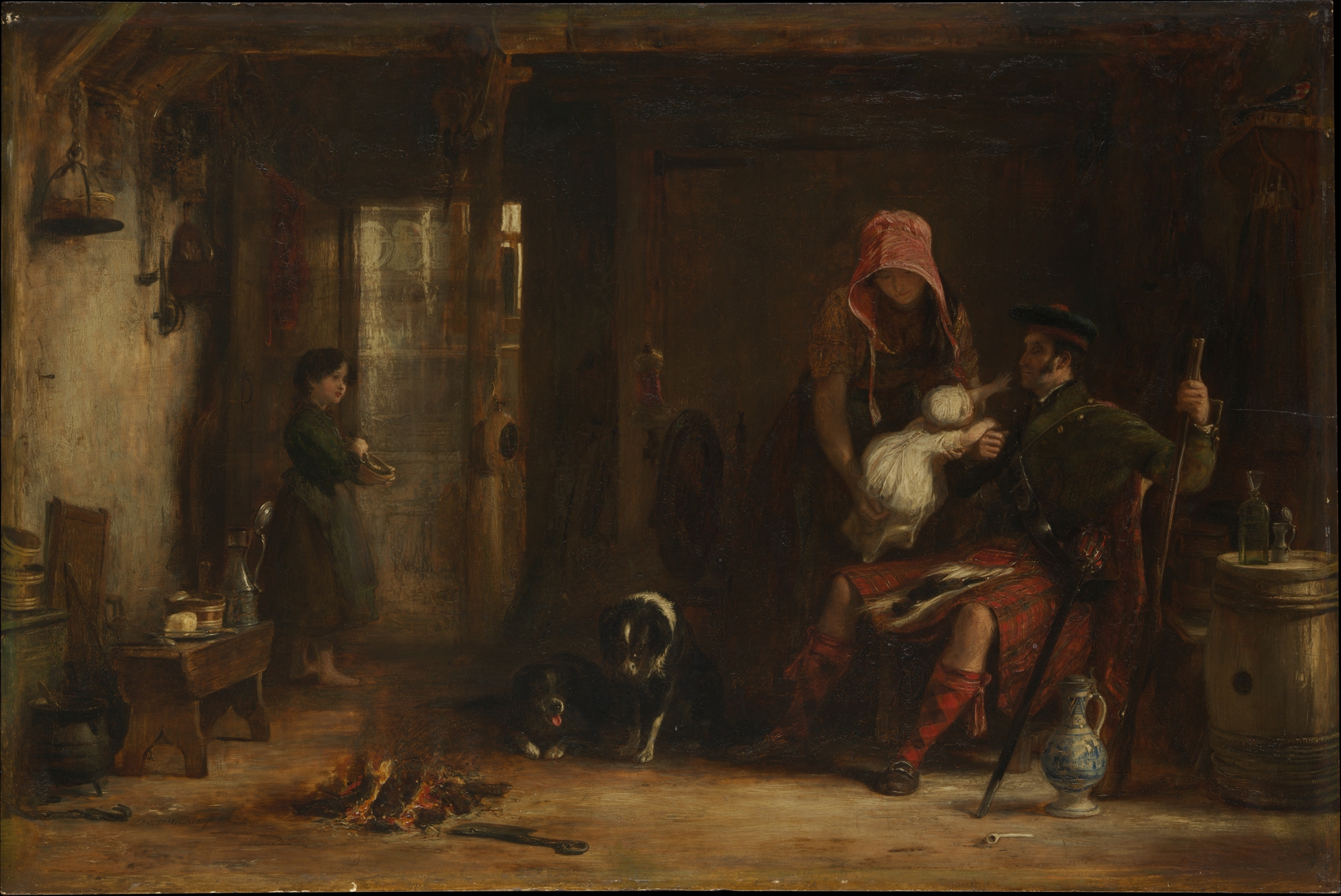
The Highland Family, 1824

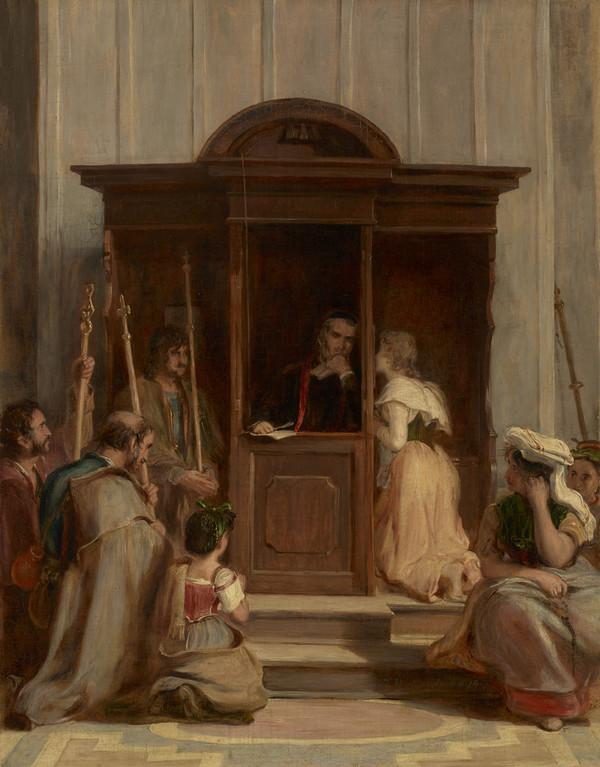
The Confessional, 1827

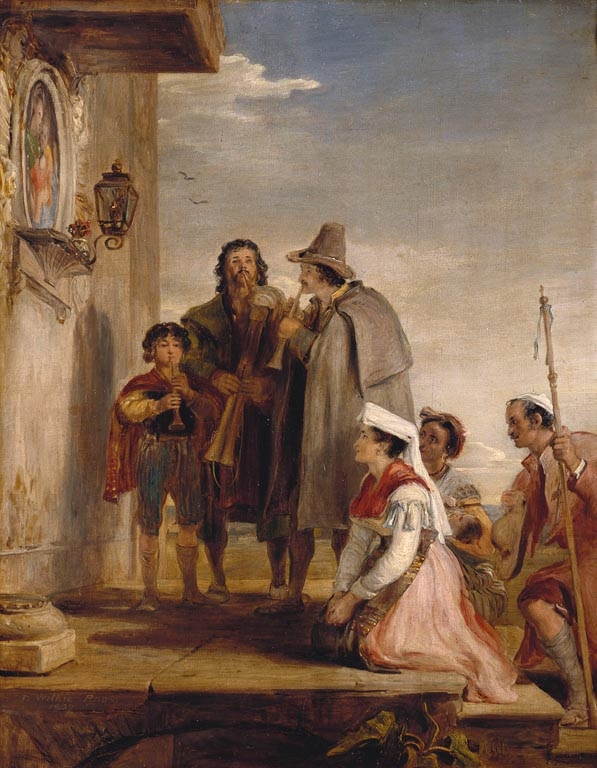
I Pifferari, 1827

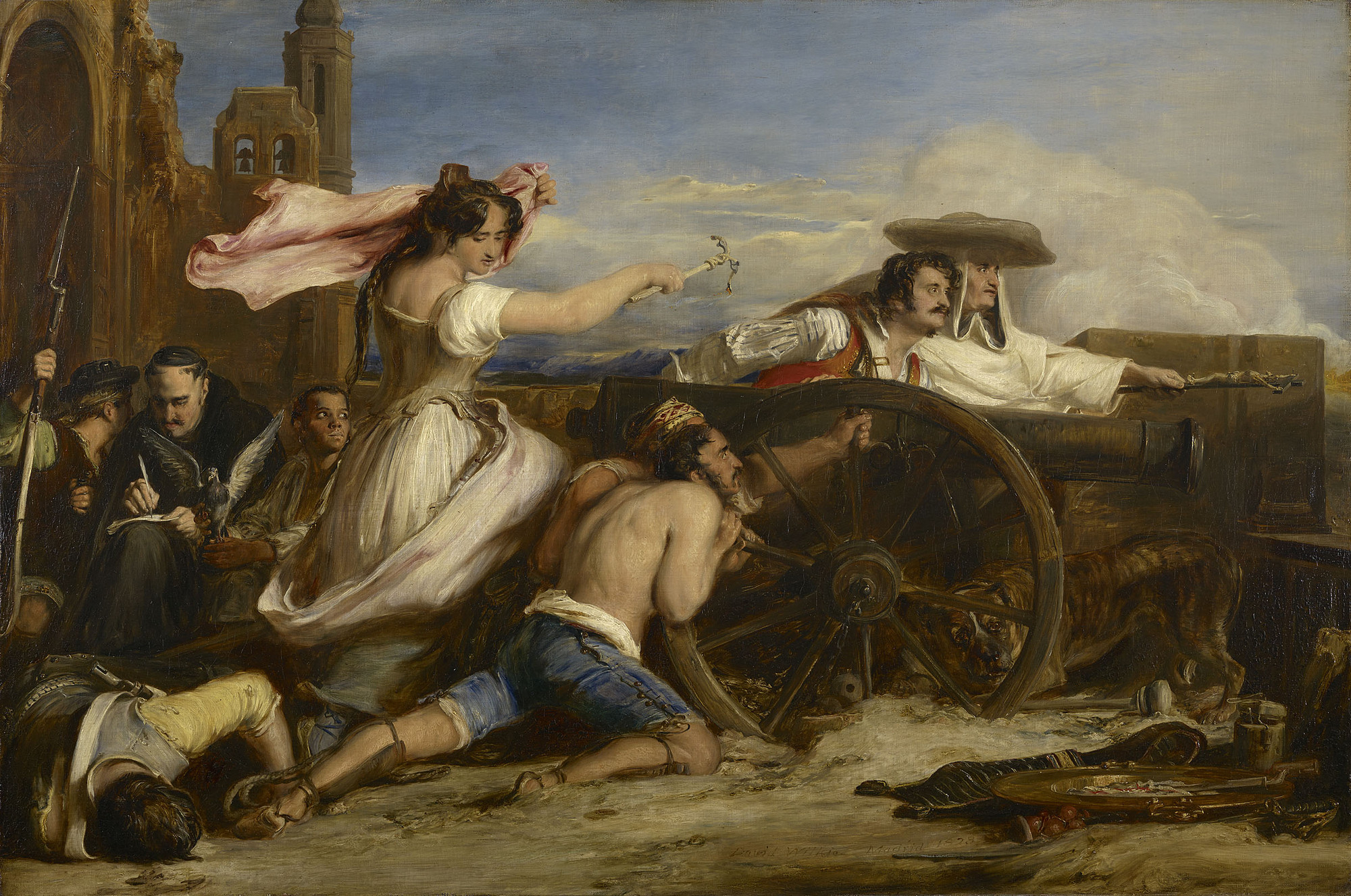
The Defence of Saragossa, 1828

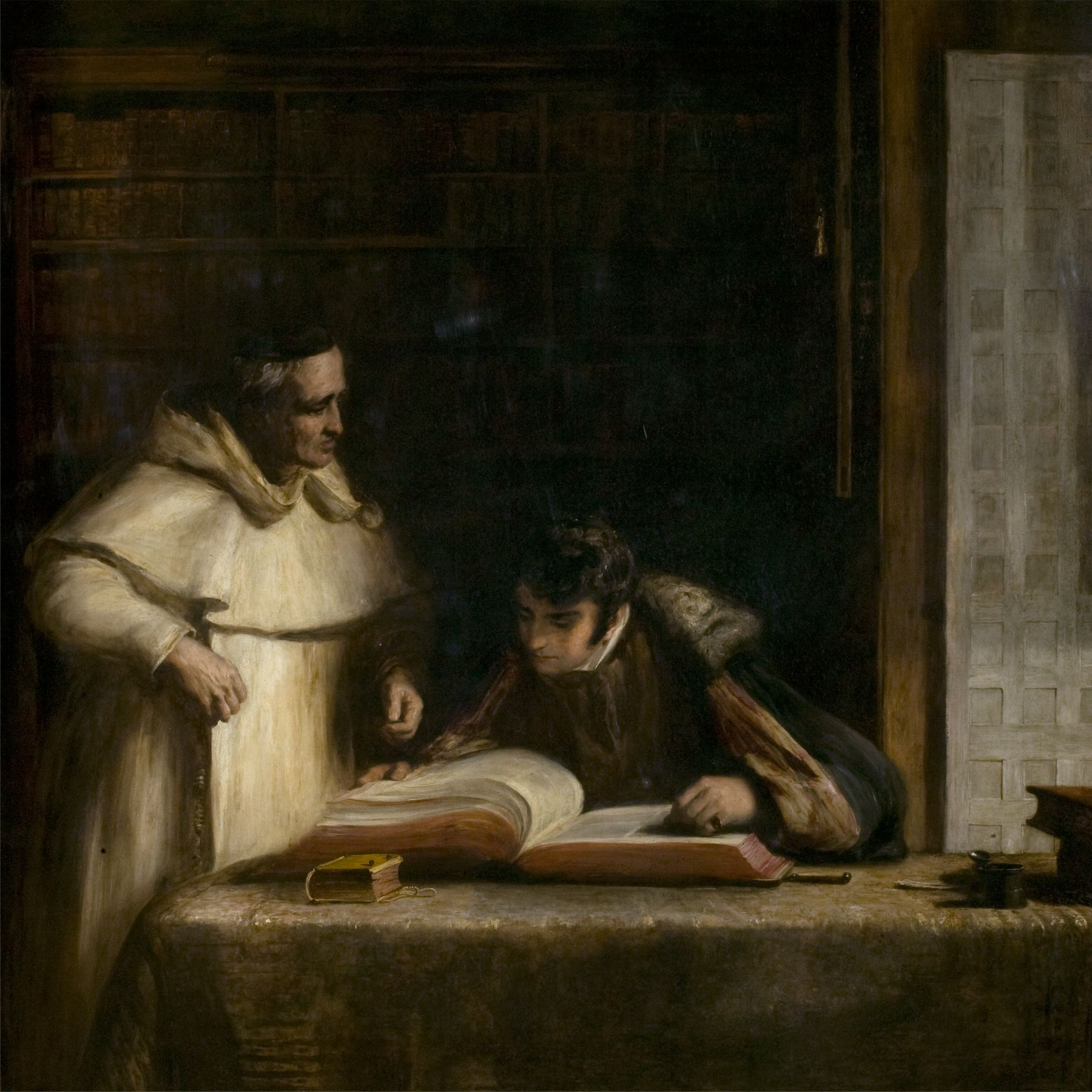
Washington Irving in the Archives of Seville, 1828

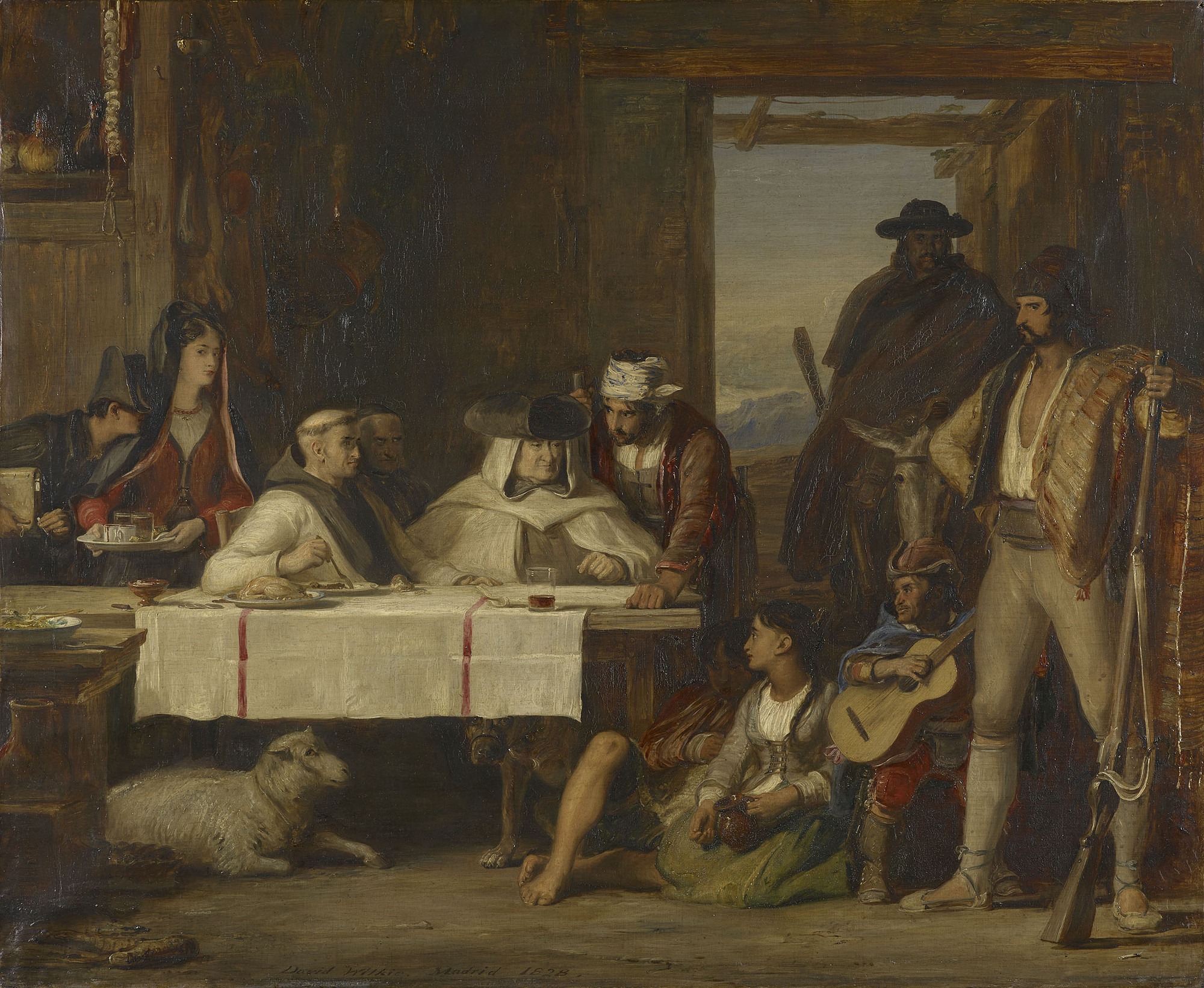
The Spanish Posada, 1828

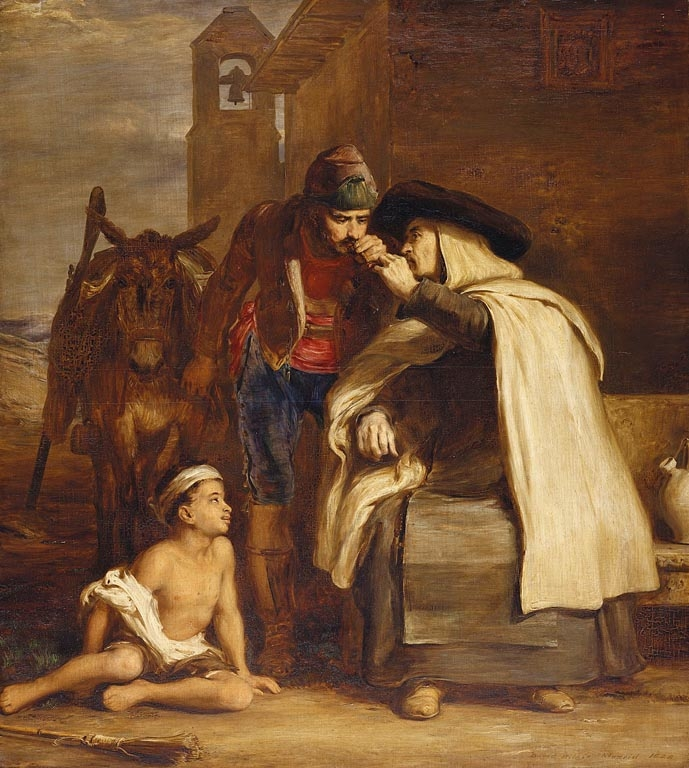
The Guerilla's Departure, 1828

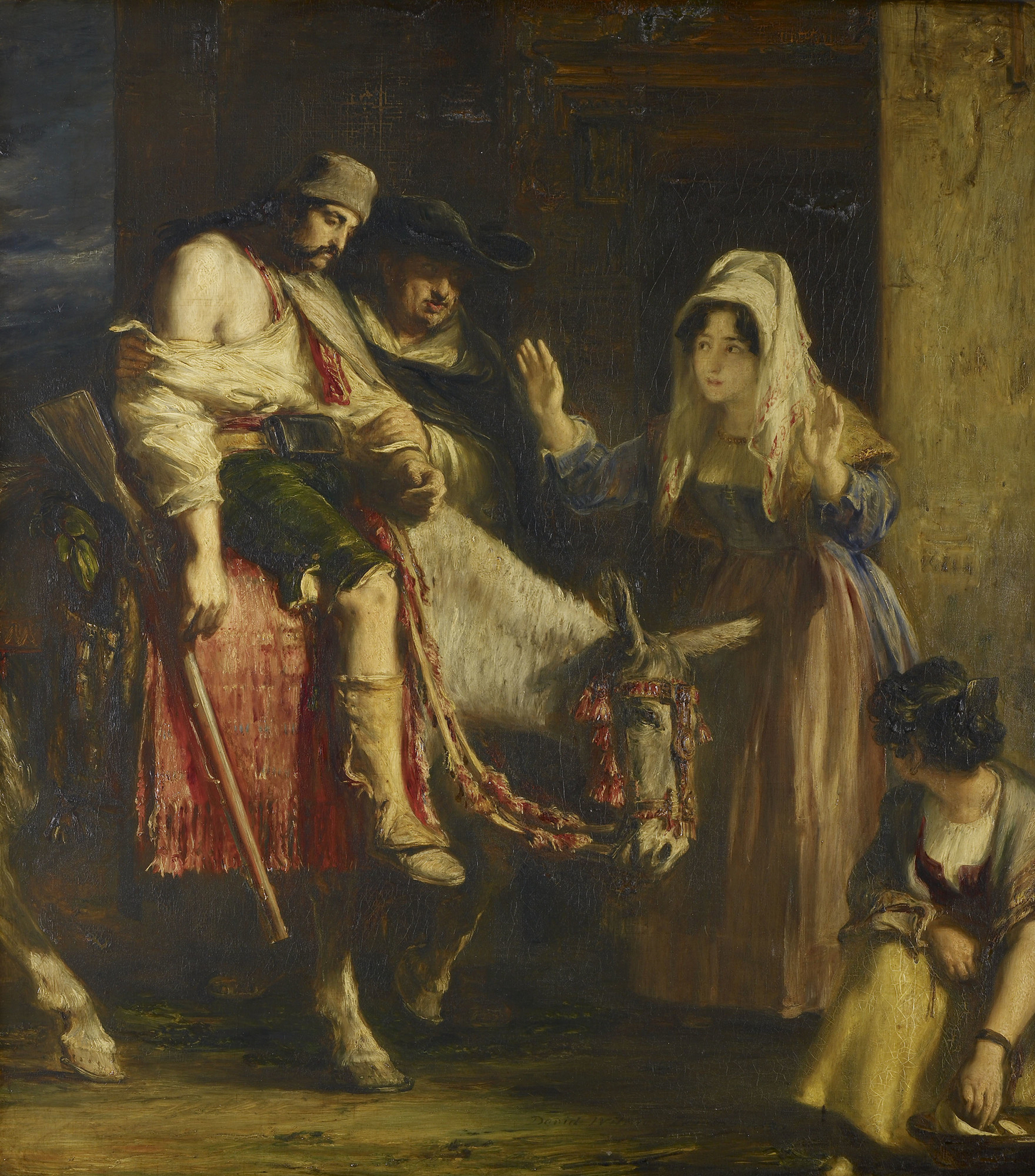
The Guerilla's Return, 1830

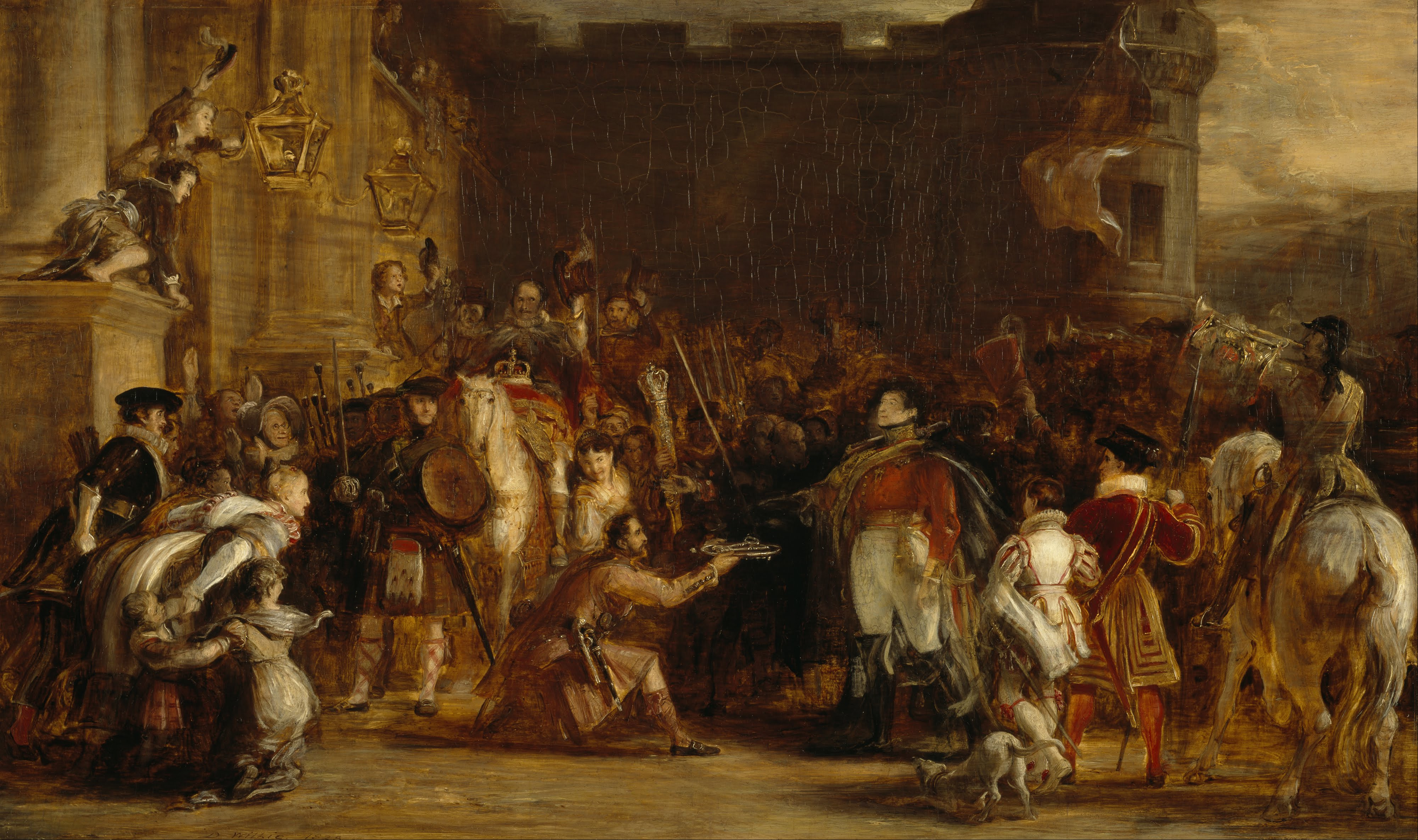
The Entrance of George IV at the Palace of Holyroodhouse, 1830

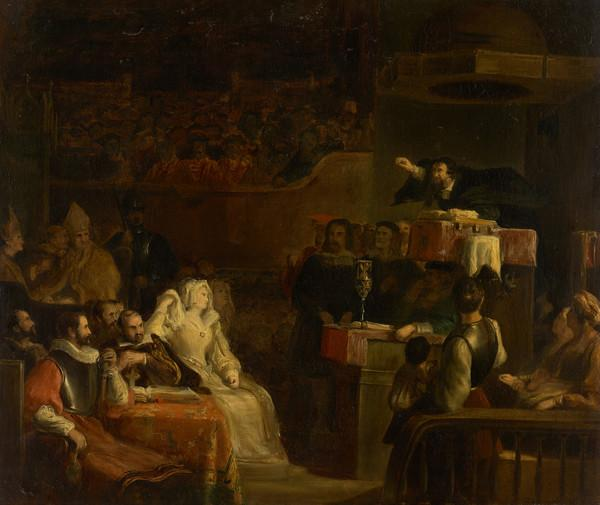
The Preaching of John Knox Before the Lords of the Congregation, 1832

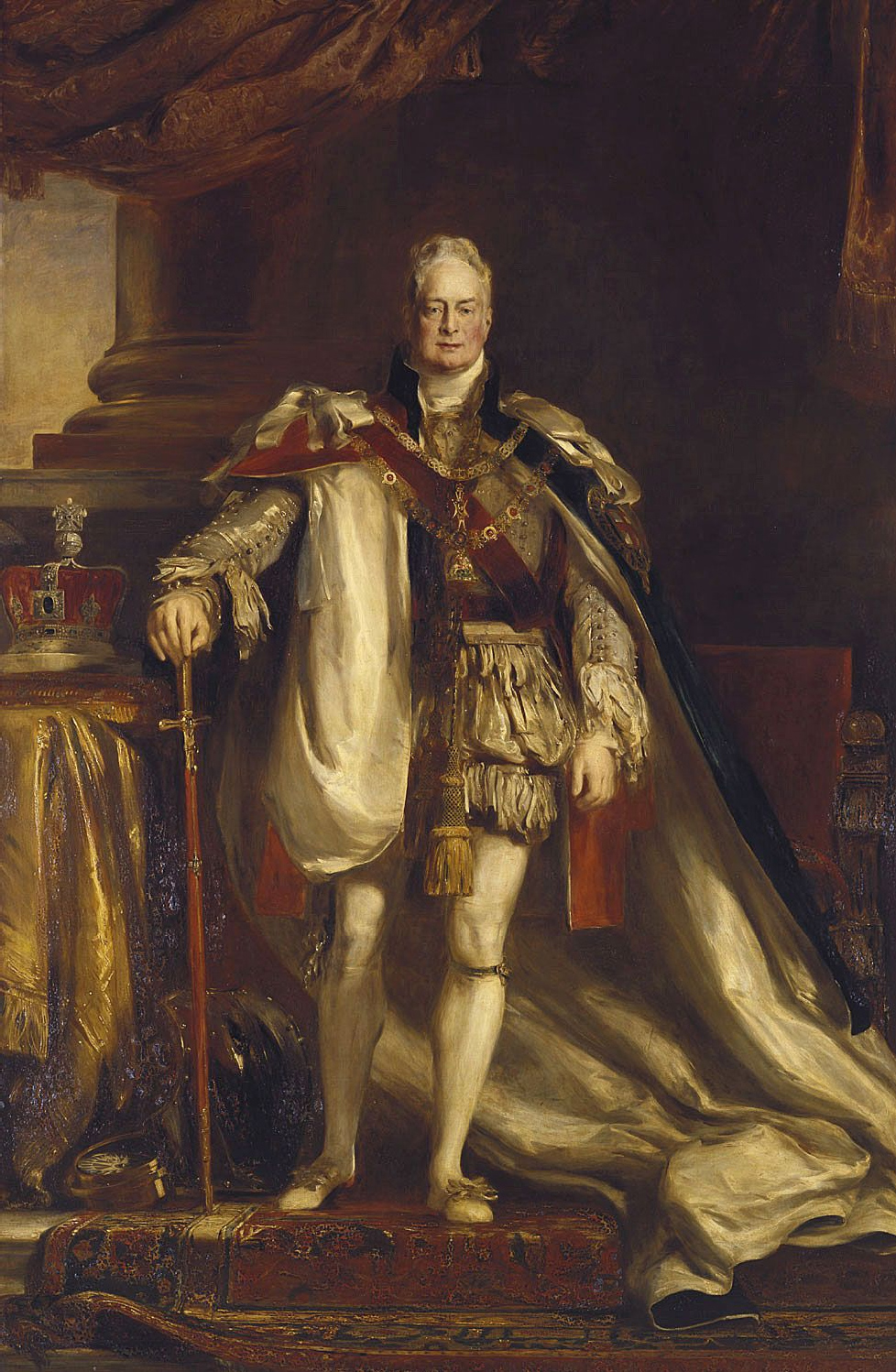
Portrait of William IV, 1832

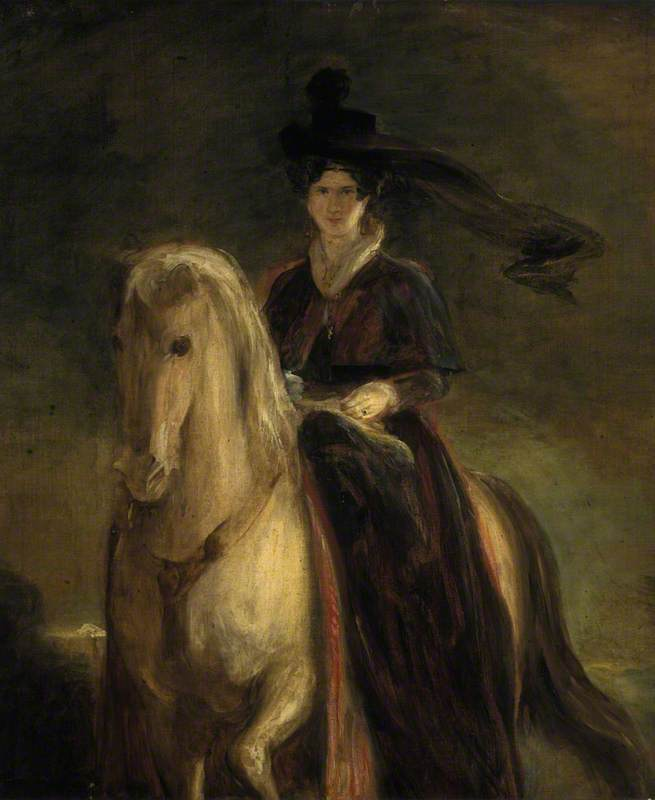
Queen Adelaide, 1833

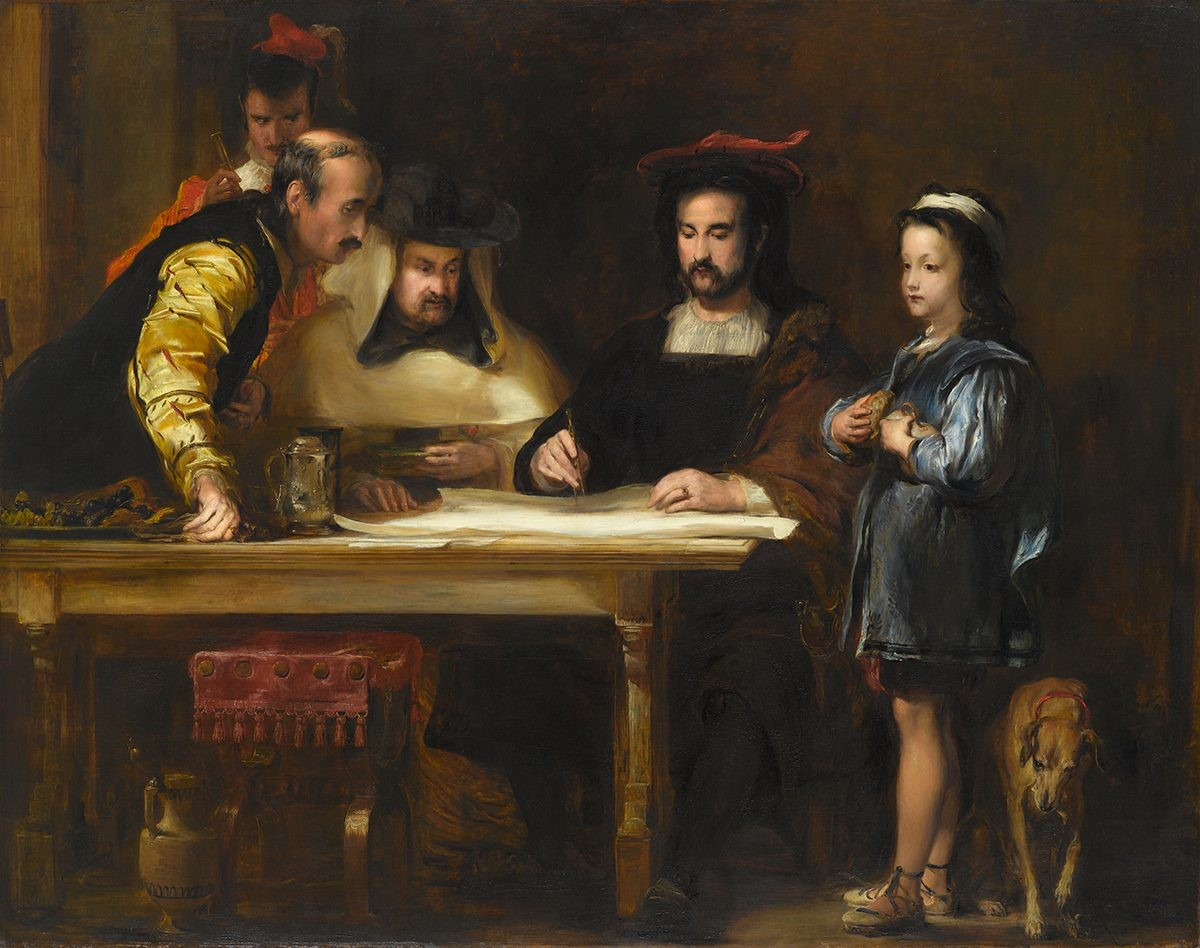
Christopher Columbus Explaining His Intended Voyage, 1834

Sancho Panza in the Days of his Youth, 1835

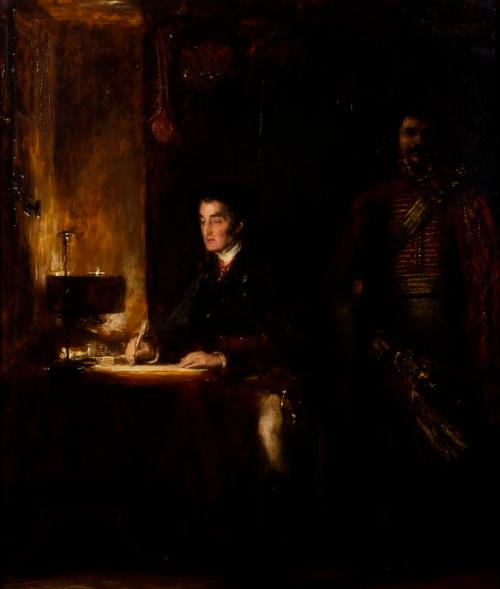
The Duke of Wellington Writing Dispatches, 1836

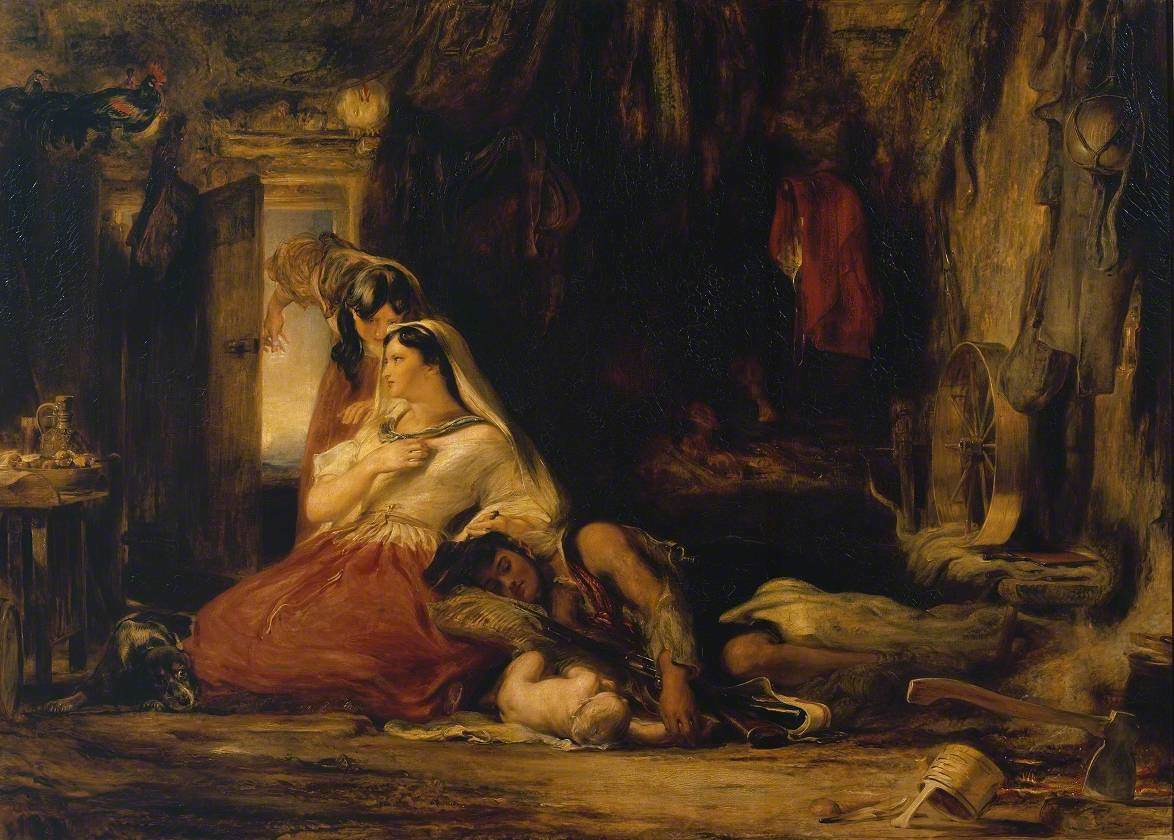
The Peep-o'-Day Boys' Cabin, 1836

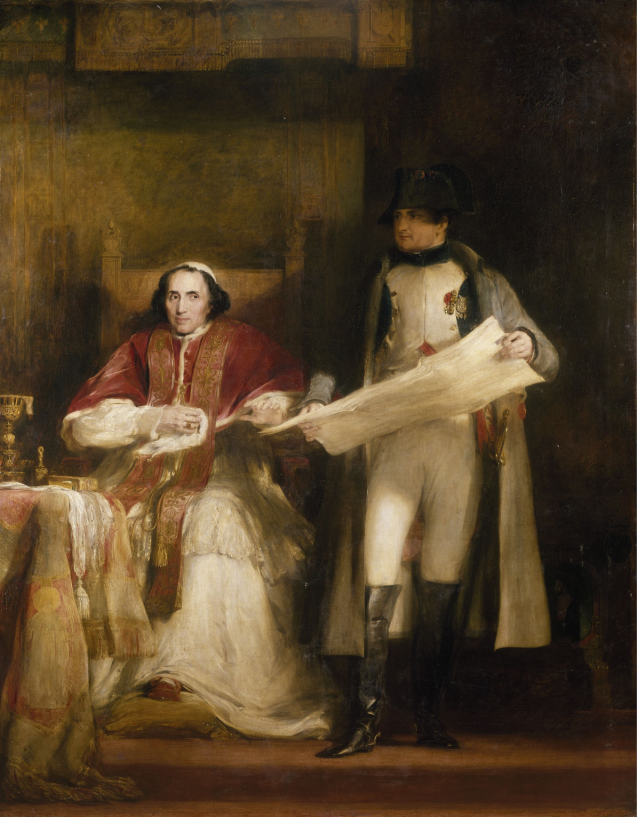
Napoleon and Pius VII at Fontainebleau, 1836

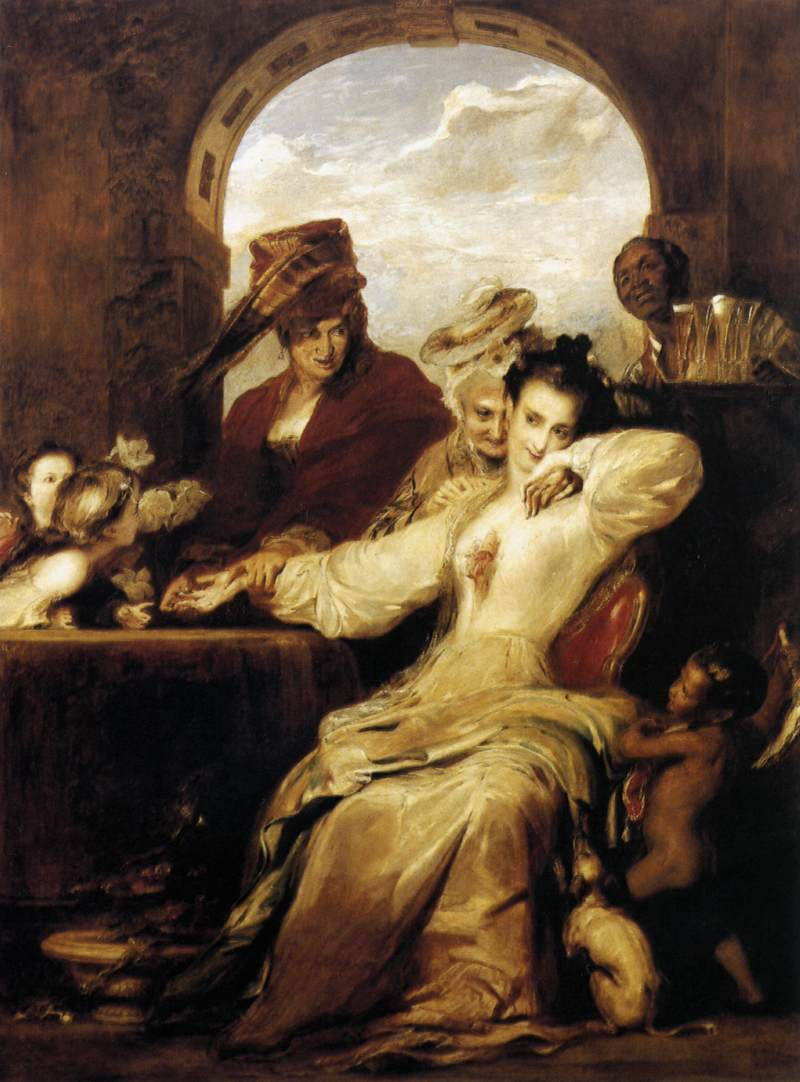
Josephine and the Fortune-Teller, 1837

The Cottar's Saturday Night, 1837

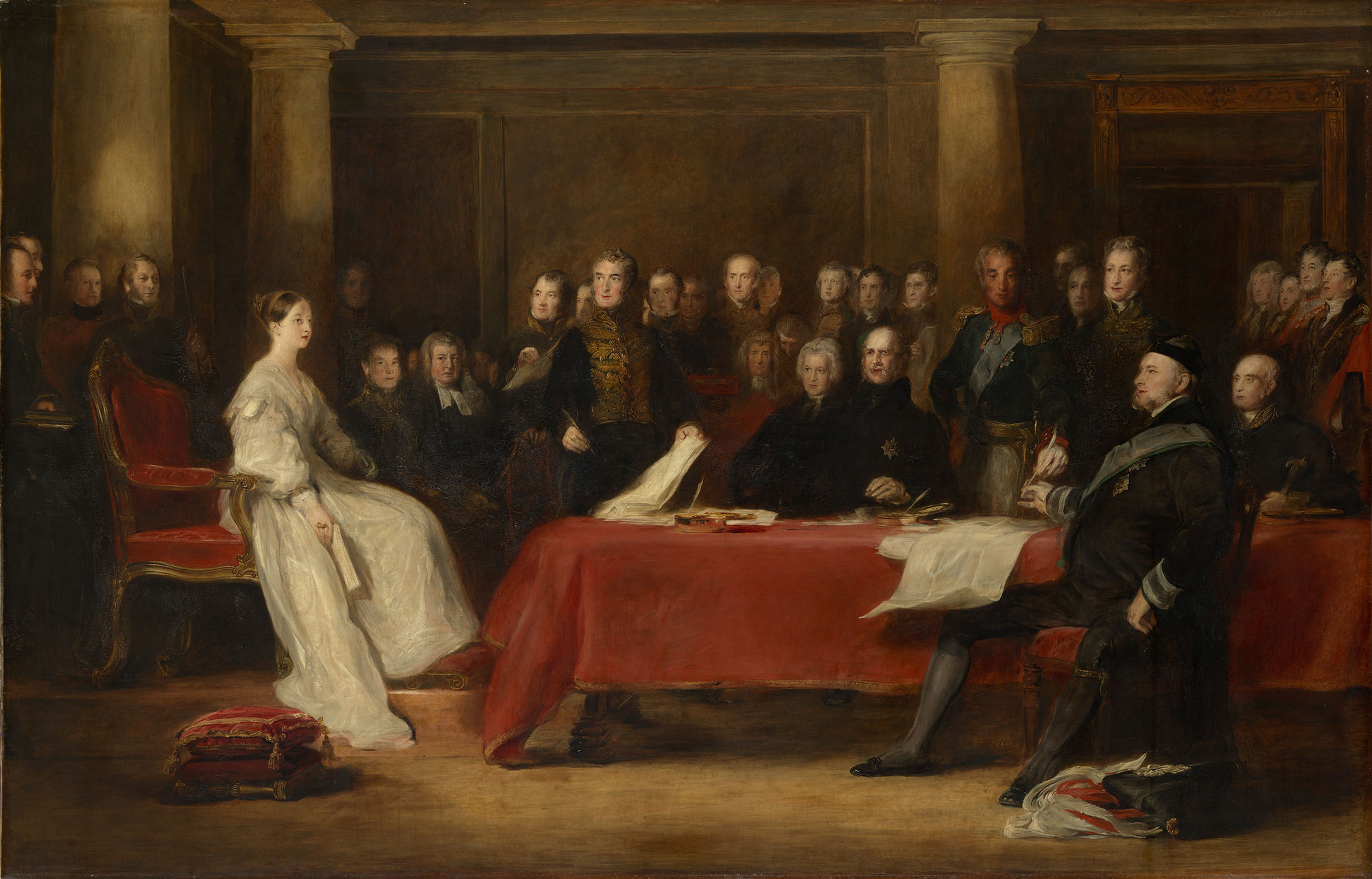
The First Council of Queen Victoria, 1838

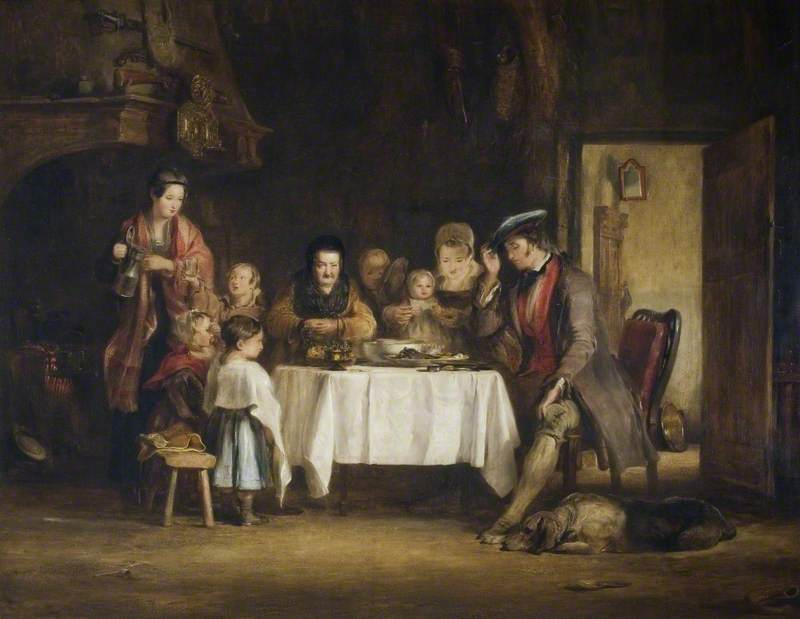
Grace Before Meat, 1839

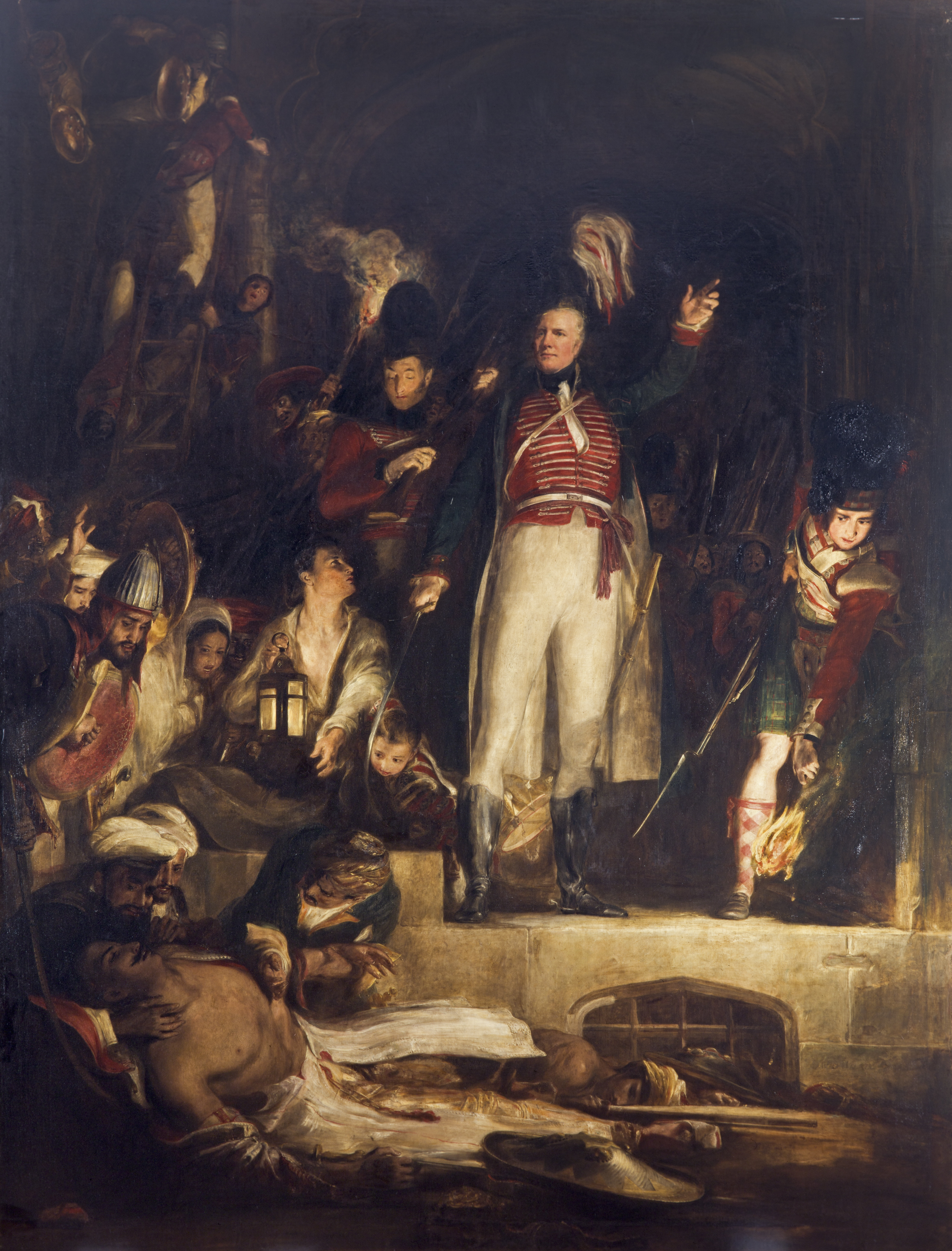
Sir David Baird Discovering the Body of Sultan Tipoo Sahib, 1839

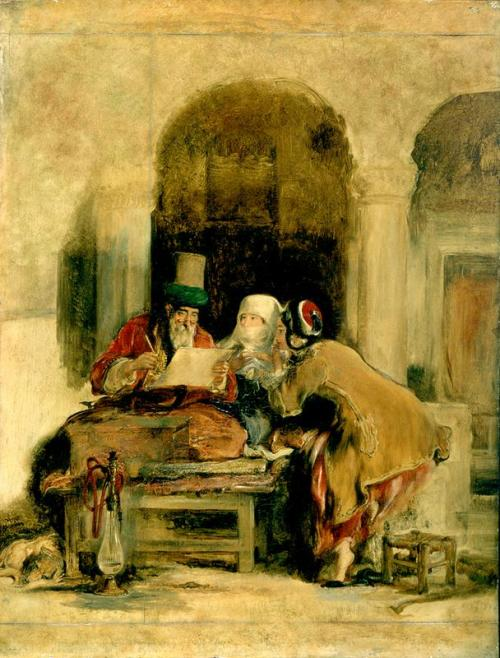
Thr Turkish Letter Writer, 1840

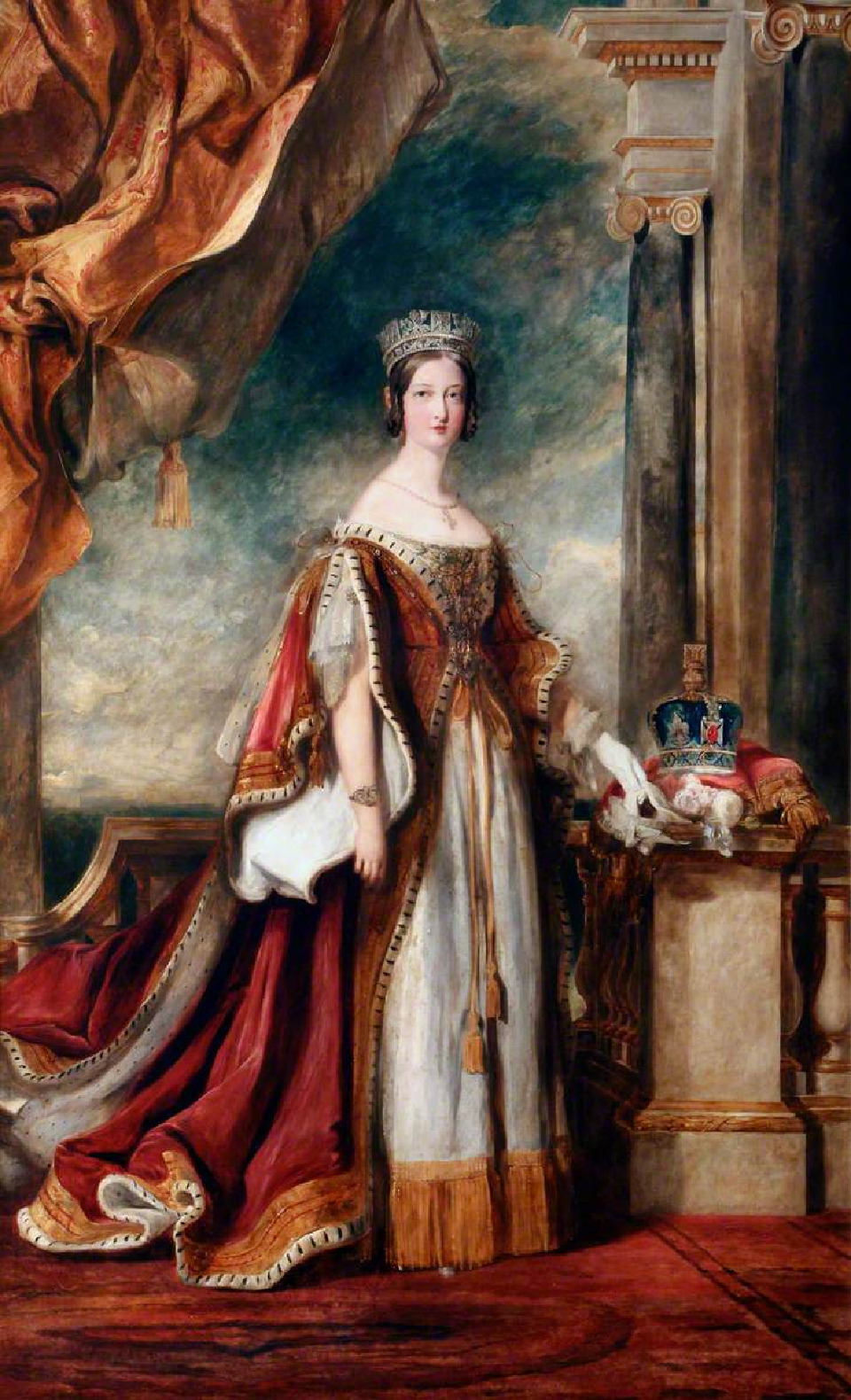
Portrait of Queen Victoria, 1840

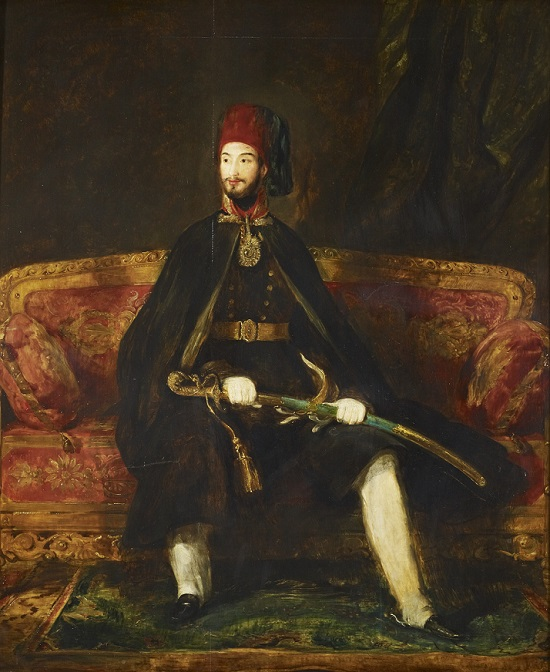
Portrait of Abdülmecid I, 1840

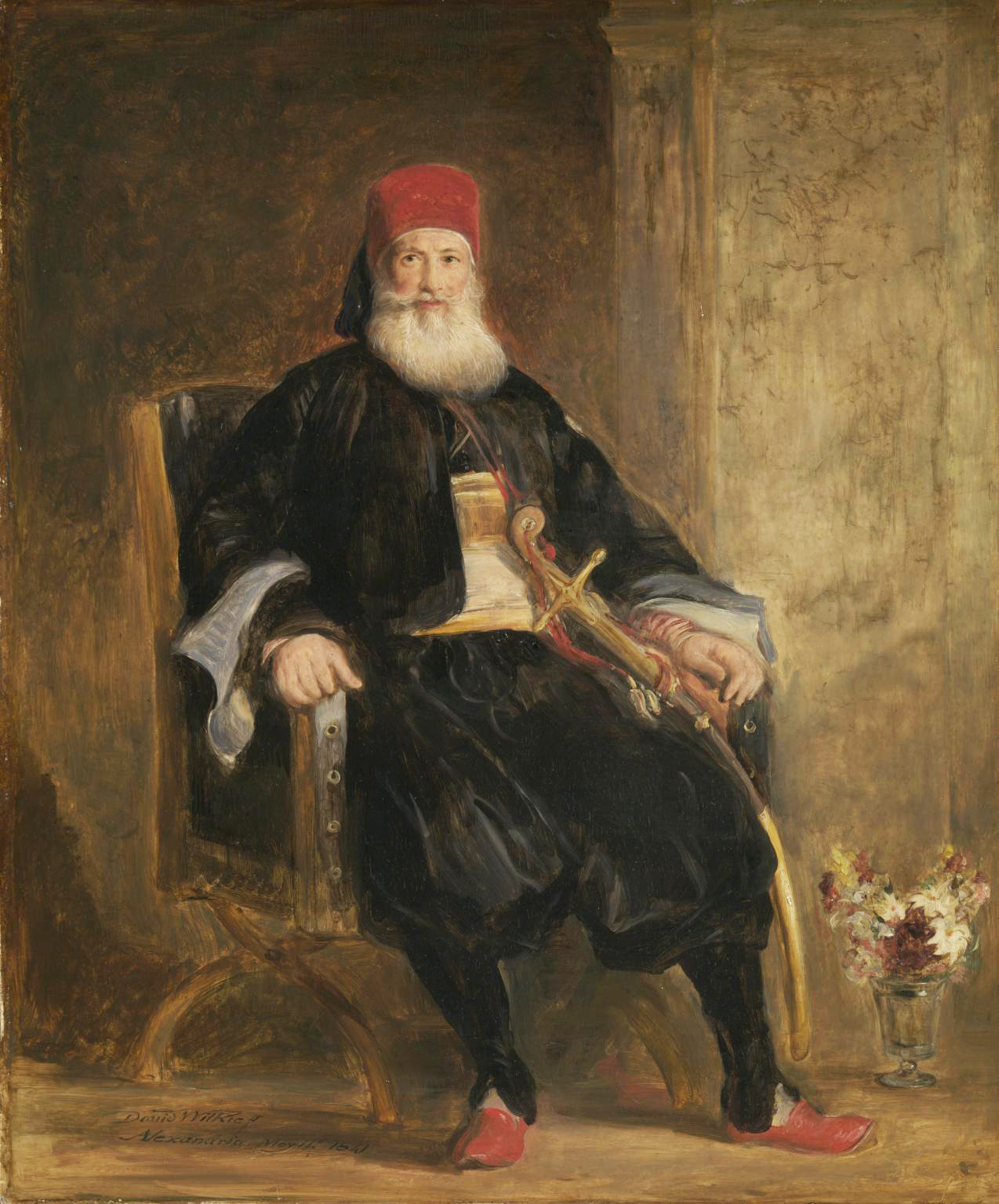
Portrait of Muhammad Ali of Egypt, 1841

== See also ==
- List of Orientalist artists
- Orientalism

== Notes ==
Court offices
Preceded by Sir Thomas Lawrence	Principal Painter in Ordinary; 1830–1841	Succeeded by Sir George Hayter
