= The Sportsman (painting) =

Painting by David Wilkie

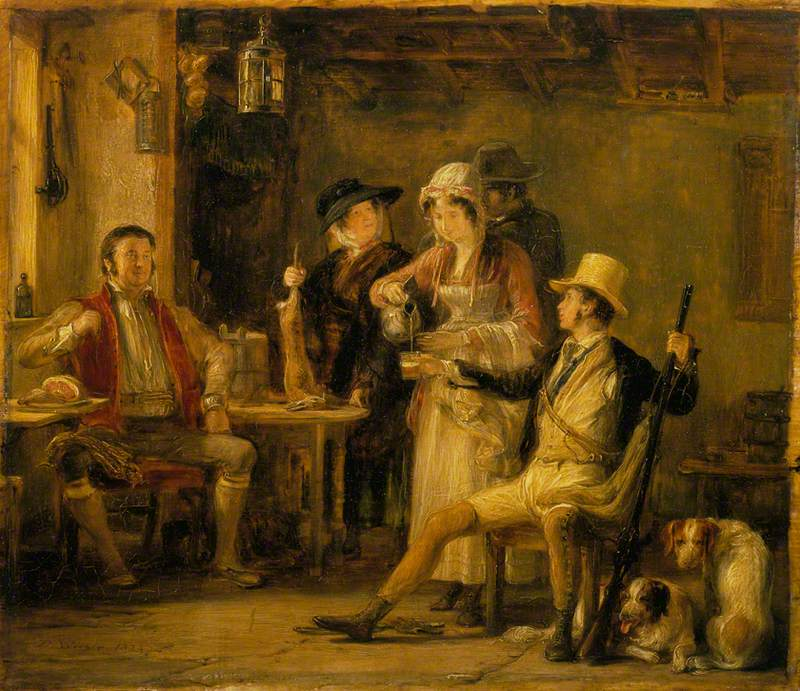
- Artist: David Wilkie
- Year: 1824
- Type: Oil on mahogany, genre painting
- Dimensions: 26.8 cm × 31 cm (10.6 in × 12 in)
- Location: Wallace Collection; London

The Sportsman is an 1824 genre painting by the British artist David Wilkie. After a day's shooting a young sportsman stops for refreshment in a rural cottage. It features members of the family of the politician and art collector Earl of Mulgrave, who had been a patron of Wilkie's for many years. The stance of the sportsman resembles that of the Highlander in Wilkie's The Highland Family, produced around the same time.

The painting was commissioned by General Edmund Phipps, the younger brother of Mulgrave. Like much of Wilkie's genre work, it stylistically resembles Dutch seventeenth century paintings. Today the painting is in the Wallace Collection, having been acquired in 1859 by the Marquess of Hertford.

== Bibliography ==
- Baetjer, Katharine. British Paintings in the Metropolitan Museum of Art, 1575-1875. Metropolitan Museum of Art, 2009.
- Tromans, Nicholas. David Wilkie: The People's Painter. Edinburgh University Press, 2007.
- Wright, Christopher, Gordon, Catherine May & Smith, Mary Peskett. British and Irish Paintings in Public Collections: An Index of British and Irish Oil Paintings by Artists Born Before 1870 in Public and Institutional Collections in the United Kingdom and Ireland. Yale University Press, 2006.
