= Boys Digging for Rats =

Painting by David Wilkie

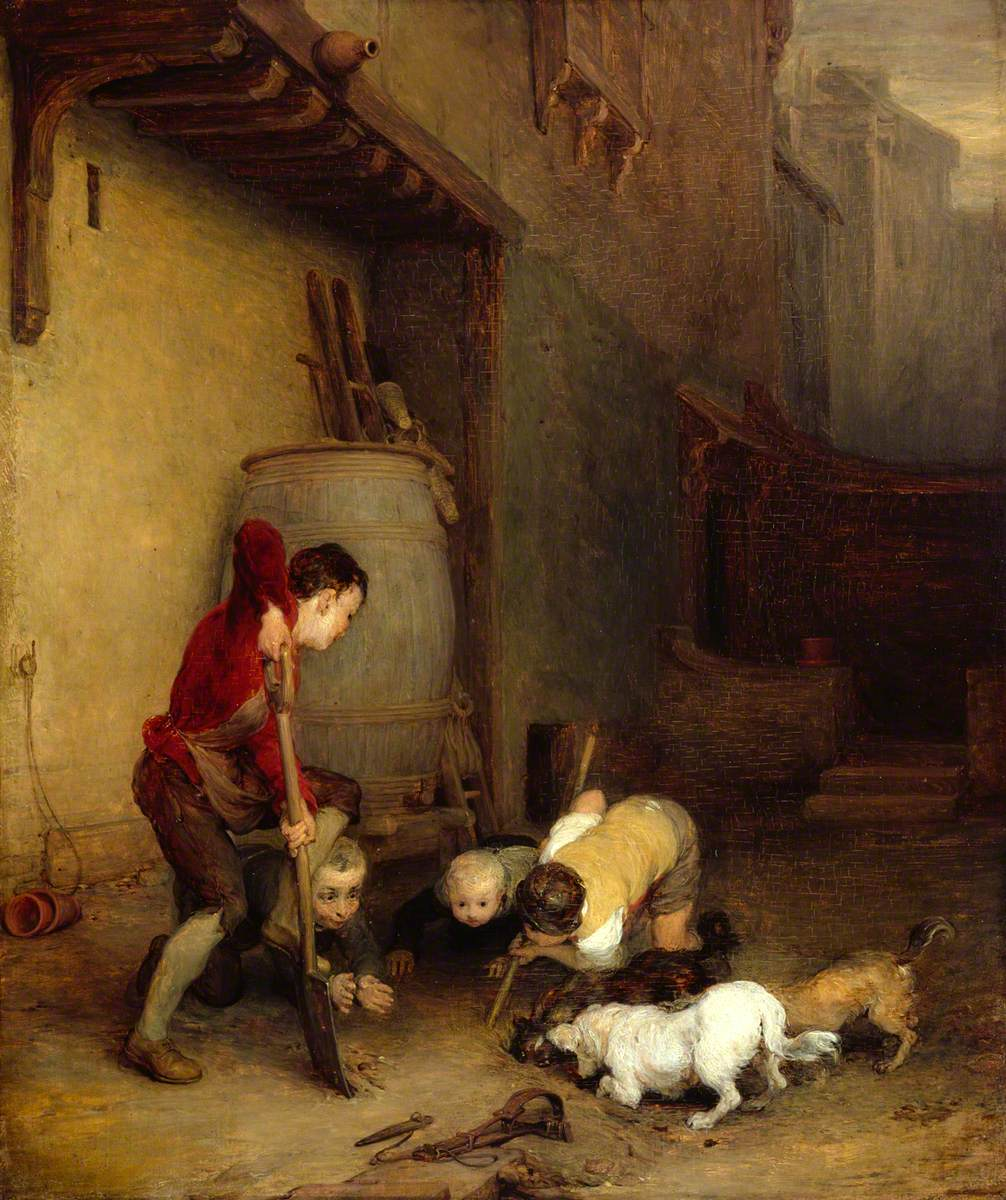
- Artist: David Wilkie
- Year: 1812
- Type: Oil on panel, genre painting
- Dimensions: 36.4 cm × 30.4 cm (14.3 in × 12.0 in)
- Location: Royal Academy of Arts; London

Boys Digging for Rats is an 1812 oil painting by the British artist David Wilkie. It depicts a group of boys and dogs excitedly digging in the ground hoping to find a rat. It is also known by the title Rat-Catchers.

The Scottish Wilkie enjoyed huge success after moving to London. He was known for his genre scenes of ordinary life, his style strongly influenced by the works of the Dutch Golden Age of the seventeenth century. In 1811 Wilkie was elected to full membership of the Royal Academy of Arts. As part of the process he was required to submit a diploma work. It remains in the collection of the Royal Academy today.

== Bibliography ==
- Herrmann, Luke. Nineteenth Century British Painting. Charles de la Mare, 2000.
- Macmillan, Duncan. Painting in Scotland: The Golden Age. Phaidon Press, 1986.
- Tromans, Nicholas. David Wilkie: The People's Painter. Edinburgh University Press, 2007.
