= Scottish art in the nineteenth century =

Scottish visual art

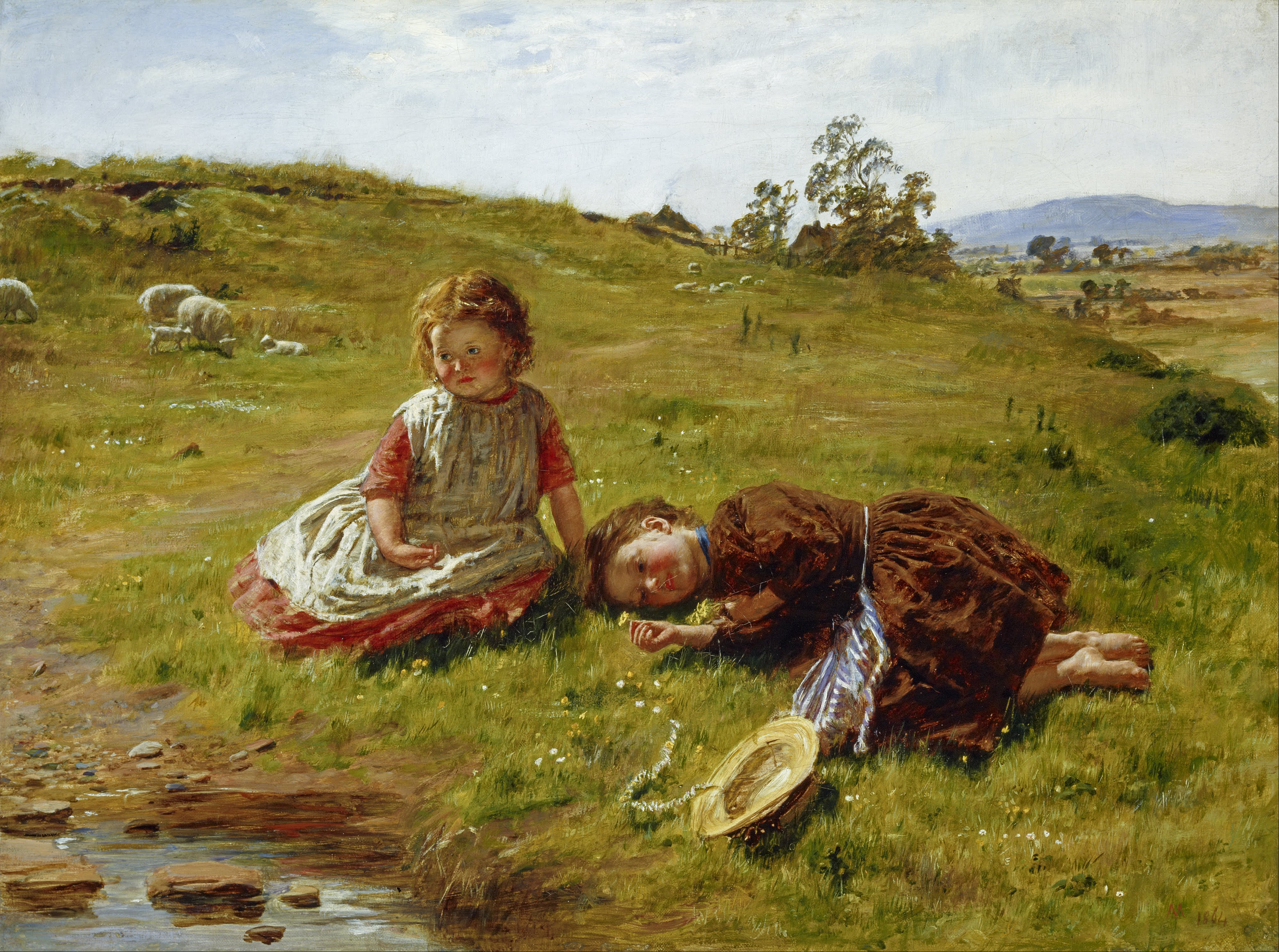
William McTaggart Spring (1864)

Scottish art in the nineteenth century is the body of visual art made in Scotland, by Scots, or about Scottish subjects. This period saw the increasing professionalisation and organisation of art in Scotland. Major institutions founded in this period included the Institution for the Encouragement of the Fine Arts in Scotland, the Royal Scottish Academy of Art, the National Gallery of Scotland, the Scottish National Portrait Gallery and the Glasgow Institute. Art education in Edinburgh focused on the Trustees Drawing Academy of Edinburgh. Glasgow School of Art was founded in 1845 and Grays School of Art in Aberdeen in 1885.

Henry Raeburn, most famous for his intimate portraits of leading figures in Scottish life, was the first significant artist to pursue his entire career in Scotland. His pupils included the brothers William, Archibald and Andrew Robertson. The next generation of portrait painters included David Watson and John Watson Gordon. Significant Glasgow artists included John Graham-Gilbert and Daniel Macnee. David Wilkie emerged as of one of the most influential British artists of the century in a variety of forms. Alexander Nasmyth helped formulate the tradition of Scottish landscape painting, which focused in the mid-nineteenth century on the Highlands. It was taken into the late nineteenth century by artists including Horatio McCulloch, Joseph Farquharson and William McTaggart. Towards the end of the century a number of artist colonies were founded, particularly in coastal communities such as Pittenweem and Kirkcudbright. Wilkie was instrumental in the development of genre painting, which was pursued by artists including John Burnet, Alexander George Fraser and Walter Geikie. He also helped inspire the interest in Spanish and oriental painting, continued by William Allan, David Roberts and John Phillip.

Sculpture was pioneered in Scotland by Lawrence Macdonald and George Combe. John Steell was the first significant Scottish sculptor to pursue their career in Scotland, gaining attention for his Alexander and Bucephalus and his design for a statue of Sir Walter Scott incorporated into the author's memorial in Edinburgh. The tradition of Scottish sculpture was boosted by the statues made for the Wallace Monument and by the centenary of Robert Burns' death in 1896. Photography was pioneered in Scotland by Robert Adamson and David Octavius Hill. As Hill & Adamson they formed the first photographic studio in Scotland in 1843 and produced work that is among the first and finest artistic uses of photography. It was subsequently pursued by Thomas Annan, George Washington Wilson and Clementina Hawarden.

The beginnings of the Arts and Crafts movement in Scotland were in the stained glass revival of the 1850s, pioneered in Edinburgh by James Ballantine and in Glasgow by Daniel Cottier. The Glasgow-born designer and theorist Christopher Dresser was one of the first, and most important, independent designers, a pivotal figure in the Aesthetic Movement and a major contributor to the allied Anglo-Japanese movement. A Celtic Revival, drawing on ancient myths and history to produce art in a modern idiom, was pursued by artists including Anna Traquair, John Duncan, Stewart Carmichael and George Dutch Davidson. In the late nineteenth century developments in Scottish art are associated with the Glasgow School. This was made up of loose groups including the Glasgow Boys, of James Guthrie, Joseph Crawhall, George Henry and E. A. Walton, who were influenced by French Impressionism and Realism. From around 1890 "The Four" or the "Spook School", was composed of acclaimed architect Charles Rennie Mackintosh, Margaret MacDonald, Frances and Herbert MacNair. They produced a distinctive blend of influences that helped define the Art Nouveau style.

== Institutions and education ==
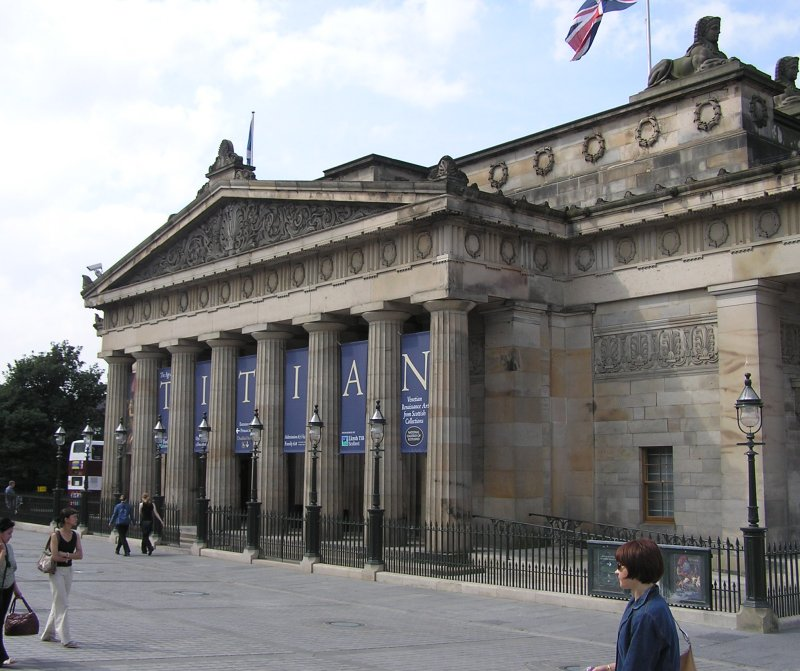
The Royal Scottish Academy, Edinburgh

The Institution for the Encouragement of the Fine Arts in Scotland was founded in 1819 in Edinburgh, to provide an opportunity for artists to present their work. It came to be dominated by a small aristocratic elite and excluded artists from its committee. This led to the founding of the Royal Scottish Academy of Art in 1826. The resulting competition between the two bodies eventually resulted in a de facto merger. In 1835 the now Royal Institution's building on Princes Street, Edinburgh became the Academy's home for exhibitions. The Academy was granted a Royal Charter in 1837 and its members were instrumental in the foundation of the National Gallery of Scotland in Edinburgh, which opened in 1859. The Scottish National Portrait Gallery was founded in 1882. The Glasgow Institute was formed in 1861 to provide exhibiting opportunities in the growing city similar to those in Edinburgh. It opened its own gallery on Sauchiehall Street in 1879. It received a Royal charter in 1896 and became the Royal Glasgow Institute of the Fine Arts.

Scotland has had schools of art since the eighteenth century. The Trustees Drawing Academy of Edinburgh had been founded in Edinburgh in 1760. It became the Trustees' School of Art, and placed under auspices of the Science and Art Department in South Kensington in 1858. It was taken over by the Scottish Education Department in 1907. Glasgow School of Art grew from the city's School of Design, founded in 1845. Grays School of Art in Aberdeen was founded in 1885.

== Portraiture ==
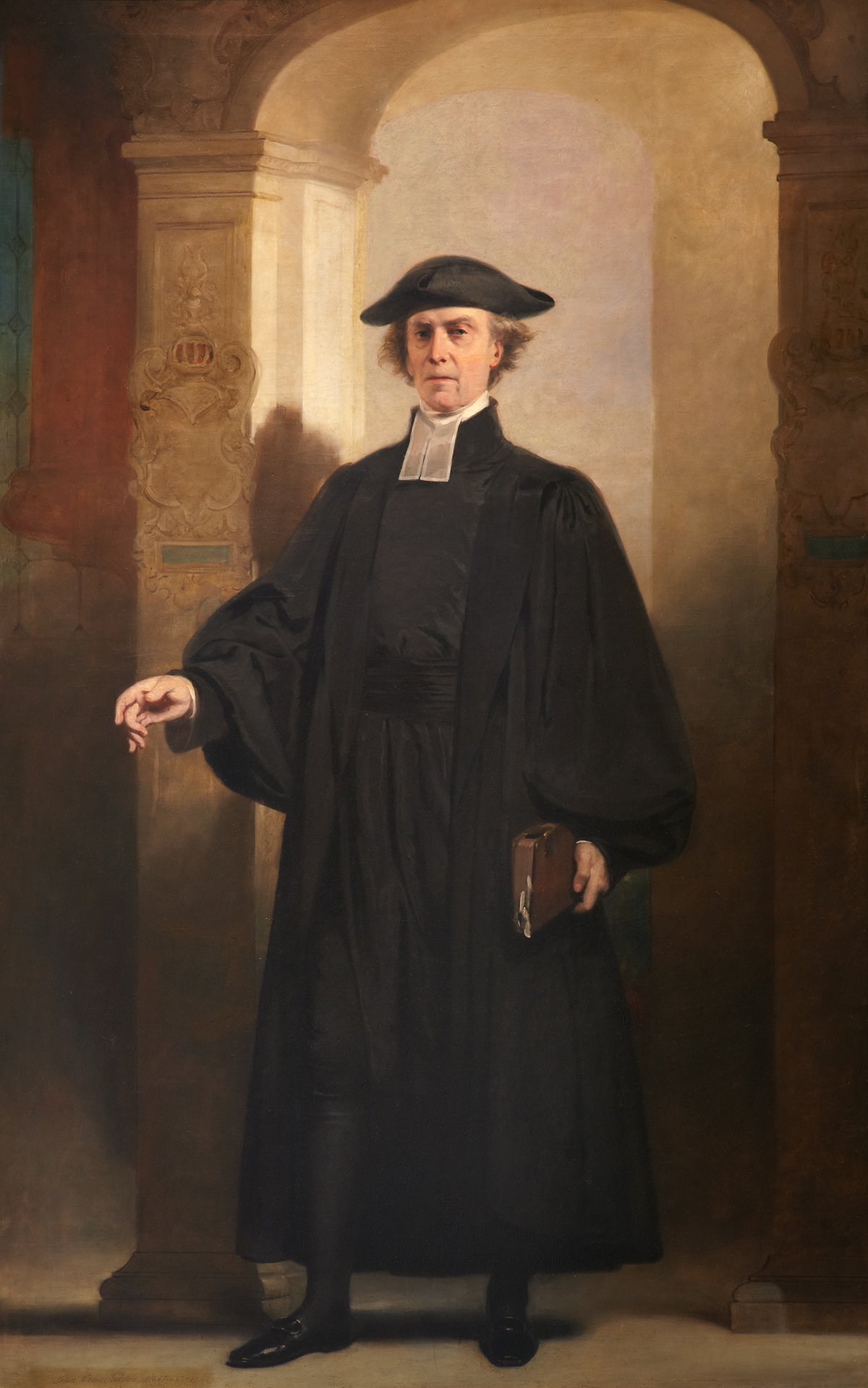
John Lee (1779–1859) by John Watson Gordon

Henry Raeburn (1756–1823) was the first significant artist to pursue his entire career in Scotland. Born in Edinburgh and returning there after a trip to Italy in 1786, he is most famous for his intimate portraits of leading figures in Scottish life, going beyond the aristocracy to lawyers, doctors, professors, writers and ministers, adding elements of Romanticism to the Grand Manner tradition of Joshua Reynolds. He became a knight in 1822 and the King's painter and limner in 1823, marking a return to the post being associated with the production of art. His pupils included the brothers William (Alexander) (1772–1841), Archibald (1765–1835) and Andrew Robertson (1777–1845). William and Archibald went on to found the Columbian Academy of Painting in New York, and Andrew to be the leading Scottish miniaturist of his day. Also associated with Radeburn towards the end of his career were John Syme (1795–1861) and Colvin Smith (1795–1875).

Of the generation of painters that followed Raeburn, David Watson (1767–1837) trained with Reynolds in London before returning home to become the first president of the Scottish Academy in 1826. The influence of both Reynolds and Raeburn can be seen in his work, including A Girl Drawing (1813) and the large group portrait The Children of the Earl of Elgin with their Nurse (c. 1805). He was followed as president of the academy by his nephew John Watson Gordon (1788–1864), who also studied with Raeburn. He painted portraits of leading cultural figures James Hogg and Lady Nairne as part of a series of portraits commissioned by William Blackwood. From the 1840s his work began to be influenced by early photography, with cool light and muted colours, as can be seen in his full-length portrait of Principal Lee (1847).

John Graham-Gilbert (1794–1866) was born in Glasgow and worked in the city from 1834, playing an important part in the professionalisation of painting there. Other figures to pursue their careers largely in portraiture and based in Glasgow included Daniel Macnee (1806–82). He moved to Edinburgh after his election of President of the Academy in 1876. Other major figures who worked in portraiture included Francis Grant, who became the first Scottish president of the Royal Academy in London, Robert Scott Lauder (1803–69), William Quiller Orchardson (1832–1910) and John Pettie (1839–93). John Zephaniah Bell (1794–1883) was educated in London and was a forerunner of the trend of Parisian education that would become common among Scottish artists of the later nineteenth century. Andrew Geddes (1783–1844) produced some landscapes, but also portraits before he finally moved to London in 1831. David Wilkie (1785–1841) worked mainly in London, and produced the flattering painting of the King George IV in Highland dress commemorating the royal visit to Scotland in 1823 that set off the international fashion for the kilt. He succeeded Raeburn as Royal Limner in 1823 and would emerge of one of the most influential British artists of the century.

== Landscape painting ==
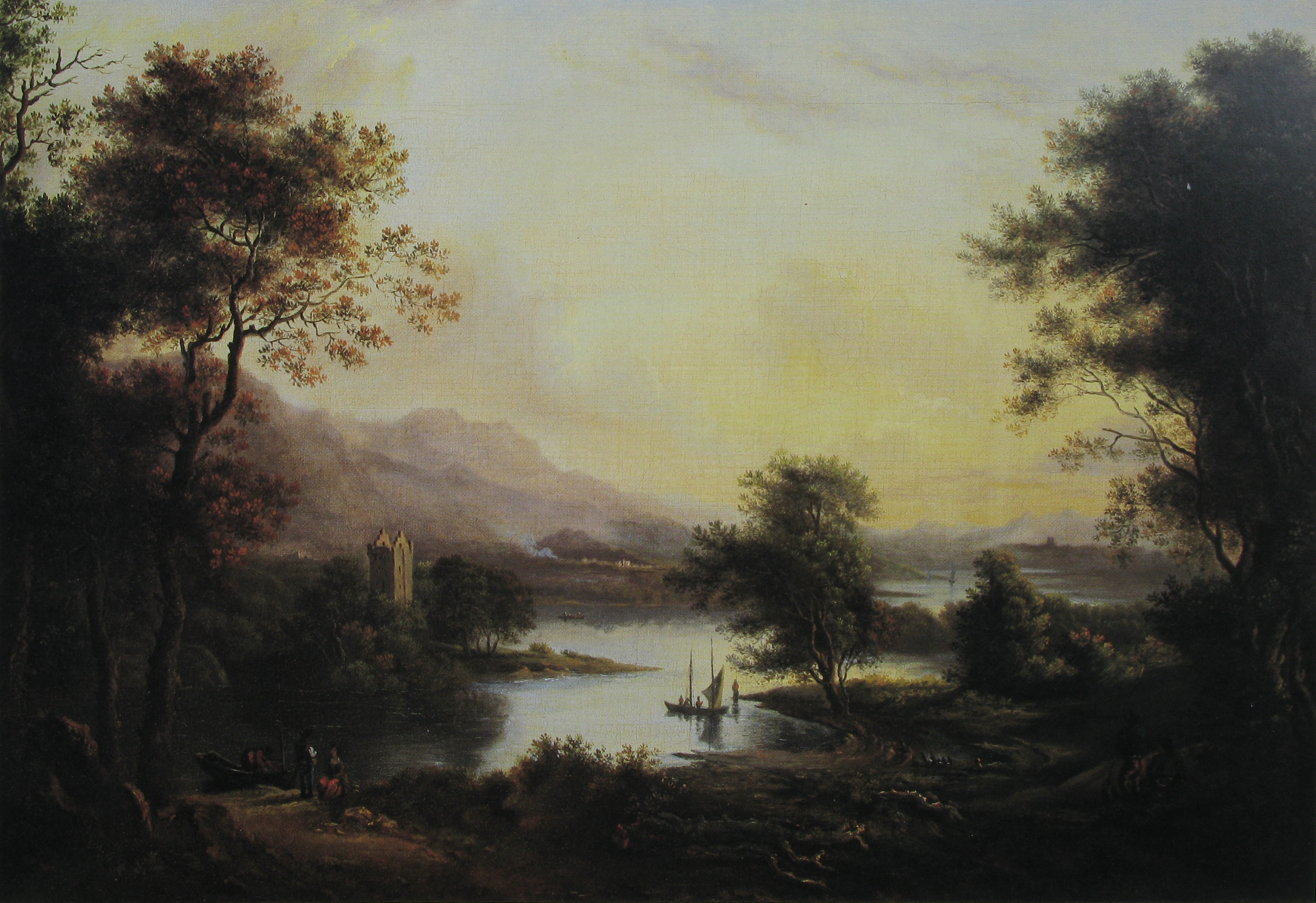
Highland Loch Landscape by Alexander Nasmyth (date unknown)

Alexander Nasmyth (1758–1840) visited Italy and worked in London, but returned to his native Edinburgh for most of his career. He produced work in a large range of forms, including his portrait of Romantic poet Robert Burns, which depicts him against a dramatic Scottish background, but he is chiefly remembered for his landscapes and is described in the Oxford Dictionary of Art as "the founder of the Scottish landscape tradition". The work of John Knox (1778–1845) continued the theme of landscape, directly linking it with the Romantic works of Walter Scott and he was also among the first artists to take a major interest in depicting the urban landscape of Glasgow. The tradition of Highland landscape painting was continued by figures such as Horatio McCulloch (1806–67), Joseph Farquharson (1846–1935) and William McTaggart (1835–1910). McCulloch's images of places including Glen Coe and Loch Lomond and the Trossachs, became parlour room panoramas that helped to define popular images of Scotland. This was helped by the Queen's declared affection for Scotland, signified by her adoption of Balmoral as a royal retreat. In this period a Scottish "grand tour" developed with large number of English artists, including Turner, flocking to the Highlands to paint and draw. From the 1870s Farquharson was a major figure in interpreting Scottish landscapes, specialising in snowscapes and sheep, and using a mobile heated studio in order to capture the conditions from life. In the same period McTaggart emerged as the leading Scottish landscape painter, he has been compared with John Constable and described as the "Scottish Impressionist", with free brushwork often depicting stormy seas and moving clouds. The fashion for coastal painting in the later nineteenth century led to the establishment of artist colonies in places such as Pittenweem and Crail in Fife, Cockburnspath in the Borders, Cambuskenneth near Stirling on the River Forth and Kirkcudbright in Dumfries and Galloway.

== Genre art and orientalism ==
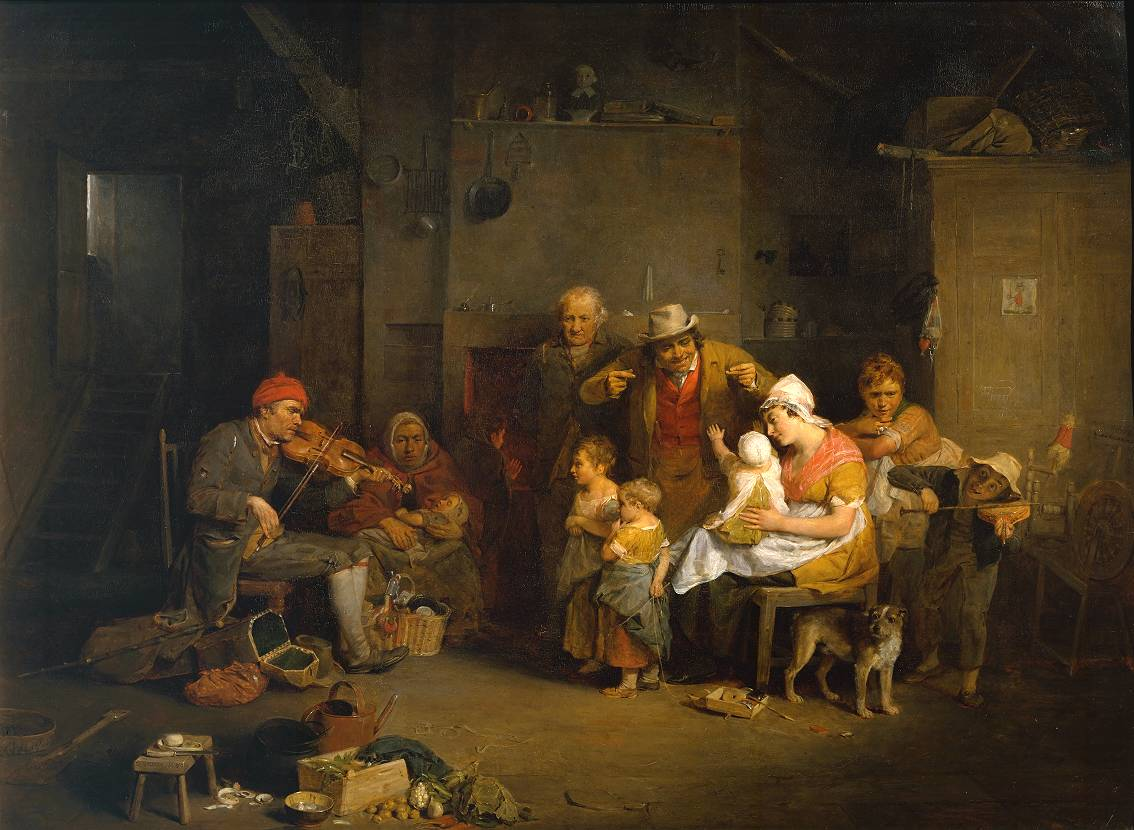
The Blind Fiddler by David Wilkie (1806)

David Wilkie became the key figure in the development of British genre art. After a tour of Europe Wilkie he was increasingly influenced by Renaissance and Baroque painting. He became most famous for his anecdotal paintings of Scottish and English life. His work on themes of Scottish everyday life included Village Politicians (1806), The Blind Fiddler (1806), Distraining for Rent (1815) and The Penny Wedding (1818). His most famous work was The Chelsea Pensioners reading the Waterloo Dispatch, one of the most popular exhibitions in London in 1822. His sketch Knox preaching before the Lords of the Congregation (1822), dealt with the historic themes that would become a major part of Scottish painting in the second half of the century and he would also be a major influence on oriental painting. Scottish painters influenced by Wilkie included John Burnet (1784–1868), Alexander George Fraser (1785–1865) and Walter Geikie (1795–1837). A younger generation that took genre painting into the late nineteenth century included Erskine Nicol (1825–1904) and the brothers John (1818–1902) and Thomas Faed (1826–1900). Major themes included the Reformation, particularly scenes involving John Knox and Mary Queen of Scots, the Covenanters, especially the "Killing Time" of the 1680s, and the Jacobites.

The expedition to Egypt led by Napoleon in 1798 began the European trend for Orientalism. For British artists the Revolutionary and Napoleonic Wars (1793–1815) disrupted the established routes to Rome, while military expeditions to the Middle East and Spain created new areas of interest. William Allan (1782–1850) travelled in Russia and Turkey from 1805 to 1822 and painted pictures of Russians and Turkish life. He travelled again to Turkey in the 1830s, which resulted in the production of works including The Slave Market: Constantinople (1838). David Wilkie also visited the Middle East in search of authentic settings and decor for Biblical paintings. David Roberts (1796–1864) became known for his prolific series of detailed lithograph prints of Egypt and the Near East that he produced during the 1840s from sketches he made during long tours of the region. John Phillip (1817–67) travelled in Europe from 1851. He became known as "Spanish Philip" from his scenes of Spanish life, such as La Gloria: a Spanish Wake (1864).

== Sculpture ==
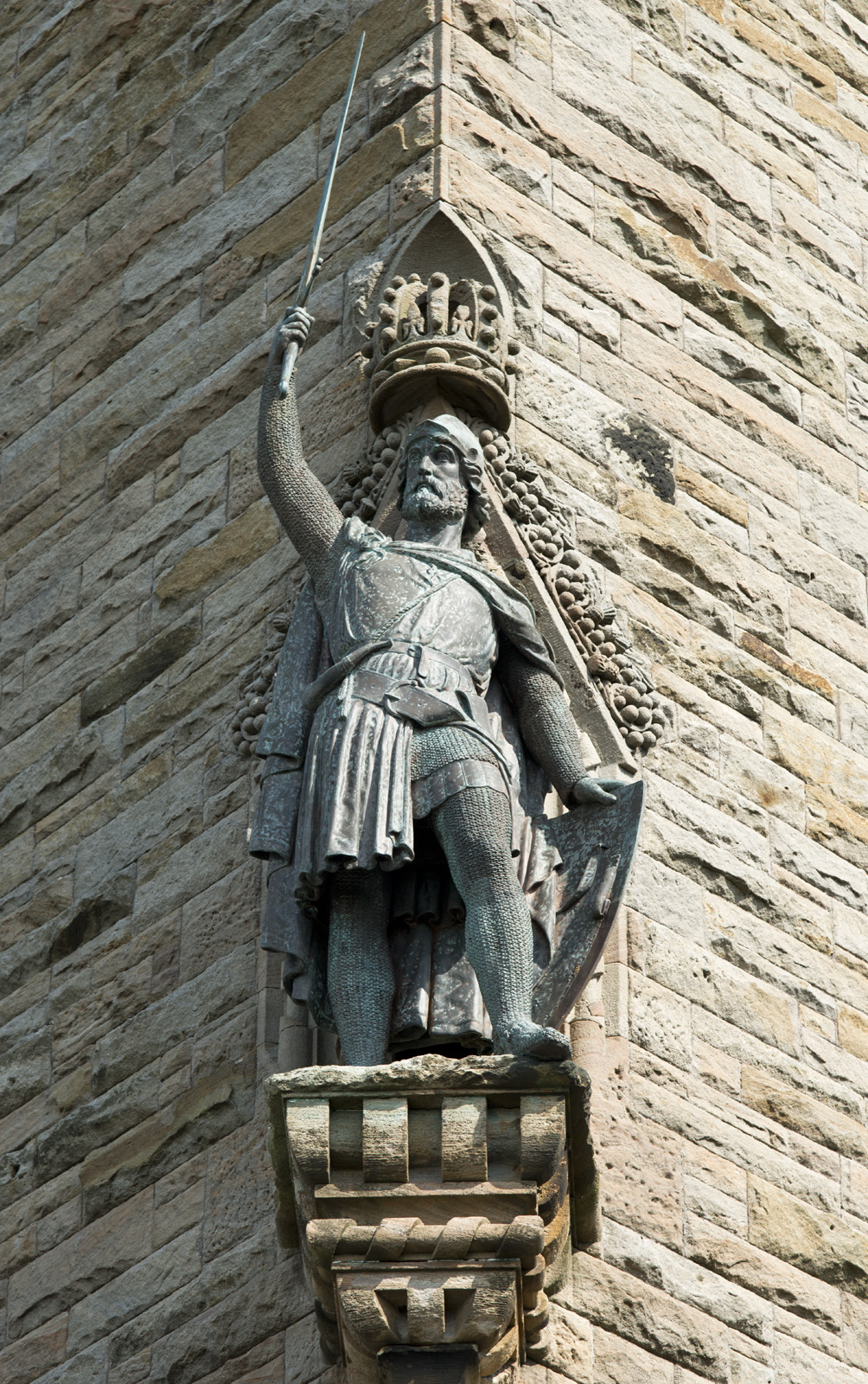
David Watson Stevenson's statue of William Wallace on the exterior of the Wallace Monument

While opportunities and training for painters had made advances by the beginning of the nineteenth century, a Scottish tradition of sculpture was slower to emerge. In the early decades of the century commissions continued to be given to English artists, including Samuel Joseph (1791–1850), who was working in Edinburgh in 1821–29 and was a founding member of the Scottish Academy. Thomas Campbell (c. 1790–1858) studied in London and settled in Rome, where he received commissions from visiting British subjects before returning to London in 1830. His works in Scotland included the Hopetoun Memorial (1824–34) in Edinburgh. Lawrence Macdonald (1799–1878) was able to study at the Trustees Academy in Edinburgh and then Rome. He returned to Edinburgh from 1827, but moved back to Rome in 1832, where he worked for the rest of his life. His most significant works included his busts of General David Baird and of the phrenologist George Combe (c. 1830).

The first significant Scottish sculptor to pursue their career in Scotland was John Steell (1804–91). He trained at the Trustee's Academy and in Rome and was elected to the Scottish Academy in 1830 while still in his twenties. His first work to gain significant public attention was his Alexander and Bucephasus. His 1832 design for a statue of Sir Water Scott was incorporated into the author's memorial in Edinburgh. It marked the beginnings of a national school of sculpture based around major figures from Scottish culture and Scottish and British history. The tradition of Scottish sculpture was taken forward by artists such as Patric Park (1811–55), Alexander Handyside Ritchie (1804–70) and William Calder Marshall (1813–94). This reached fruition in the next generation of sculptors including William Brodie (1815–81), Amelia Hill (1820–1904) and Steell's apprentice David Watson Stevenson (1842–1904). Stevenson contributed the statue of William Wallace on the exterior of the Wallace Monument and many of the busts in the gallery of heroes inside, which included Robert the Bruce, John Knox, Walter Scott, Robert Burns, James Watt and Thomas Carlyle. Public sculpture was boosted by the centenary of Burns' death in 1896. Stevenson produced a statue of the poet in Leith. Hill produced one for Dumfries. John Steell produced a statue for Central Park in New York, versions of which were made for Dundee, London and Dunedin. Statues of Burns and Scott were produced in areas of Scottish settlement, particularly in North America and Australia.

== Photography ==
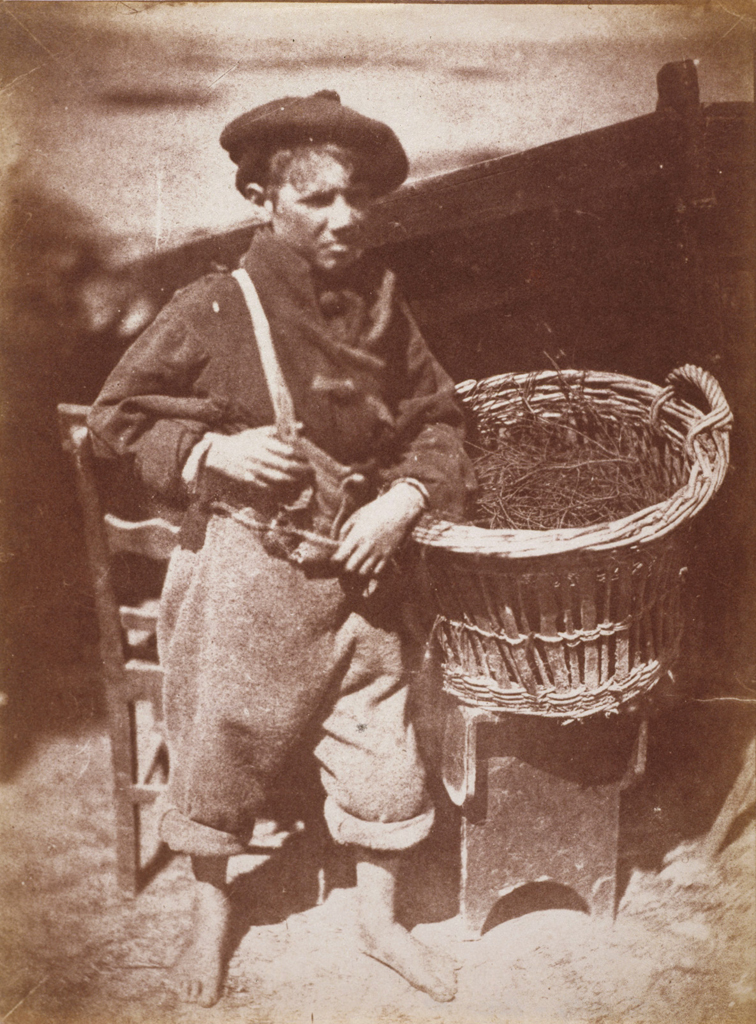
His Faither's Breeks, by Hill & Adamson (1843–47)

According to photo historian David Burn "there is a good case to be made for the proposition that the greatest contribution that Scotland has made to the visual arts, possibly to the arts as a whole, is in the art of photography". In the early nineteenth century Scottish scientists James Clerk Maxwell and David Brewster played a major part in the development of the techniques of photography. Pioneering photographers included chemist Robert Adamson (1821–48) and artist David Octavius Hill (1821–48), who as Hill & Adamson formed the first photographic studio in Scotland at Rock House in Edinburgh in 1843. Their output of around 3,000 calotype images in four years are considered some of the first and finest artistic uses of photography.

Adamson trained Thomas Roger (1833–88) of St. Andrews, who was one of the first commercial photographers and beside commercial portraits, produced many genre style compositions. Other pioneers included Thomas Annan (1829–87), who took portraits and landscapes, and whose photographs of the Glasgow slums were among the first to use the medium as a social record. his son James Craig Annan (1864–1946) also popularised the work of Hill & Adamson in the US and worked with American photographic pioneer Alfred Stieglitz (1864–1946). Both pioneered the more stable photogravure process. Other important figures included Thomas Keith (1827–95), one of the first architectural photographers. George Washington Wilson (1823–93) pioneered instant photography and landscape photography, becoming "photographer to the Queen" and his Aberdeen company was the largest producer of topographical prints by 1880. Clementina Hawarden (1822–65) produced posed portraits that were among the first in a tradition of female photography. In the 1850s amateur photographer Mary Jane Matherson took her camera outside to create compositions that can be described as genre art, including A Picnic in the Glen and An Angler at Rest.

== Influence of the Nazarenes and Pre-Raphaelites ==
Scottish artists of the mid-nineteenth century were influenced by the painters of the Nazarene movement, a group of German artists based in Rome, who attempted to revive the spirituality of Medieval and Early Renaissance art. They were also influenced by, and influenced, the work of the English Pre-Raphaelite Brotherhood, who rejected the formalism of Mannerist painting after Raphael. David Scott's (1806–49) learnt the art of fresco painting from the Nazarenes. He painted historical works, such as The Poles did nobly and the Russian General Craved and Armistice to bury his Dead (1832) and Traitor's Gate (1842). His most ambitious historical work was the triptych Sir William Wallace, Scottish Wars: the Spear and English War: the Bow (1843). He also produced etchings for versions of Coleridge's Ancient Mariner, Bunyan's Pilgrim's Progress and J. P. Nichol's Architecture of the Heavens (1850). Because of this early death he was known to, and admired by, the Pre-Raphaelites mainly through his brother William Bell Scott (1811–90), who became a close friend of founding member D. G. Rossetti. His most famous work, Iron and Coal was one of the most popular Victorian images and one of the few to fulfill the Pre-Raphaelite ambition to depict the modern world.

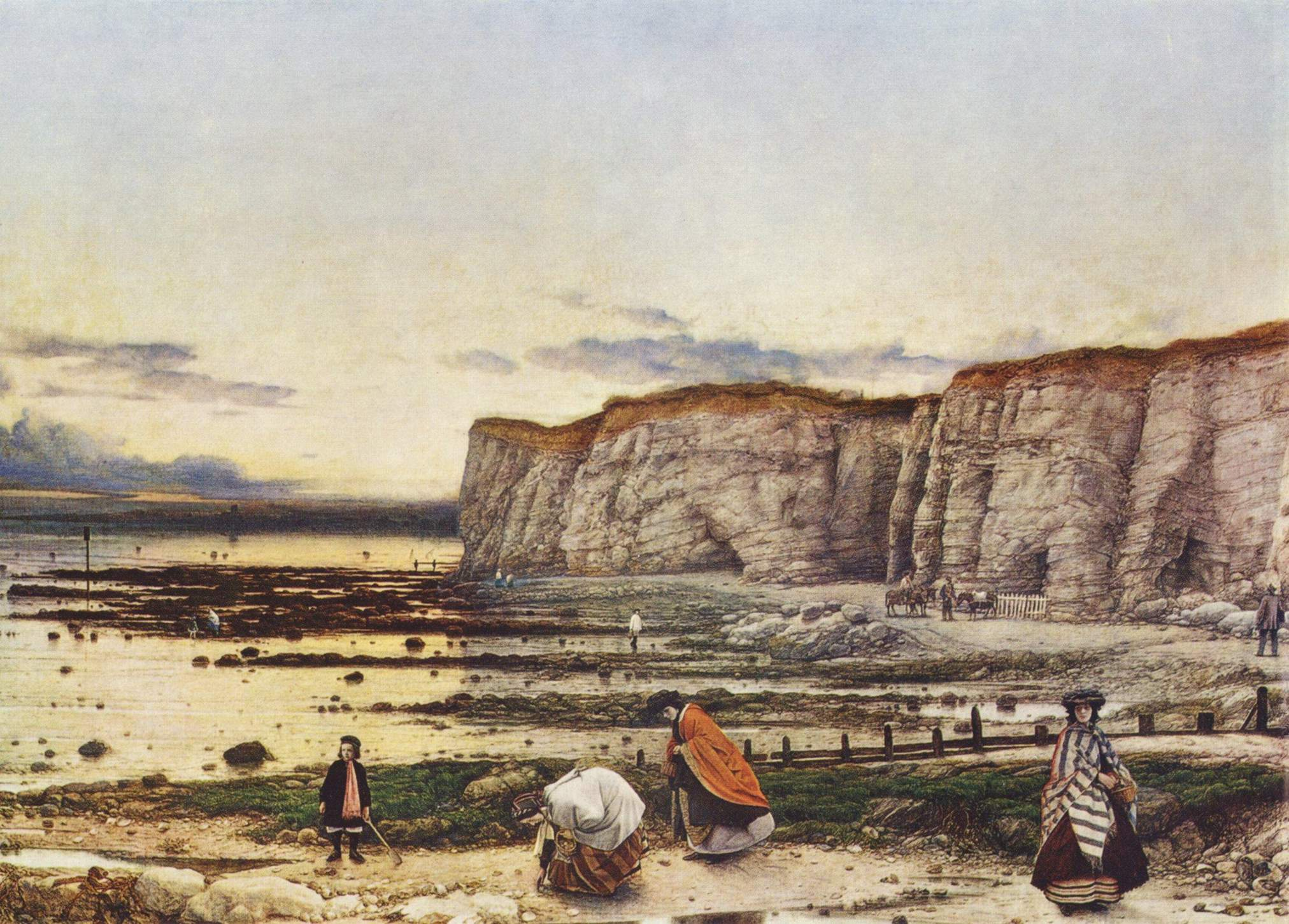
William Dyce Pegwell Bay, Kent – a Recollection of October 5th 1858 (c. 1859–60)

The figure in Scottish art most associated with the Pre-Raphaelites was the Aberdeen-born William Dyce (1806–64). He met the Nazarenes while in Italy and his work moved towards their "early Christian" art, as can be seen in his Madonna and Child (1848). Dyce befriended the young Pre-Raphaelites in London and introduced their work to John Ruskin. His later work was Pre-Raphaelite in its spirituality, as can be seen in his The Man of Sorrows and David in the Wilderness (both 1860). His Pegwell Bay: a Recollection of October 5th 1858 has been described as "the archetypal pre-Raphaelite landscape". Joseph Noel Paton (1821–1901) studied at the Royal Academy schools in London, where he became a friend of John Everett Millais and he subsequently followed him into Pre-Raphaelitism, producing pictures that stressed detail and melodrama such as The Bludie Tryst (1855). His later paintings, like those of Millais, have been criticised for descending into popular sentimentality. Also influenced by Millais was James Archer (1823–1904) and whose work includes Summertime, Gloucestershire (1860) and who from 1861 began a series of Arthurian-based paintings including La Morte d'Arthur and Sir Lancelot and Queen Guinevere.

== Arts and Crafts ==
The beginnings of the Arts and Crafts movement in Scotland were in the stained glass revival of the 1850s, pioneered by James Ballantine (1808–77). His major works included the great west window of Dunfermline Abbey and the scheme for St. Giles Cathedral, Edinburgh. In Glasgow it was pioneered by Daniel Cottier (1838–91), who had probably studied with Ballantine, and was directly influenced by William Morris, Ford Madox Brown and John Ruskin. His key works included the Baptism of Christ in Paisley Abbey (c. 1880). Among his followers were Stephen Adam and his son of the same name. The Glasgow-born designer and theorist Christopher Dresser (1834–1904) was one of the first, and most important, independent designers, a pivotal figure in the Aesthetic Movement and a major contributor to the allied Anglo-Japanese movement. He produced carpets, ceramics, furniture, glass, graphics, metalwork, including silver and electroplate, including his angular teapot of 1879.

== Celtic Revival ==
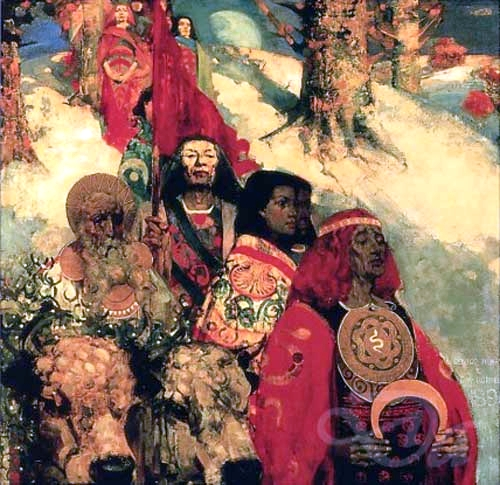
Druids Bringing in the Mistletoe by E. A. Hornel (c. 1890)

The formation of the Edinburgh Social Union in 1885, which included a number of significant figures in the Arts and Craft and Aesthetic movements, became part of an attempt to facilitate a Celtic Revival, similar to that taking place in contemporaneous Ireland, drawing on ancient myths and history to produce art in a modern idiom. Key figures were the philosopher, sociologist, town planner and writer Patrick Geddes (1854–1932), the architect and designer Robert Lorimer (1864–1929) and stained-glass artist Douglas Strachan (1875–1950). Geddes established an informal college of tenement flats for artists at Ramsay Garden on Castle Hill in Edinburgh in the 1890s. Among the figures involved with the movement were Anna Traquair (1852–1936), who was commissioned by the Union to paint murals in the Mortuary Chapel of the Hospital for Sick Children, Edinburgh (1885–86 and 1896–98) and also worked in metal, illumination, illustration, embroidery and book binding.

The most significant exponent of the revival was Dundee-born John Duncan (1866–1945), who was also influenced by Italian Renaissance art and French Symbolism. Among his most influential works are his paintings of Celtic subjects Tristan and Iseult (1912) and St Bride (1913). Other Dundee Symbolists included Stewart Carmichael (1879–1901), the later-born Ancell Stronach (1901–1988) and George Dutch Davidson (1869–1950). Duncan was a major contributor to Geddes' magazine The Evergreen. Other major contributors included the Japanese-influenced Robert Burns (1860–1941), E. A. Hornel (1864–1933) and Duncan's student Helen Hay (fl. 1895–1953).

== Glasgow School ==
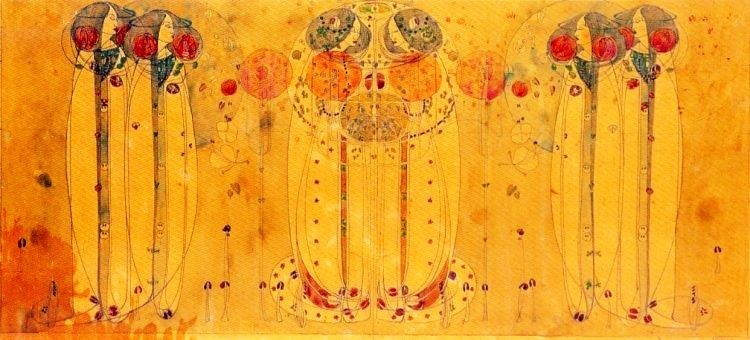
Charles Rennie Mackintosh The Wassail (1900)

Developments in late nineteenth-century Scottish art are associated with the Glasgow School, a term that is used for a number of loose groups based around the city. The first and largest group, active from about 1880, were the Glasgow Boys, including James Guthrie (1859–1930), Joseph Crawhall (1861–1913), George Henry (1858–1943) and E. A. Walton (1860–1922). They reacted against the commercialism and sentimentality of earlier artists, particularly the work associated with Royal Academy. They were particularly influenced by London-based US artist James Abbott McNeill Whistler and French painting, incorporated elements of impressionism and realism into their work. They have been credited with rejuvenating Scottish art and with making Glasgow a major cultural centre. The energy generated by these groups spread across the city and created a huge interest and demand in art degrees and courses and served to spawn numerous other artists such as the landscape painter Archibald Kay through the work of the Glasgow School of Art.

A slightly later grouping, active from about 1890 and known as "The Four" or the "Spook School", was composed of acclaimed architect and artist Charles Rennie Mackintosh (1868–1928), his wife the painter and glass artist Margaret MacDonald (1865–1933), her sister the artist Frances (1873–1921), and her husband, the artist and teacher Herbert MacNair (1868–1955). They produced a distinctive blend of influences, including the Celtic Revival, the Arts and Crafts Movement, and Japonisme, which found favour throughout the modern art world of continental Europe and helped define the Art Nouveau style that would come to prominence in the early twentieth century.
