= James M. Burnet =

Scottish painter

James Burnet
- Born: James M. Burnet; 1788; Musselburgh, Scotland
- Died: 1816 (aged 27–28); Lee
- Education: Edinburgh College of Art

James M. Burnet (1788–1816) was a Scottish painter of rural scenes, based in the London area for most of his career.

== Life ==
He was born in Musselburgh in 1788, the fourth son of George Burnet, general surveyor of excise in Scotland, and his wife Anne Cruikshank (sister of anatomist William Cruikshank, and from an artistically inclined family). The painter and engraver John Burnet was his elder brother. While apprenticed to a wood carver named Liddel he also studied art at John Graham's evening classes at the Trustees' Academy in Edinburgh. In 1810, having decided to devote himself to painting, he moved to London, where his brother John was already working.

== Style and influences ==
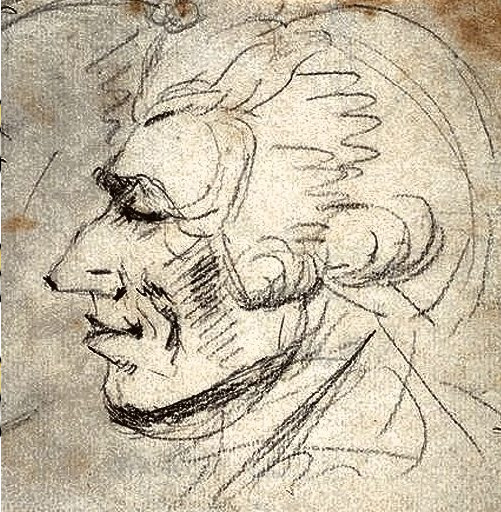
James M. Burnet, Caricature of Sawrey Gilpin (date unknown) Tate Gallery

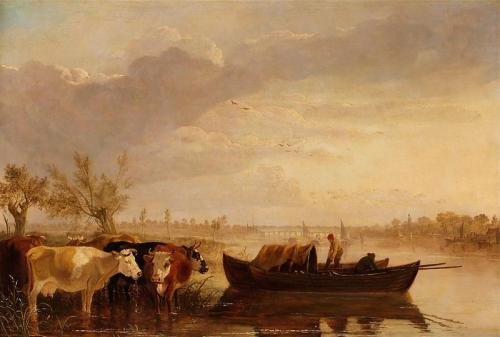
James M. Burnet, Old Chelsea Bridge (1799) Aberdeen Art Gallery

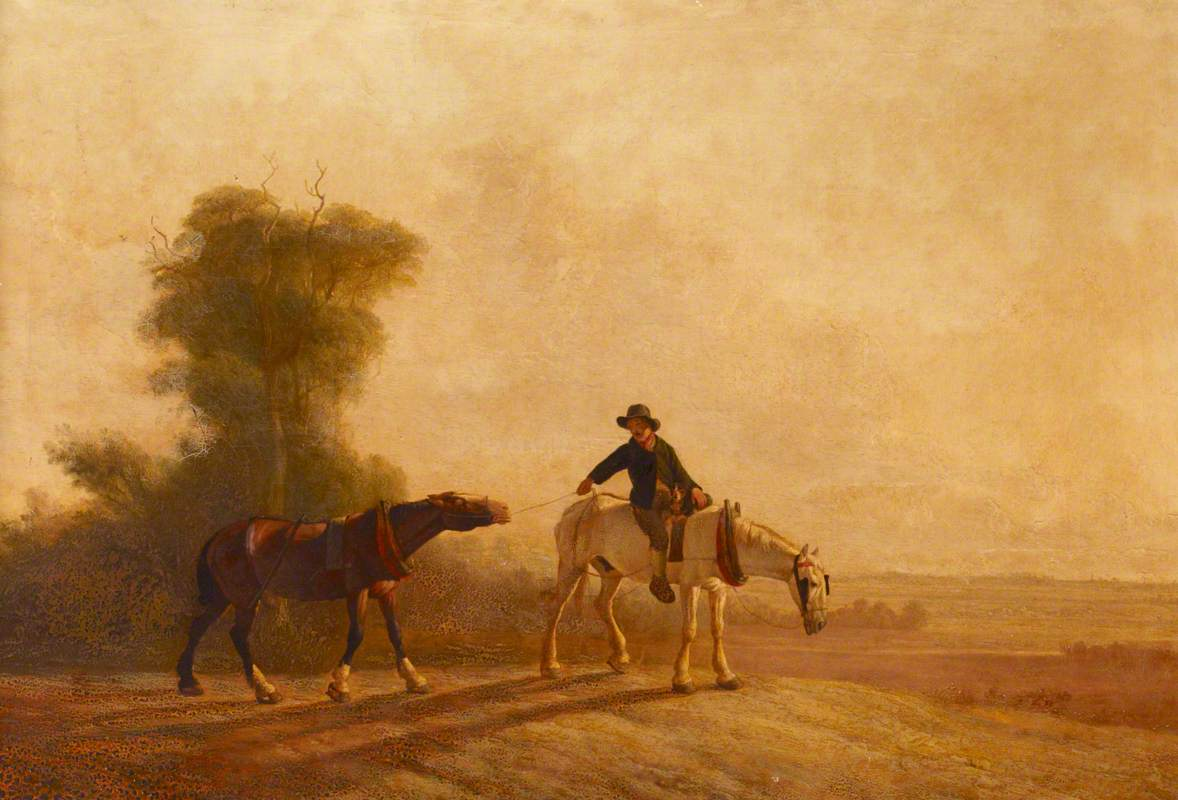
James M. Burnet, Landscape, Boy with Farm Horses (1813) Egremont Collection, Petworth House

Impressed by the work of David Wilkie, whose The Blind Fiddler John Burnet was then engraving, and the Dutch paintings he saw in London, especially those of Aelbert Cuyp and Paulus Potter, James was inspired towards a naturalistic approach in his paintings. He had a studio in Chelsea – his address is given in the Royal Academy catalogues as 26, St. George's Row – and based his landscapes on sketches made in the area around Fulham and Battersea, which was then still largely rural. He exhibited at the Royal Academy between 1812 and 1814. Many of his paintings feature cattle. Allan Cunningham wrote:

Some of our cattle-painters, imagining that the more flesh cows have the more milk they will give, have plumped them up into a condition for the butcher, but not for the milk-pail. Burnet knew that a moderately lean cow produced most milk, and in this way he drew them. But in all that he did he desired to tell a story. This he knew would give interest to his works, and produce at the same time action, expression, and variety. Nor did he confine his studies to the fields alone: he made himself familiar with the indoor as well as outdoor economy of a farmer's household during seed-time, summer, harvest, and winter; he left no implement of husbandry unsketched, and scarcely any employment of the husbandman without delineation.

While sketching in the fields he also made detailed notes about the effects of light and cloud formations.

== Legacy ==
Burnet died of tuberculosis, a painter "of no common power", at Lee (then in Kent) on 27 July 1816, at the age of 28, and was buried in Lewisham churchyard.

Two paintings, once belonging to noted collector John Sheepshanks are in the Victoria and Albert Museum. Burnet is also represented at the Tate, Aberdeen Art Gallery, and numerous other British museums.
