= James Burnett =

James Burnett or Burnet may refer to:

- James Burnett, Lord Monboddo (1714–1799), Scottish judge, scholar of linguistic evolution, philosopher and deist
- James Charles Burnett (1815–1854), surveyor and explorer in New South Wales, Australia
- Sir James Burnett, 13th Baronet (1880–1953), British Army officer
- James Burnett (rugby union) (born 1947), Scottish rugby union player
- James K. Burnett (1862–1948), California politician
- James M. Burnet (1788–1816), Scottish painter
