= John Graham (Scottish painter) =

Scottish painter (1754–1817)

- Born: John Graham c. 1754; Edinburgh, Scotland
- Died: 1 November 1817 (aged 62–63)
- Known for: Painting

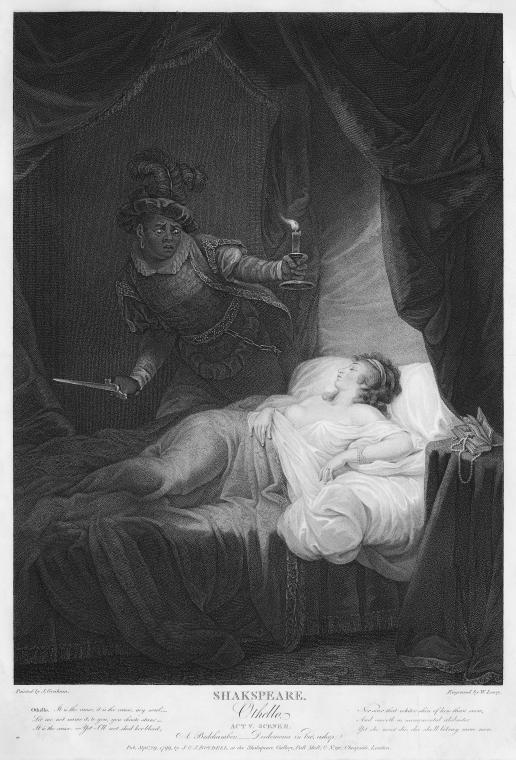
A Bedchamber, Desdemona in Bed asleep (Act V, scene 2), illustrating Othello, by John Graham for John Boydell's Shakespeare folio

John Graham (c. 1754 – 1 November 1817) was an 18th-century Scottish painter and teacher of art.

== Life ==
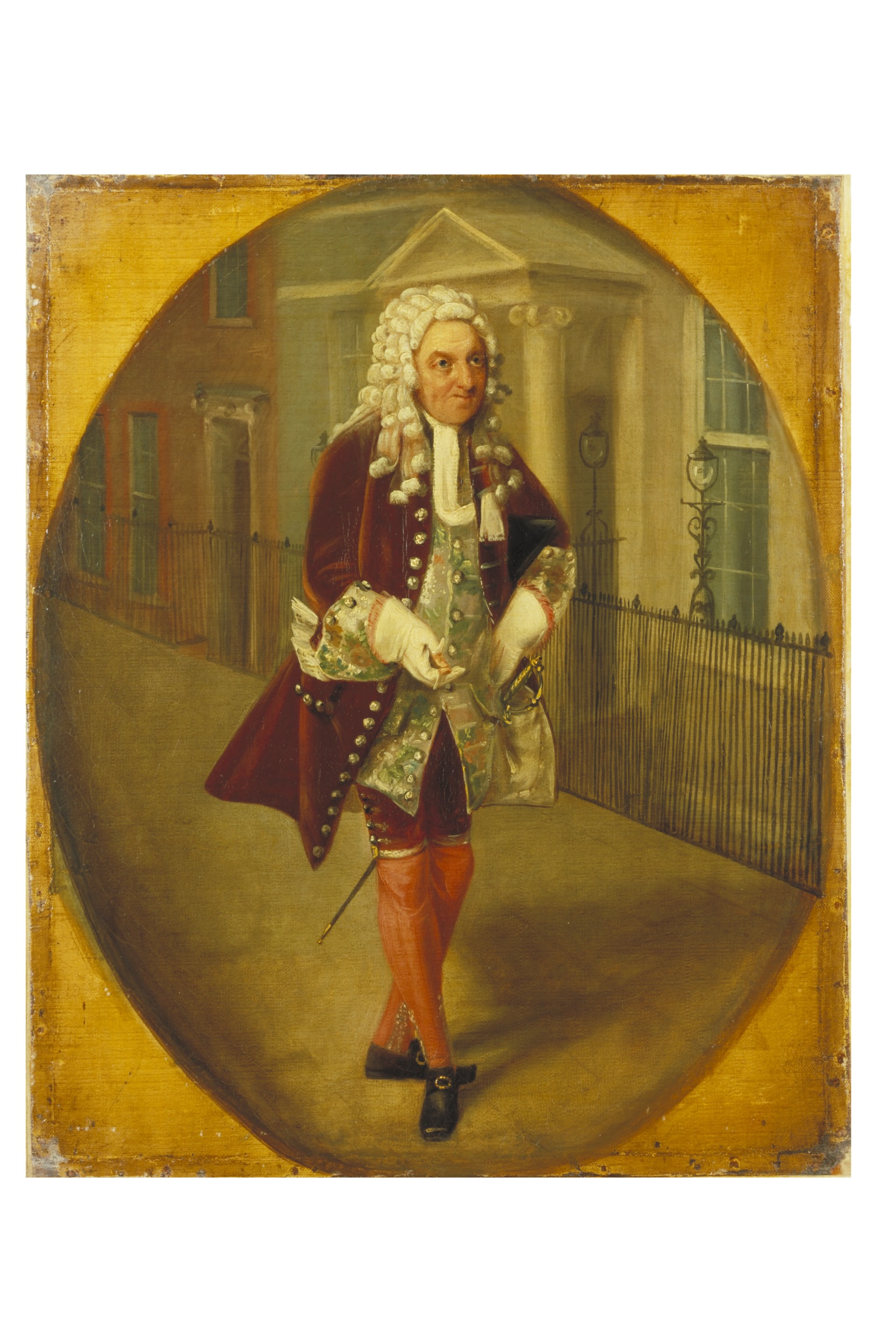
Richard Suett as Bayes in The Rehearsal by George Villiers, 2nd Duke of Buckingham (1796, Victoria and Albert Museum).

Graham was born in Edinburgh and apprenticed to a coach-painter in Edinburgh, George MacFarquhar. He next moved to London and became a coach-painter. He started studying at the Royal Academy Schools and exhibited there between 1780 and 1797. Graham also painted an Othello and Desdemona for John Boydell's Shakespeare Gallery.

Graham was nominated four times between 1793 and 1797 for associate membership to the Royal Academy, but failed to win election. Duncan Thomson, in his article in the Oxford Dictionary of National Biography, paraphrases Joseph Farington, who told Thomas Lawrence, that "Graham was a candidate he would certainly not vote for, in what he considered a very weak field." Thomson speculates that these failures prompted Graham to consider returning to Scotland.

Through the influence of the banker Sir William Forbes, Graham acquired the position of "public Teacher of Art" in Edinburgh in 1798. The painter Benjamin West, who had called Graham "an ingenious man", "felt he was ideally suited for the position." The board of trustees for fisheries, manufactures, and improvements, forerunners of the trustees of the National Galleries of Scotland, had established a drawing academy in 1760 to improve industrial design. Before officially starting his labors, Graham held a public exhibition of his work in Edinburgh. The academy followed the system of the Royal Academy Schools, but did not include drawing from life. Concerned that he was "perceived only as a teacher of artists sponsored by the board", Graham took on several private students, girls at one time of the day and boys at another. Twelve lessons cost two guineas.

According to Armstrong, Betterton, Johnstone, Stephen, and Thomson, he was an "inspirational and effective" teacher and "a number of important nineteenth-century Scottish artists benefited from his teaching—David Wilkie, William Allan, John Burnet, Alexander Fraser, Walter Geikie, John Watson Gordon, John Henning, and William Home Lizars. In 1859, the Royal Scottish Academy bought his The Disobedient Prophet, writing of Graham that he was a "Master to whom Scottish Art had been considerably indebted". The painting hung in the National Gallery of Scotland until 1896, when it disappeared. Graham painted portraits, including one of the actress Tryphosa Jane Wallis, and Alderman John Boydell. He also painted animal pictures, such as the series of lion and tiger paintings he made of the menagerie in the Tower of London.

Graham died at his home "after a severe and lingering illness" on 1 November 1817.

== Works ==
- Daniel in the lions' den (1780)
- Una (1783)
- Ceres in Search of Proserpine (1786)
- The Escape of Mary, Queen of Scots, from Lochleven Castle, presented by Alderman Boydell with a portrait of himself, also of Graham, at Stationers' Hall
- Mary, the Morning before her Execution (1792)
- King David instructing Salomon (1797)
- The Funeral of General Fraser at Saratoga
- The Disobedient Prophet, National Gallery of Scotland
