= Alexander George Fraser =

Scottish painter

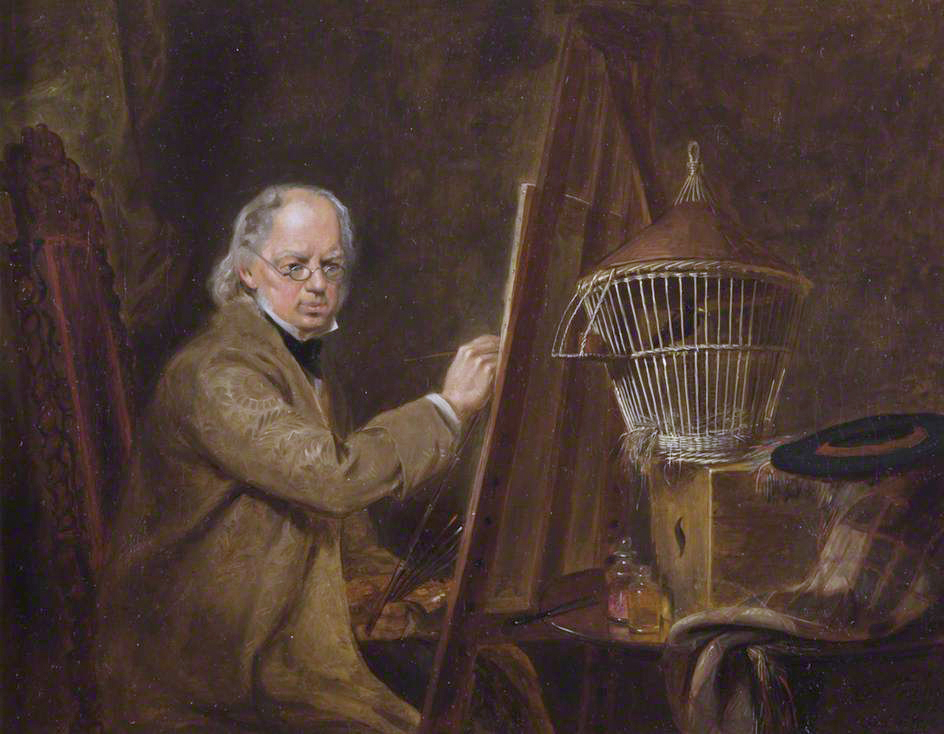
- Self portrait (1854)
- Born: 7 April 1786; Edinburgh, Scotland, UK
- Died: 15 February 1865 (aged 78); Wood Green, Hornsey, London
- Education: Trustees Drawing Academy of Edinburgh.
- Known for: Genre and Domestic Painting
- Spouse: Janet William Moir
- Elected: Associate of the Royal Scottish Academy

Alexander George Fraser (1786–1865) was a Scottish genre and domestic painter who exhibited his paintings at the Royal Academy in London for many years. His son, Alexander Fraser (1827-1899), was also a prominent artist with whom he is sometimes confused (and his paintings are sometimes misidentified as being by his son).

== Life ==
Fraser was born in Edinburgh on 7 April 1786. His father was Alexander Fraser, a grocer, and his mother, Madgalane Davie.

He studied painting under John Graham (1754-1817) at the Trustees Drawing Academy of Edinburgh. His fellow pupils included William Allan (1782–1850), John Burnet (1784–1868), and David Wilkie (1785–1841). He began exhibiting at the Royal Academy in 1810 and moved to London in 1813. David Wilkie had preceded him to London and he employed Fraser as an assistant to paint details and still life in his pictures. Of Wilkie's many followers, Fraser was the most capable. Many of his paintings were humorous and on a small scale, for example, The Scotch Fair (c. 1834) or Music Makers. On 30 June 1826, he married Janet William Moir in Edinburgh, and Alexander Fraser was their son. In 1840, Fraser was elected an associate of the Royal Scottish Academy, an institution he had helped to found. In 1842, his Naaman Cured of the Leprosy obtained the premium at the British Institution for best picture of the year. From 1848, ill health prevented him from painting and he ceased exhibiting at the Royal Academy.

He died at Wood Green, Hornsey, London on 15 February 1865 and was buried in a common grave on the eastern side of Highgate Cemetery (plot no. 13621) eight days later.

== Notable paintings ==
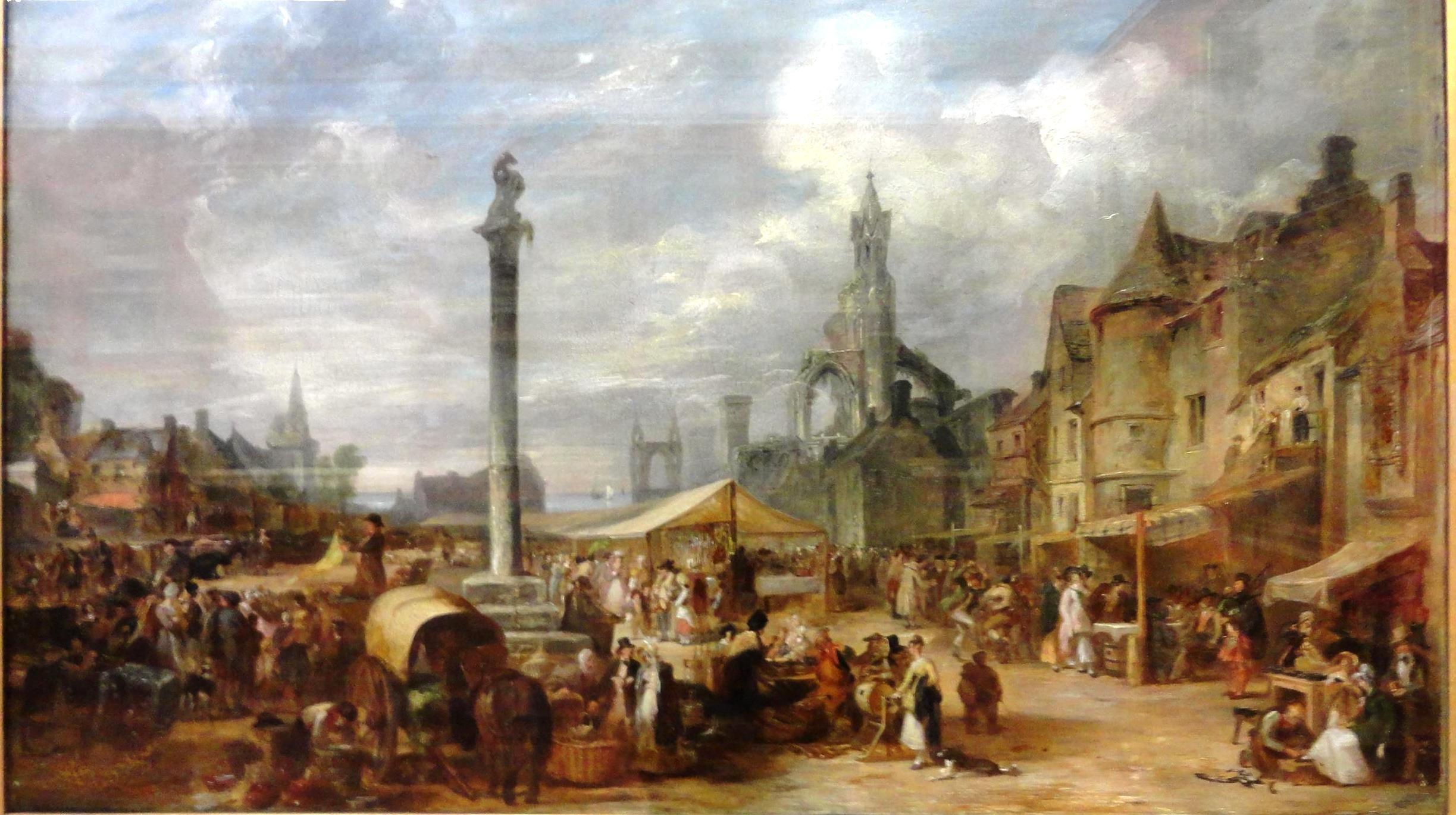
The Scotch Fair (c. 1834) The background of the painting consists of a collation of features to be found in St Andrews, St Monans and Culross.

- Playing at Draughts (1809)
- A Green Stall (1810)
- Boy feeding Rabbits (1811)
- The New Coat (1812)
- Preparing for Fish Market (1812)
- A Portrait of a Young Man (1816) (National Gallery of Scotland)
- At the Well (1829) (private collection)
- A Highland Sportsman (1832) (National Gallery of Scotland)
- The Scotch Fair (1834) (Dundee Art Gallery and Museum)
- Music Makers
- Robinson Crusoe Explaining the Scriptures to Friday (1836) (Liverpool Collection - Walker Art Gallery)
- The Haggis Feast (1840)
- Naaman Cured of the Leprosy (1842)
- The Goose Girl (Sheffield Museums Collection)
- Smoking the Cobbler (Glasgow Museums Collection - Pollok House)
- Opening Oysters (McManus Art Galleries, Dundee)
- Ale Cellar, tapping the barrel (1854)
- Self Portrait (1854)
