= Alexander Fraser (painter) =

Scottish landscape painter (1827–1899)

- Born: 3 November 1827; Woodcockdale, near Linlithgow, Scotland, UK
- Died: 24 May 1899 (aged 71); Musselburgh, Scotland
- Education: Trustees Drawing Academy of Edinburgh.
- Known for: Landscape Painting
- Spouse: Jane Duncan
- Elected: Associate of the Royal Scottish Academy

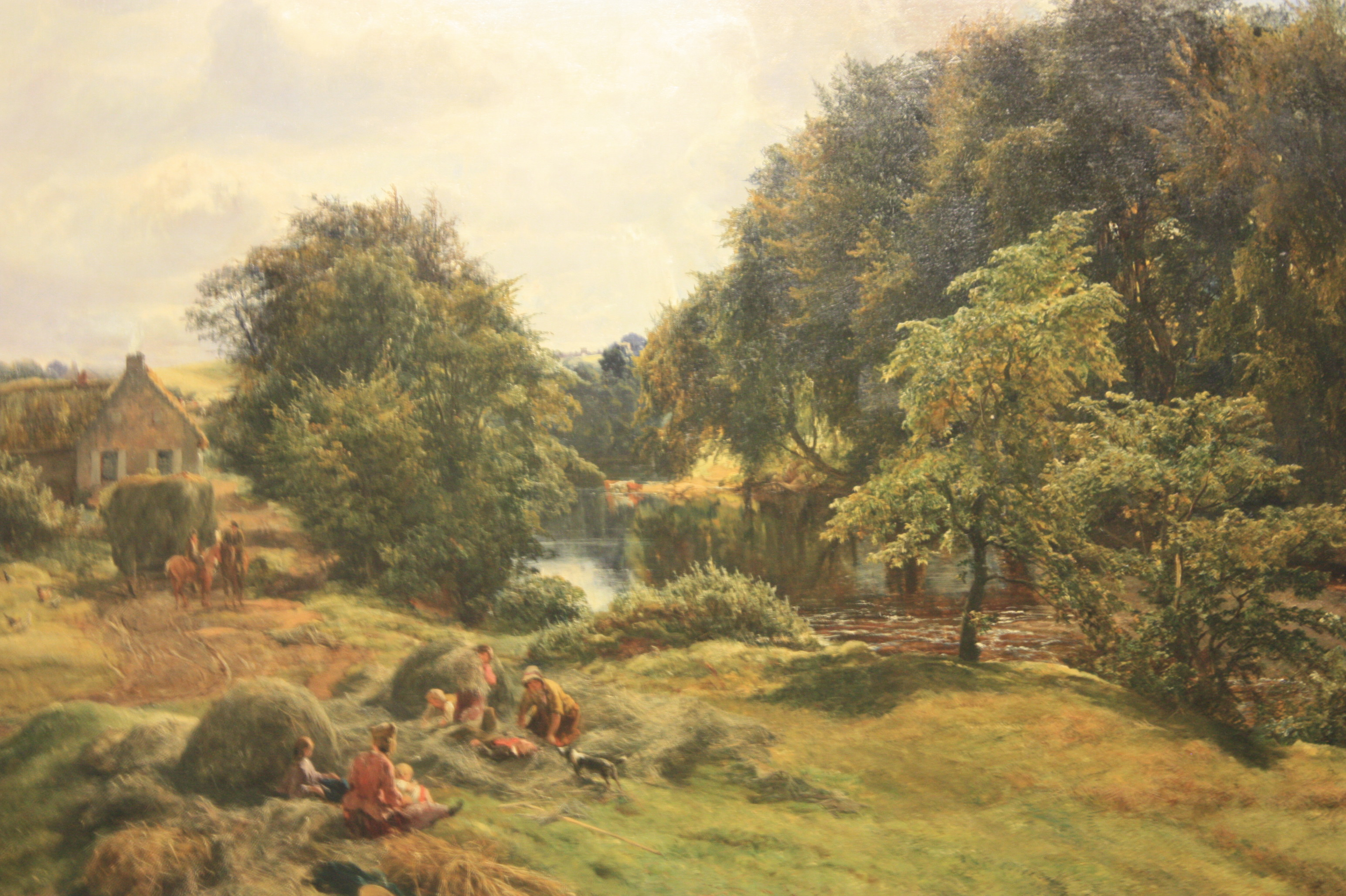
Haymaking on the Avon by Alexander Fraser RSA

Alexander Fraser ARSA (1858) RSA (1862) (1827 –1899) was a Scottish landscape painter who is also known as Alexander Fraser the Younger as his father, Alexander George Fraser (1786–1865), was also a Scottish painter. Fraser was the biographer of the Scottish artist, Horatio McCulloch.

== Early life ==
Alexander Fraser was born at Woodcockdale, near Linlithgow on 3 November 1827 and was baptised on 11 January 1828 at Linlithgow. Fraser's mother was Jessie Moir. His education began in Glasgow but he had most of his schooling at Lanark Grammar School, exhibiting frequently at the Glasgow Institute of Fine Arts. From there he went on to study art at the Trustees Academy Edinburgh. By the age of thirty he was already an Associate of the Royal Scottish Academy.

He married Jane Duncan on 15 April 1859 in Edinburgh and they had a son and daughter. He died on 24 May 1899 at Musselburgh.

== Career ==
According to Edward Pinnington's biography of Fraser, he was brought up at Dunoon on the coast of Argyll, and in an unfinished autobiography, he described his early passion for art:

"At an early age I evinced a taste for art, covering every scrap of paper I laid hands on (as indeed most children do) with drawings of horses and boats. When lost — a matter of frequent occurrence — I was usually found at a pit on the seashore, busily modelling in clay, often with a shell lying before me to copy from. Thus early had a taste to work from nature shewn itself."

His father's paints, oils, palettes and brushes were "the tools of childhood" and not surprisingly he resolved that "I will be a painter, and nothing else." About 1847, he went to Edinburgh and enrolled at the Trustees' Academy (which later became Edinburgh College of Art) under Thomas Duncan. From 1849 to 1853 he attended the life school of the Royal Scottish Academy. His first commission dates from about 1850.' In 1858 he was elected an associate of the Royal Scottish Academy and became an academician in 1862. He took up residence permanently in 1880 where he was doing his best work, most of it being done at the Royal Scottish Academy.

== Notable paintings ==
- Villagers by the River Valley (1845)
- Old Hermitage Road, Morningside, Edinburgh (1855)
- Undershot Mill, North Wales (c.1857; The Hunterian Museum and Art Gallery, University of Glasgow)
- Study for Bothwell Castle (The Hunterian Museum and Art Gallery, University of Glasgow)
- At Barncluith (1863; Royal Scottish Academy, Edinburgh)
- Sunset in October (1864)
- Haymaking on the Avon (National Gallery of Scotland, Edinburgh)
- Mary, Queen of Scots Bedroom, Holyroodhouse (Royal Collection)
- Welsh Cottage, Vale Of Conway (Kirkcaldy Museum and Art Gallery)
- Seven Sisters, Ben Cruachan
- Ruins in the Highlands (1870)
- A Rocky Coastline (1875)
- Eashing bridge, Surrey (1876)
- A picnic in the Highlands, with Loch Awe beyond (1884)
- Scottish Man signaling incoming boats on to a Highland Shore
