= Erskine Nicol =

Scottish painter (1825–1904)

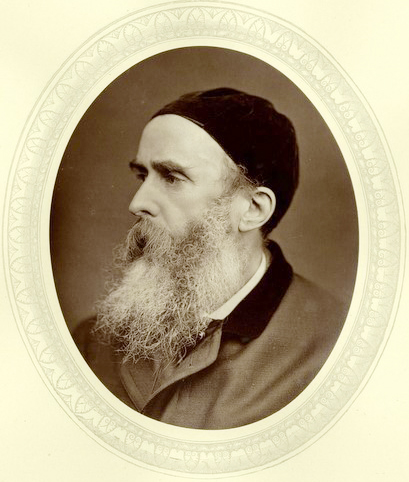
- Born: 3 July 1825
- Died: 8 March 1904 (aged 78)
- Education: William Allan
- Known for: oil painting

Erskine Nicol RSA ARA (3 July 1825 – 1904) was a Scottish figure and genre painter.

== Life ==
He was born in Leith on 3 July 1825 the eldest son of James Main Nicol and his wife Margaret Alexander. His father rented a property on Lochend Road and worked in a wine merchant (Wauchope & Moodie) at 133 Constitution Street. The family moved to Fife Place on Leith Walk in the 1830s.

After initial apprenticeship to a decorator he turned to art. He was a student at the Trustees' Academy on Picardy Place in Edinburgh, where he studied with Sir William Allan, and Thomas Duncan. On qualifying he initially taught as an Art Master at the old Leith High School.

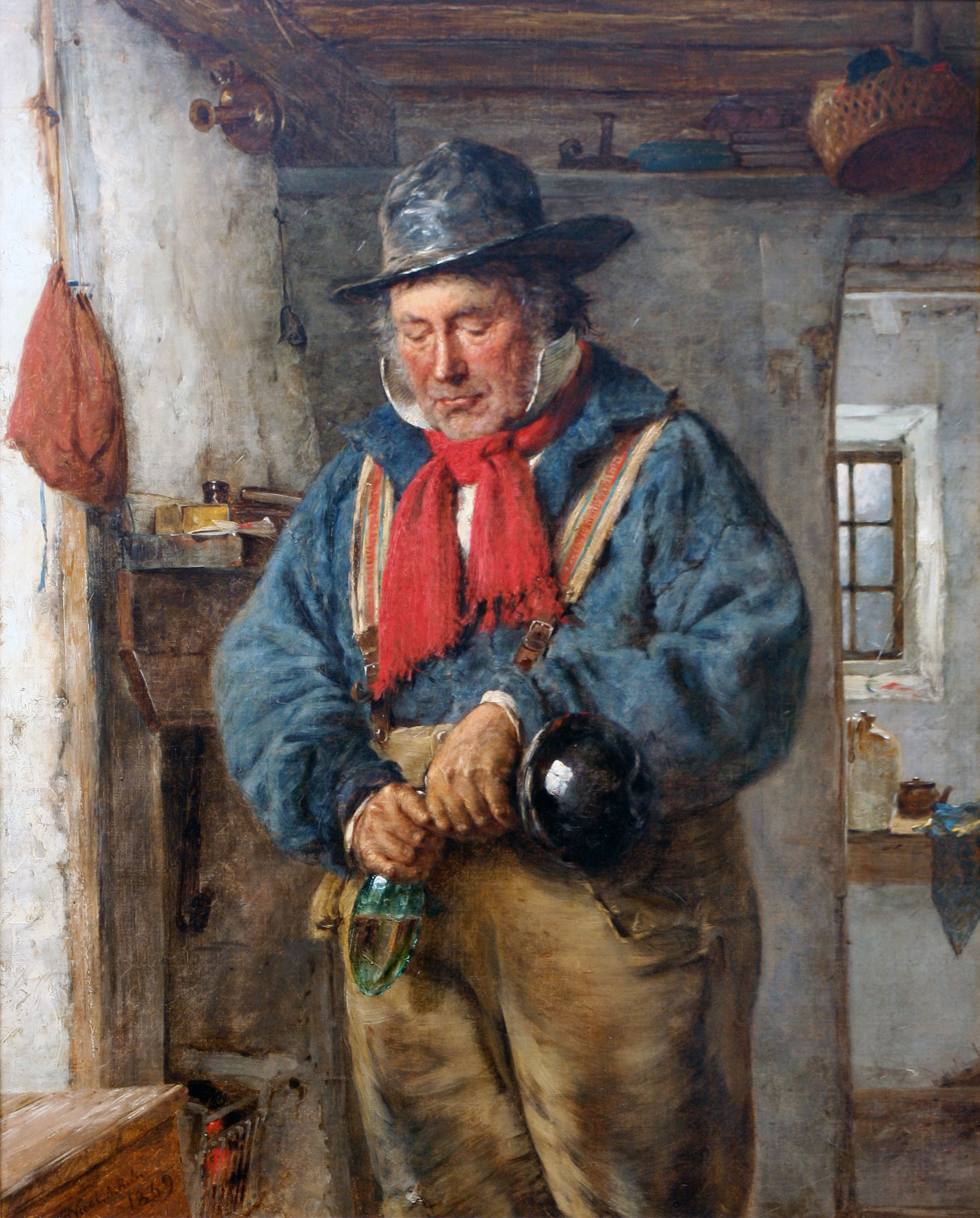
A Nip Against the Cold, 1869 – oil on canvasboard 20 × 25 in. / 51 × 64 cm.

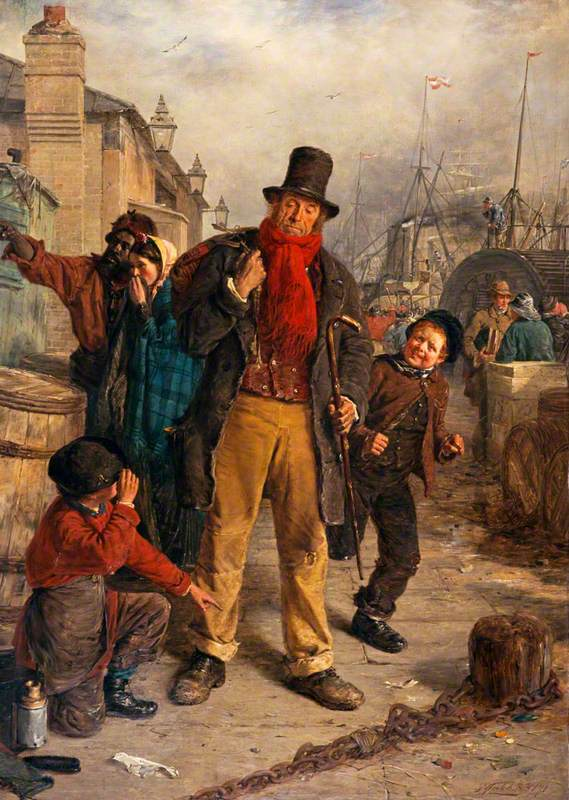
An Irish Emigrant Landing at Liverpool (Jim Blake Landing in Liverpool)

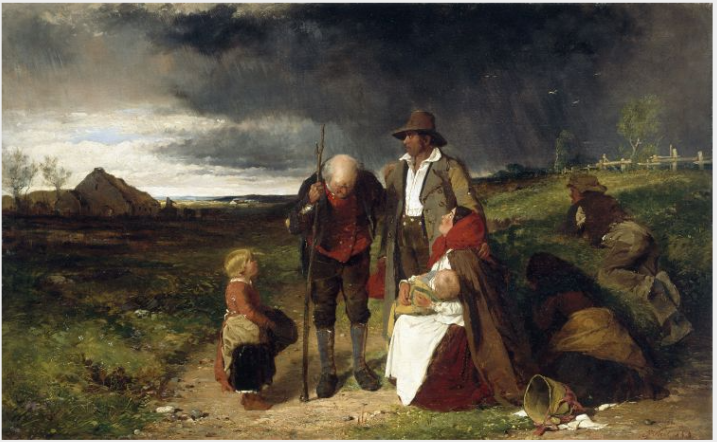
An Ejected Family – Irish folk evicted relating to the Irish famine

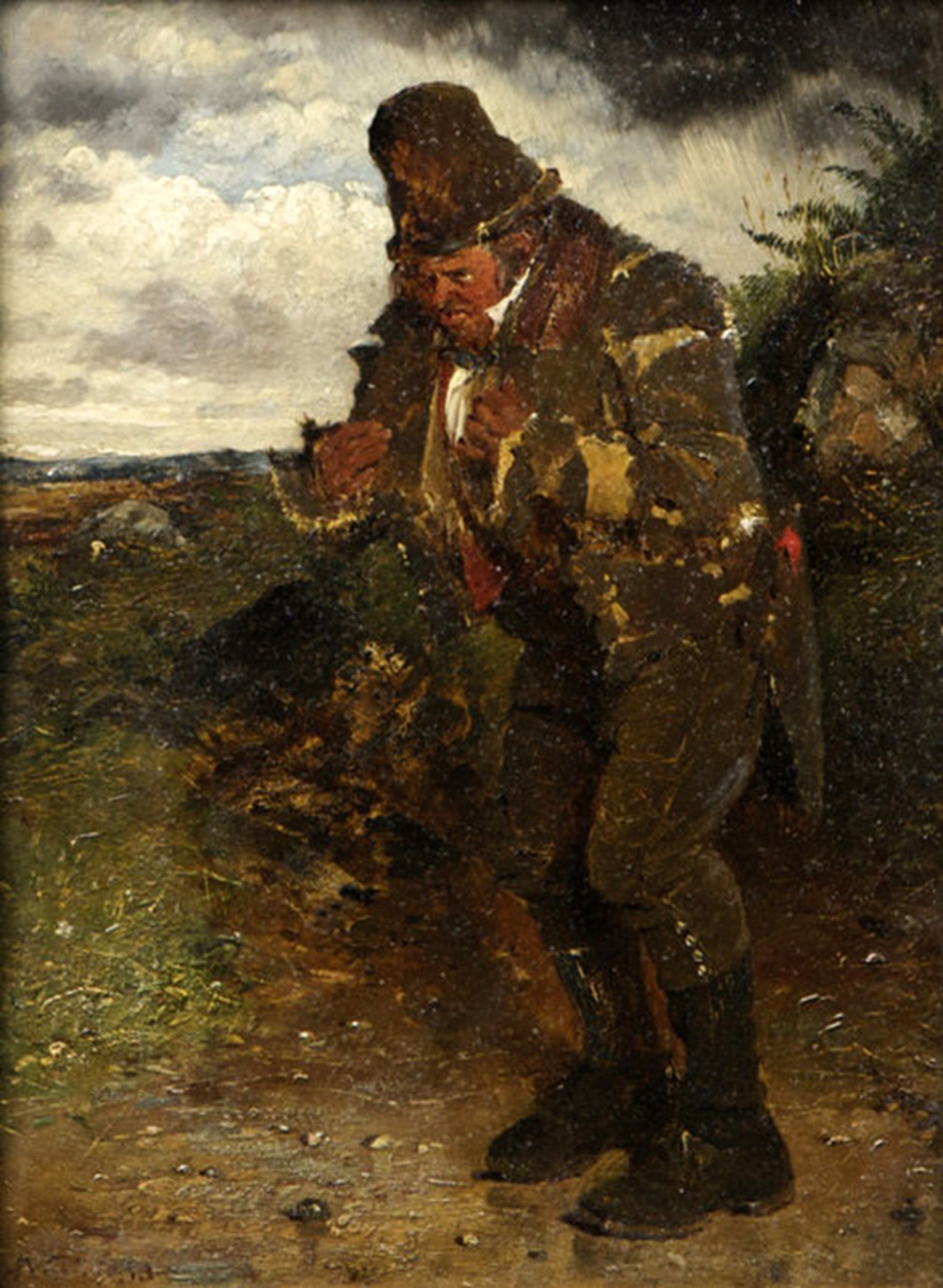
An Irish Countryman

Nicol taught in Dublin, Ireland, from 1845 to 1850, at the height of the Irish famine, and identified with the oppression of the Irish people and much of his work portrays the injustices inflicted upon the Irish population during the 19th century, As well as everyday Irish life.

In 1850, he moved back to Edinburgh. He lived at 1 Blenheim Place, a fine Georgian flat at the top of Leith Walk. He was made an associate of the Royal Scottish Academy in 1851 and an Academician in 1859.

Nicol exhibited at the Royal Academy and was made an associate of the Royal Academy in 1866. He also exhibited at the Royal Hibernian Academy and the British Institution.

In 1862 he left Edinburgh and moved to St John's Wood in London, then in 1864 moved to 24 Dawson Place in west London. He also purchased a studio in Clonava in County Westmeath in Ireland and enjoyed finishing canvases there until ill-health forced him to curtail his travelling. He thereafter used a disused church in Pitlochry to complete his works.

He died at The Dell, Feltham in Middlesex, on 8 March 1904. He is buried with his second wife in Rottingdean.

In 1905 the Royal Scottish Academy held a commemorative exhibition.

== Selected works ==
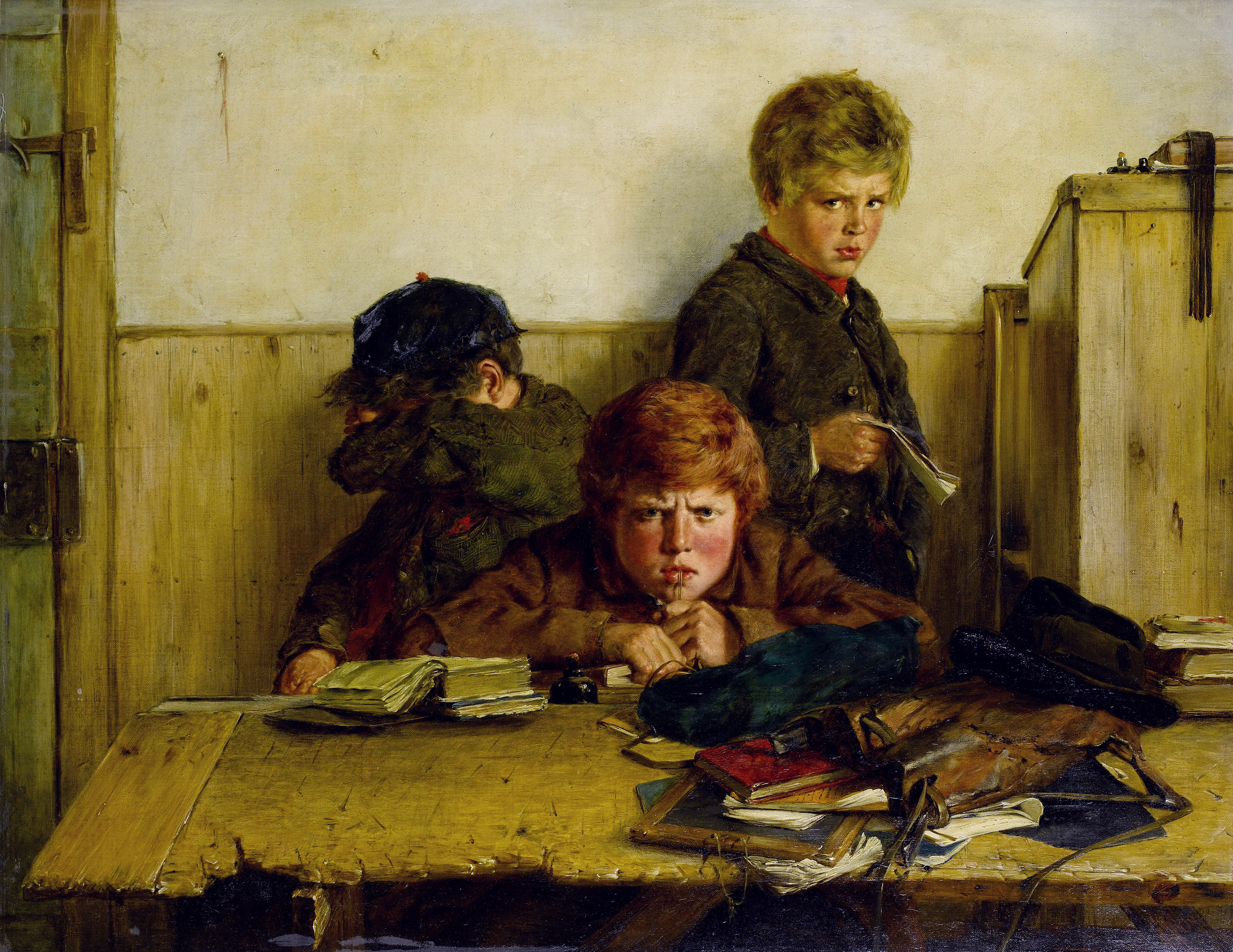
Kept In

- Wayside Prayers (1852; Tate, London)
- A Nip Against the Cold (1869)
- Beggar My Neighbour (1855)
- Irish Merry-Making (1856)
- Donnybrook Fair (1856)
- The Perch Fishers (1857)
- The Approach of the Enemy (1859)
- Portrait of Sir William Fettes Douglas (1862) Royal Scottish Academy
- Renewal of the Lease Refused (1863)
- Irish Emigrants Waiting for the Train (1864)
- The Emigrants (1864; Tate, London)
- A Deputation (1865)
- Collecting His Thoughts (1865) Sheffield Museums
- Both Puzzled (1866)
- A Country Booking-Office (1867)
- Making Pills for the Saxons (1868)
- The Crossroads (1868)
- Steady, Johnnie, Steady (1870)
- Kept In (1871)
- The Missing Boat (1877)

== Family ==
Nicol was married twice. His first marriage to Janet Watson lasted from 1851 until her death 1863, survived by a daughter and two sons, including the painter John Watson Nicol (1856–1926). He remarried in 1865 to Margaret Mary Wood, who survived him, with whom he had another daughter and two more sons. The elder of these was Erskine Edwin Nicol (1868–1926), also a painter and the father of the renowned paleoanthropologist Mary Leakey.
