= The Penny Wedding =

Painting by David Wilkie

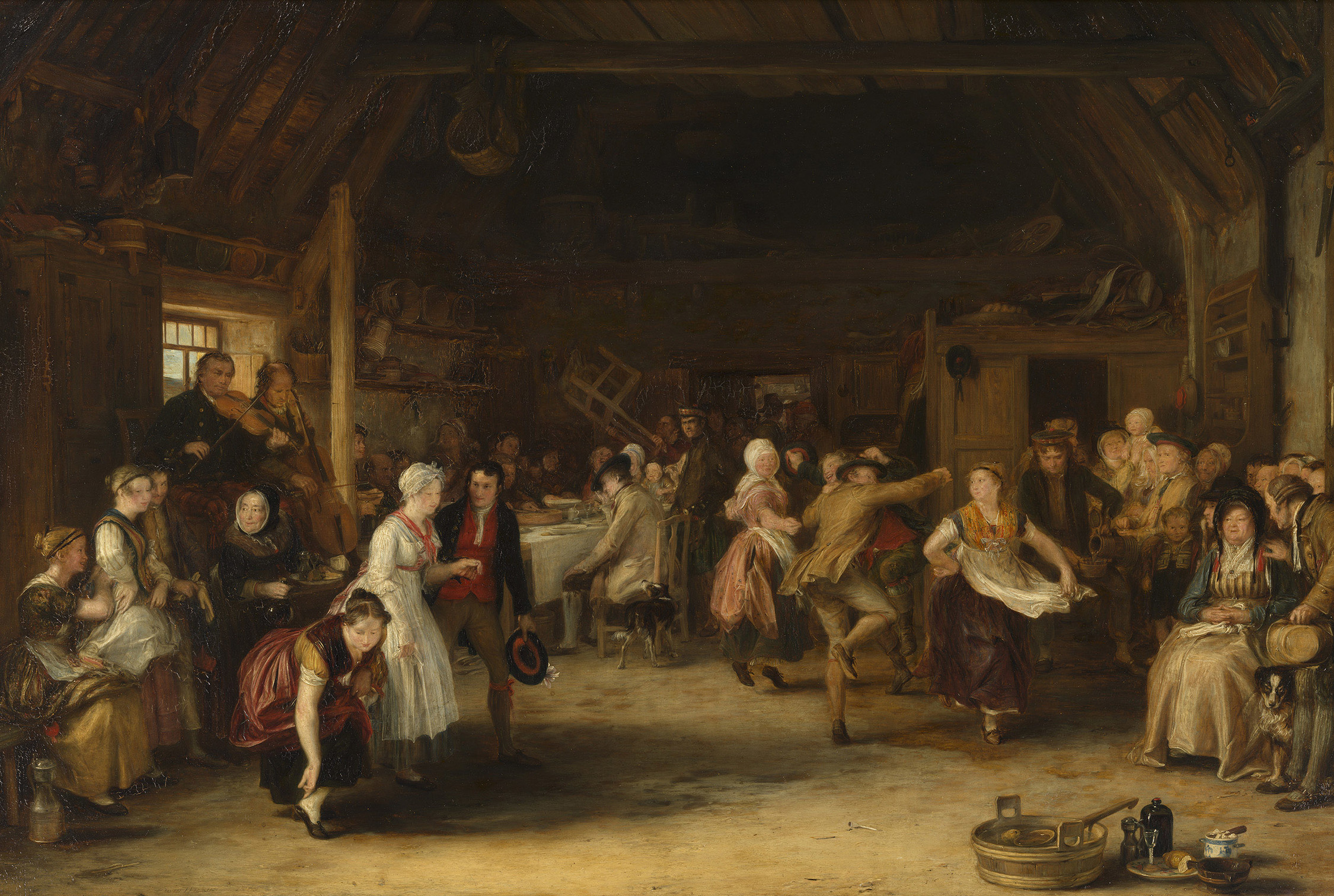
- Artist: David Wilkie
- Year: 1818
- Type: Oil on wood panel, genre painting
- Dimensions: 65 cm × 96 cm (25.6 in × 37.6 in)
- Location: Royal Collection

The Penny Wedding is an 1818 genre painting by the British artist David Wilkie. It depicts a traditional penny wedding in which the guests each paid a penny towards the cost.

Wilkie had toured the Scottish Highlands the previous year but the painting was intentionally vague in its geography. The participants are dressed in old-fashioned Lowland costume, suggesting it was set at least a generation earlier than it was painted possibly as much as fifty years by one estimate.

It was commissioned by the Prince Regent who wanted a companion piece for Blind-Man's Buff, an 1812 work by Wilkie which hung at Carlton House in London. Wilkie was paid 500 guineas for the work which was exhibited at the Royal Academy's 1819 Summer Exhibition at Somerset House. Today it remains in the Royal Collection.

== Bibliography ==
- Clarke, Deborah & Remington, Vanessa. Scottish Artists 1750-1900: From Caledonia to the Continent. Royal Collection Trust, 2015.
- Errington, Lindsay. Tribute to Wilkie: From the National Gallery of Scotland with Contributions by Turner, Landseer, Frith and Others. National Galleries of Scotland, 1985.
- Houston, R.A. Bride Ales and Penny Weddings: Recreations, Reciprocity, and Regions in Britain from the Sixteenth to the Nineteenth Centuries. Oxford University Press, 2014.
- Tromans, Nicholas. David Wilkie: The People's Painter. Edinburgh University Press, 2007.
