= The Blind Fiddler =

Painting by David Wilkie

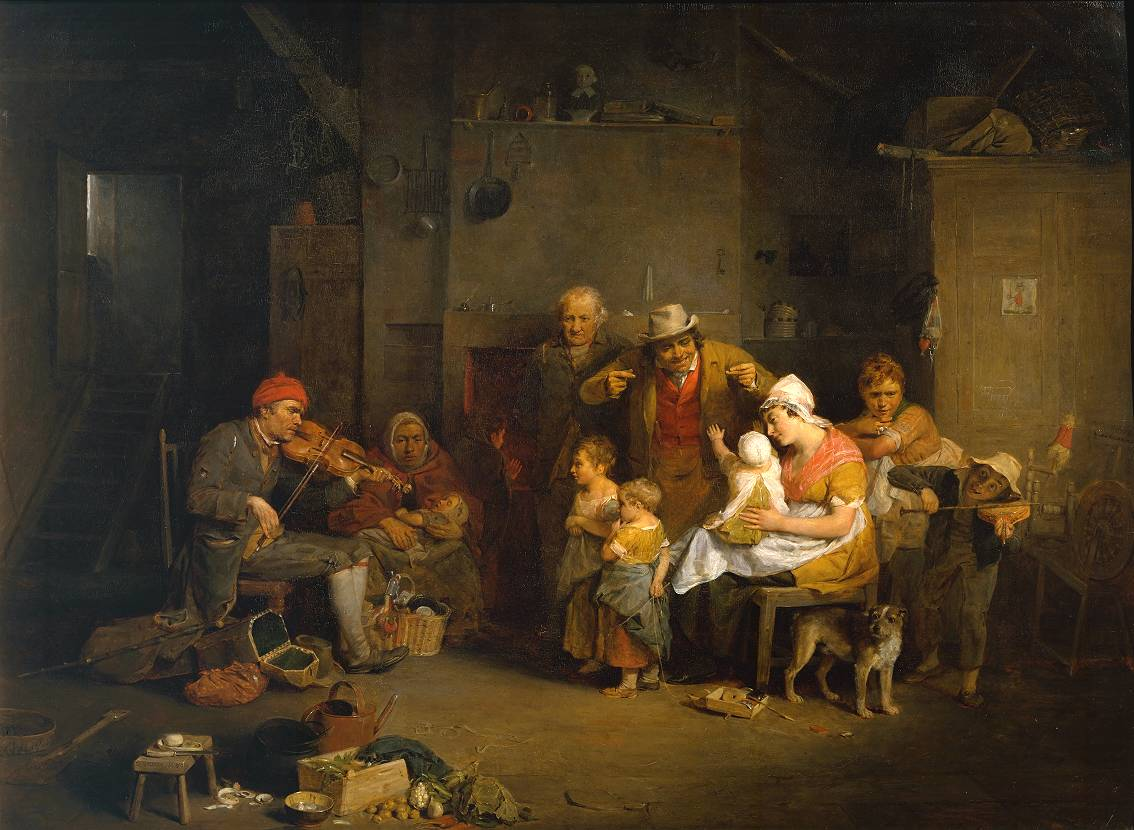
- Artist: David Wilkie
- Year: 1806
- Type: Oil on mahogany, genre painting
- Dimensions: 57.8 cm × 79.4 cm (22.8 in × 31.3 in)
- Location: Tate Britain, London

The Blind Fiddler is an 1806 genre painting by the Scottish artist David Wilkie. It was submitted to the Royal Academy's Summer Exhibition at Somerset House. Only the second painting Wilkie had publicly displayed, it confirmed his reputation as a rising star. Today the work is in the collection of the Tate Britain in London, having been gifted to the nation by the art collector Sir George Beaumont in 1826.

== Bibliography ==
- Bray, Joe. The Portrait in Fiction of the Romantic Period. Routledge, 2016.
- Prizel, Natalie. Victorian Ethical Optics: Innocent Eyes and Aberrant Bodies. Oxford University Press, 2024.
- Tromans, Nicholas. David Wilkie: The People's Painter. Edinburgh University Press, 2007.
