= Walter Geikie =

British artist (1795–1837)

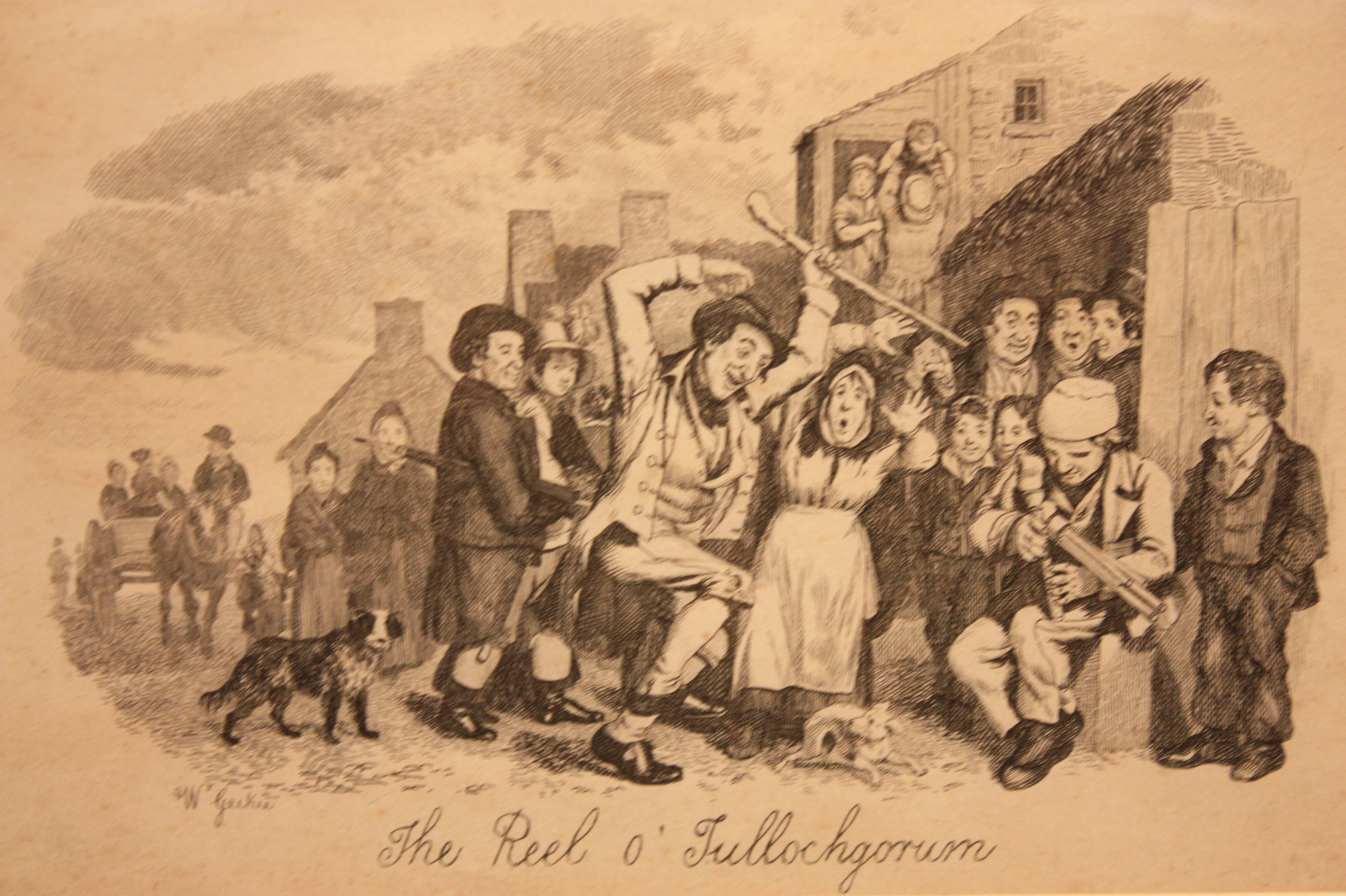
The Reel O' Tullochgorum by Walter Geikie

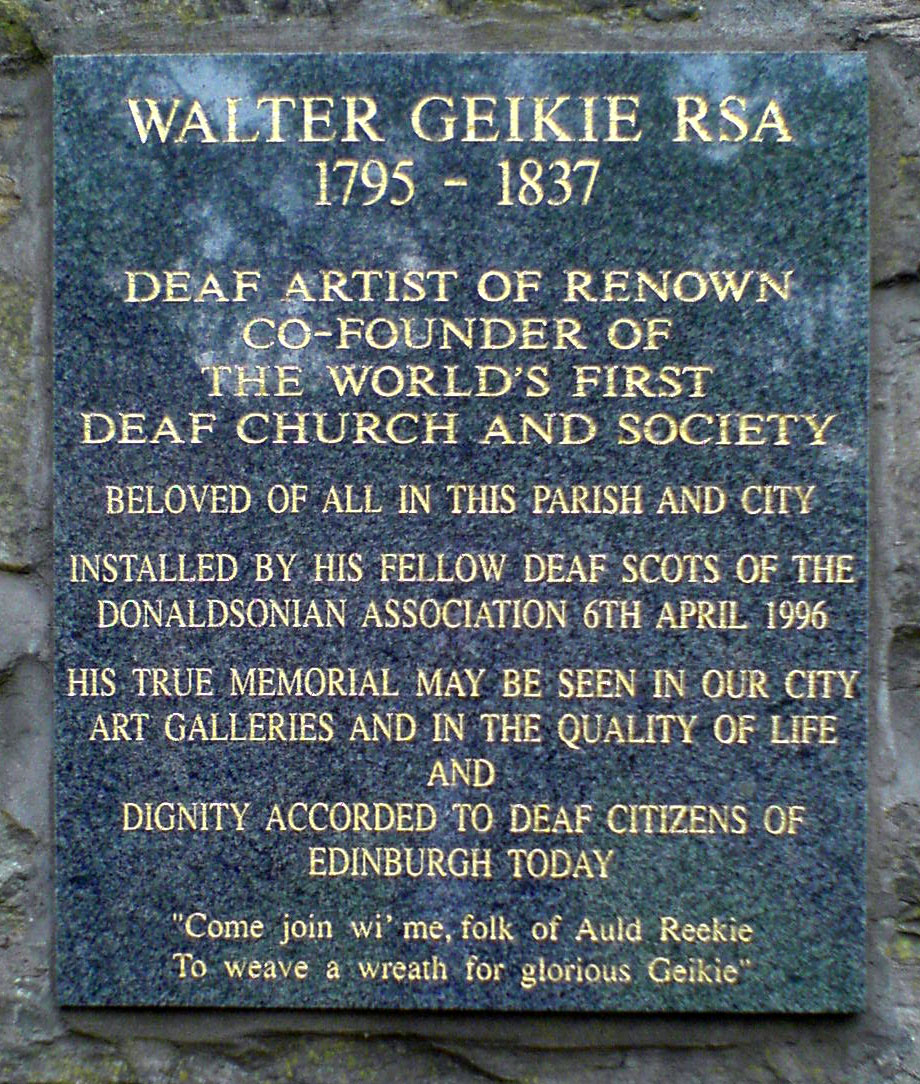
The memorial to Walter Geikie

Walter Geikie RSA (10 November 1795 – 1 August 1837) was a Scottish painter.

== Life ==
He was born in Edinburgh on 10 November 1795. At the age of two, he had a "nervous fever" which left him deaf. Through the careful attention of his father he obtained a good education. Before he had the advantage of the instruction of a master he had attained considerable proficiency in sketching both figures and landscapes from nature, and in 1812 he was admitted into the drawing academy of the board of Scottish manufactures. He first exhibited in 1815, and was elected an associate of the Royal Scottish Academy in 1831, and a fellow in 1834.

In the 1830s Walter was living with his father, Archibald Geikie, a hairdresser and perfumer, at 2 Drummond Street in the south side of the city.

Owing to his want of feeling for color, Geikie was not a successful painter in oils, but he sketched in India ink with great truth and humor the scenes and characters of Scottish lower-class life in his native city. A series of etchings which exhibit very high excellence were published by him in 1829-1831 and a collection of eighty-one of these was republished posthumously in 1841, with a biographical introduction by Sir Thomas Dick Lauder, Bart. Duncan Macmillan has described him as producing "images that are absolutely radical in their assertion of the inalienable nature of human dignity."

He died on 1 August 1837 and was buried in an unmarked grave in Greyfriars Kirkyard in Edinburgh, however a memorial was erected to his memory on the western boundary wall in 1996.
