= Chelsea Pensioners reading the Waterloo Dispatch =

1822 painting by Sir David Wilkie

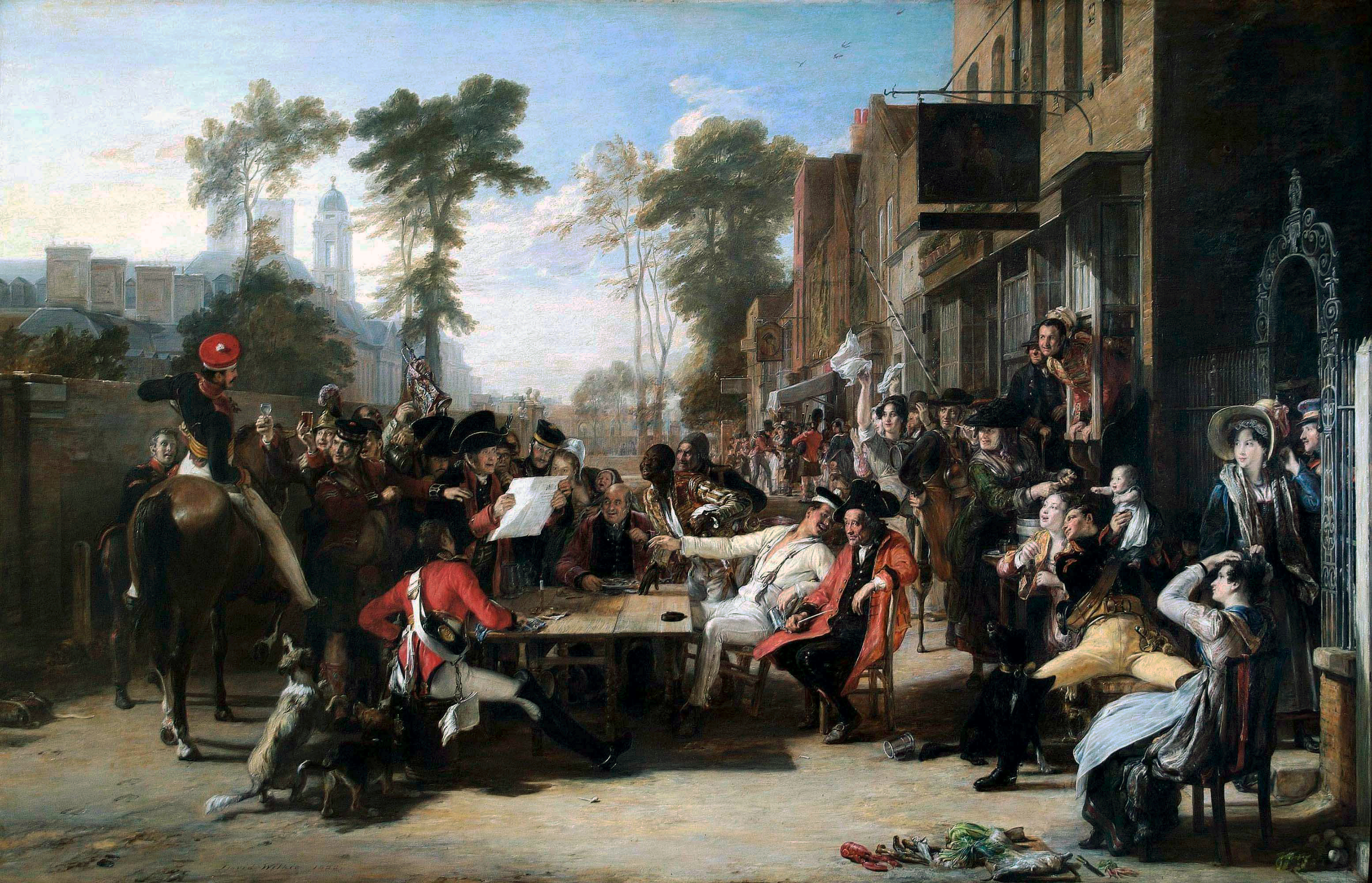
David Wilkie's painting The Chelsea Pensioners reading the Waterloo Dispatch, 158 × 97 centimetres (62 × 38 in).

The Chelsea Pensioners reading the Waterloo Dispatch, originally entitled Chelsea Pensioners Receiving the London Gazette Extraordinary of Thursday, June 22, 1815, Announcing the Battle of Waterloo, is an oil painting by David Wilkie, commissioned by Arthur Wellesley, 1st Duke of Wellington in August 1816.

It was exhibited at the Royal Academy Exhibition of 1822 at Somerset House, where it was so popular that a rail was installed to protect it from the thronging crowds. This was the first time that a rail was needed at the Royal Academy exhibition. The painting was retained by the Duke of Wellington and his descendants, it remains part of the Wellington Collection at Apsley House, but is now on loan to the National Gallery, London.

== Background ==
One of Wilkie's preparatory pen-and-ink sketches

Wellington was introduced to Wilkie by Thomas Graham, 1st Baron Lynedoch in August 1816, the year after the Battle of Waterloo. Wellington commissioned Wilkie, who intended to complete the work within two years. Willkie specialised in genre painting, but in this work he attempted to combine genre painting with history painting. The painting took the relatively novel approach of showing history in a contemporary setting, without adding references to ancient history or the Bible.

Wilkie prepared a sketch, but it was not viewed by the Duke until March 1819, when he asked for some changes to add more and younger soldiers. The work was not completed until 1822. After its successful first exhibition, Wilkie asked the Duke for an exceptionally large fee of 1,200 guineas.

== Description and characters ==
Printed key to the figures in the painting, based on Wilkie (transcription)

The painting measures 158 × 97 centimetres (62 × 38 in). It shows old soldiers gathered around a wooden table outside the "Duke of York" public house, in Jew's Row off the King's Road in Chelsea. The Royal Hospital Chelsea is visible in the background to the left.

One of the soldiers is reading The London Gazette, featuring the dispatch sent by the Duke of Wellington immediately after the Battle of Waterloo on 18 June 1815. The dispatch, dated 19 June 1815, was reprinted in several editions of the Gazette on 22 June 1815.

The painting includes many figures identified in notes prepared by Wilkie, including, from left to right:

- An artilleryman who has laid down his knapsack.
- A mounted orderly of the 7th Light Dragoons who has brought the Gazette, wearing a blue uniform with red pillbox hat.
- A soldier from the Life Guards, a sergeant from 42nd Foot (the Black Watch) who fought at the Battle of Barrosa in 1811, and one from the King's German Legion.
- A Chelsea pensioner who was at the Battle of Quebec with General Wolfe in 1759, standing and reading the Gazette.
- A soldier's wife, pregnant and ashen-faced, waiting for news of her husband's fate.
- A seated veteran eating an oyster (despite the consumption of oysters in June being prohibited by Act of Parliament).
- A black bandsman from the 1st Foot Guards (once a servant of General Moreau) who witnessed the execution of Louis XVI in 1793.
- An old soldier who fought under Wellington at the Battle of Assaye in 1803, and under the Marquis of Granby in the Seven Years' War in the 1750s and 1760s.
- A veteran with a wooden leg.
- An Irishman from the 11th Dragoons, talking to an elderly veteran, who served with General Eliott in the Great Siege of Gibraltar.
- A corporal from the Royal Horse Guards (the Blues) with his wife and son and the dog Old Duke which accompanied the regiment through Spain.
- A soldier from the Foot Guards leaning out from the window.

In the background, a Highlander is playing the bagpipes.

== Reception ==
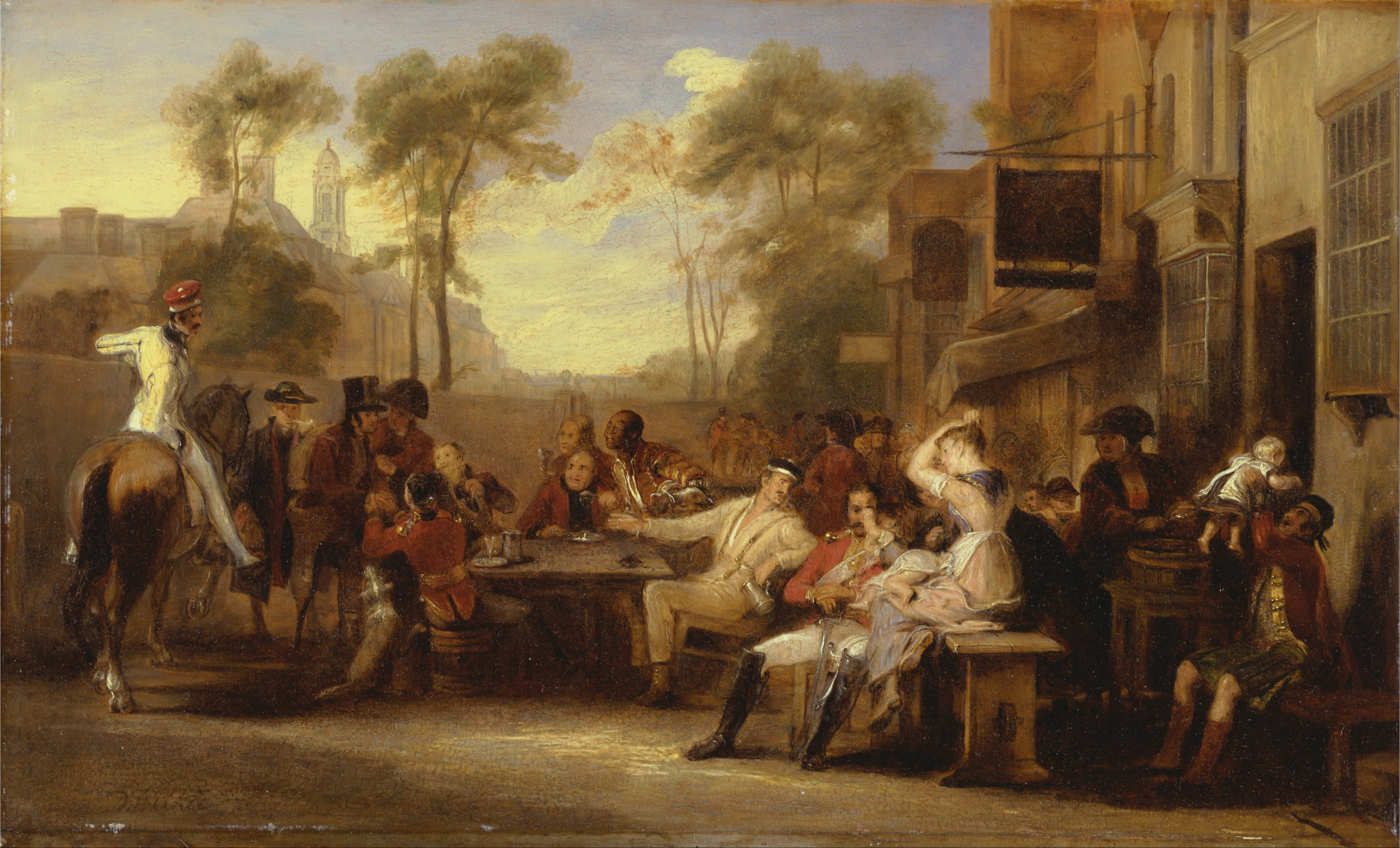
An oil sketch version at the Yale Center for British Art.

The painting's focus on ordinary people made a significant impression on Théodore Géricault when he viewed the unfinished work in Wilkie's studio in the spring of 1821, and on its second showing at the Royal Institution. It was also seen by Eugène Delacroix and Richard Parkes Bonington.

The painting was given a prominent, central position at the Royal Academy summer exhibition at Somerset House in 1822, hanging over the fireplace beside a portrait of the Duke of Wellington by Sir Thomas Lawrence. It became so popular that a rail was installed to protect it from the crowds, the first time that this precaution had been needed at a Royal Academy exhibition (the next occasion was for William Powell Frith's The Derby Day in 1858).

Wilkie received his commission of 1,200 guineas from Wellington, and he was paid a further 1,200 guineas by the publishers Graves & Co for the right to reproduce the painting as a print, engraved by John Burnet in 1829. The publisher also commissioned a watercolour copy, sold at Sotheby's in London on 14 April 1994.

Wilkie's preparatory drawings show the evolution of the group. There are also several oil sketches, including one at the Yale Center for British Art, c.1819.

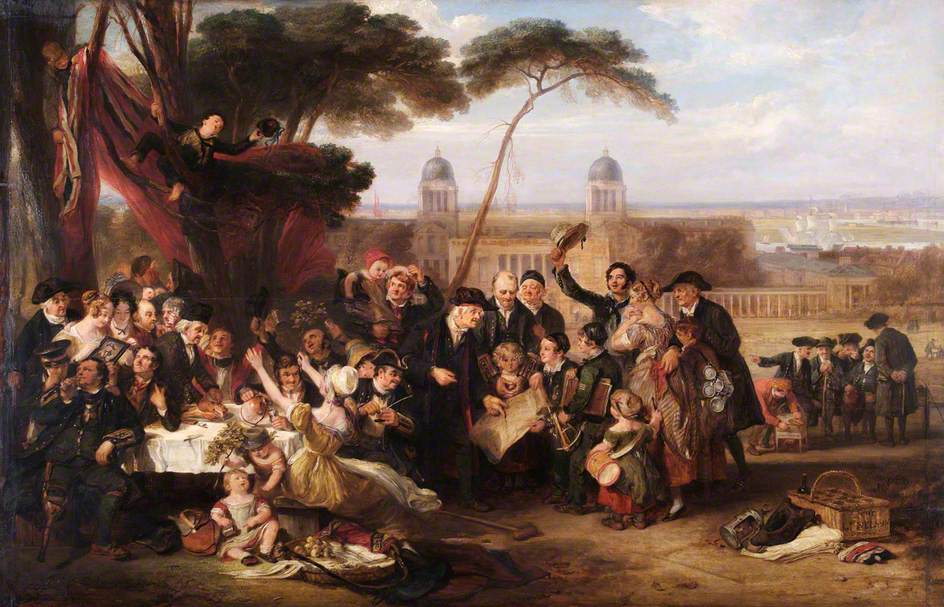
Greenwich Pensioners Commemorating Trafalgar by John Burnet, 1837

In 1837 John Burnet exhibited an intended companion painting Greenwich Pensioners Commemorating Trafalgar at the British Institution. It was purchased by Wellington for Apsley House for 500 guineas.

== See also ==
- Chelsea Pensioner
