= Greenwich Hospital Act =

Stock short title used for UK legislation

Greenwich Hospital Act is a stock short title used in the United Kingdom for legislation relating to the Greenwich Hospital charity.

== List ==
- The Greenwich Hospital, etc. Act 1695 (7 & 8 Will. 3. c. 21)
- The Greenwich Hospital, etc. Act 1696 (8 & 9 Will. 3. c. 23)

Greenwich Hospital, etc. Act 1711
- Act of Parliament
- Parliament of Great Britain
- Long title: An Act for better collecting and recovering the Duties granted for the Support of the Royal Hospital at Greenwich; and for the further Benefit thereof; and for preserving Her Majesty's Harbour Moorings.
- Citation: 10 Ann. c. 27 (Note: This is the citation in The Statutes of the Realm.); 10 Ann. c. 17 (Note: This is the citation in The Statutes at Large.)
- Territorial extent: Great Britain

Dates
- Royal assent: 22 May 1712
- Commencement: 7 December 1711 (Note: Start of session.)
- Repealed: 31 December 1834
Other legislation
Repealed by	Greenwich Hospital Act 1834

Status: Repealed

Text of statute as originally enacted

- 10 Ann. c. 27 is sometimes referred to as the Greenwich Hospital, etc. Act 1711
- The Greenwich Hospital Act 1728 (2 Geo. 2. c. 7)
- The Greenwich Hospital Act 1776 (16 Geo. 3. c. 24)
- The Greenwich Hospital Act 1806 (46 Geo. 3. c. 100)
- The Greenwich Hospital Act 1807 (47 Geo. 3 Sess. 1. c. 52)
- The Greenwich Hospital Act 1814 (54 Geo. 3. c. 110)
- The Greenwich Hospital Act 1815 (55 Geo. 3. c. 56)
- The Greenwich Hospital Out-pensioners Act 1821 (1 & 2 Geo. 4. c. 98)
- The Greenwich Hospital Act 1826 (7 Geo. 4. c. 35)

Greenwich Hospital Act 1829
- Act of Parliament
- Parliament of the United Kingdom
- Long title: An Act to provide for the better Management of the Affairs of Greenwich Hospital.
- Citation: 10 Geo. 4. c. 25
- Territorial extent: United Kingdom

Dates
- Royal assent: 22 May 1829
- Commencement: 22 May 1829 (Note: Section 1.)
- Repealed: 13 March 1975
Other legislation
Amends	Greenwich Hospital Act 1776
Amended by	Naval Prize Acts Repeal Act 1864; Greenwich Hospital Act 1865
Repealed by	Statute Law (Repeals) Act 1975
Relates to	Greenwich Hospital Outpensions, etc. Act 1829

Status: Repealed

Text of statute as originally enacted

- The Greenwich Hospital Act 1829 (10 Geo. 4. c. 25)

Greenwich Hospital Outpensions, etc. Act 1829
- Act of Parliament
- Parliament of the United Kingdom
- Long title: An Act for transferring the Management of Greenwich Out-Pensions, and certain Duties in Matters of Prize, to the Treasurer of the Navy.
- Citation: 10 Geo. 4. c. 26
- Territorial extent: United Kingdom

Dates
- Royal assent: 1 June 1829
- Commencement: 1 June 1829
- Repealed: 16 July 1874
Other legislation
Amends	Naval Officers' Half Pay Act 1816; Naval Prize Money, etc. Act 1818
Repeals/revokes	Greenwich Out-Pensioners Act 1763; Chest at Chatham Act 1803; Greenwich Hospital Act 1806; Chest of Greenwich Act 1806; Greenwich Hospital Act 1807; Royal Naval Asylum Act 1811; Greenwich Hospital Act 1814; Pensions to Seamen, etc. Act 1814; Greenwich Hospital Act 1815; Chelsea and Greenwich Hospitals Act 1815; Royal Naval Asylum Act 1817; Greenwich Hospital Out-pensioners Act 1821; Royal Naval Asylum, etc. Act 1825; Greenwich Hospital Act 1826
Amended by	Post Office (Repeal of Laws) Act 1837; Admiralty, &c. Acts Repeal Act 1865
Repealed by	Statute Law Revision Act 1874
Relates to	Greenwich Hospital Act 1829

Status: Repealed

Text of statute as originally enacted

- The Greenwich Hospital Outpensions, etc. Act 1829 (10 Geo. 4. c. 26)

Greenwich Hospital Act 1834
- Act of Parliament
- Parliament of the United Kingdom
- Long title: An Act to repeal the Laws relating to the Contribution out of Merchant Seamen's Wages towards the Support of the Royal Naval Hospital at Greenwich, and for supplying other Funds in lieu thereof.
- Citation: 4 & 5 Will. 4. c. 34
- Territorial extent: United Kingdom; Isle of Man

Dates
- Royal assent: 25 July 1834
- Commencement: 31 December 1834 (Note: The Acts of Parliament (Commencement) Act 1793.)
- Repealed: United Kingdom: 30 September 1869; Isle of Man: 25 July 1991
Other legislation
Amends	Piracy Act 1721; Forfeited Estates (Greenwich Hospital) Act 1734; Merchant Seamen Act 1762; Admiralty Act 1832
Repeals/revokes	Greenwich Hospital, etc. Act 1695; Greenwich Hospital, etc. Act 1696; Greenwich Hospital, etc. Act 1711; Greenwich Hospital Act 1728; Greenwich Hospital Act 1744
Repealed by	United Kingdom: Greenwich Hospital Act 1869; Isle of Man: Statute Law Revision (Isle of Man) Act 1991

Status: Repealed

Text of statute as originally enacted

- The Greenwich Hospital Act 1834 (4 & 5 Will. 4. c. 34)

Greenwich Hospital Act 1850
- Act of Parliament
- Parliament of the United Kingdom
- Long title: An Act to enable the Commissioners of Greenwich Hospital to improve the said Hospital, and also to enlarge and improve the Billingsgate Dock, and widen Billingsgate Street, in Greenwich; and for other Purposes.
- Citation: 13 & 14 Vict. c. 24
- Territorial extent: United Kingdom

Dates
- Royal assent: 25 June 1850
- Commencement: 25 June 1850

Status: Amended

Text of statute as originally enacted

- 13 & 14 Vict. c. 24 is sometimes referred to as the Greenwich Hospital Act 1850 or the Greenwich Hospital Improvement Act 1850.

Greenwich Hospital (Provision for Widows) Act 1863 (Note: Section 4.)
- Act of Parliament
- Parliament of the United Kingdom
- Long title: An Act to enable Provision to be made out of the Funds of Greenwich Hospital for the Widows of Seamen and Marines slain, killed, or drowned in the Sea Service of the Crown.
- Citation: 26 & 27 Vict. c. 67
- Territorial extent: United Kingdom

Dates
- Royal assent: 21 July 1863
- Commencement: 21 July 1863
- Repealed: 30 September 1865
Other legislation
Repealed by	Greenwich Hospital Act 1865

Status: Repealed

Text of statute as originally enacted

- The Greenwich Hospital (Provision for Widows) Act 1863 (26 & 27 Vict. c. 67)

Greenwich Hospital Act 1865
- Act of Parliament
- Parliament of the United Kingdom
- Long title: An Act to provide for the better Government of Greenwich Hospital, and the more beneficial Application of the Revenues thereof.
- Citation: 28 & 29 Vict. c. 89
- Territorial extent: United Kingdom

Dates
- Royal assent: 5 July 1865
- Commencement: 30 September 1865 (Note: Section 2.)
Other legislation
Amends	Greenwich Hospital Act 1829
Repeals/revokes	Greenwich Hospital (Provision for Widows) Act 1863
Amended by	Greenwich Hospital Act 1869; Greenwich Hospital Act 1870; Greenwich Hospital Act 1872; Statute Law Revision Act 1875; Greenwich Hospital Act 1885; Naval Knights of Windsor (Dissolution) Act 1892; Statute Law Revision Act 1893; Greenwich Hospital Act 1898; Greenwich Hospital Act 1942; War Damage Act 1943; Charities Act 1960; Defence (Transfer of Functions) (No. 1) Order 1964; Greenwich Hospital Act 1967; Armed Forces Act 1971; Statute Law (Repeals) Act 1973; Statute Law (Repeals) Act 1975; Statute Law (Repeals) Act 1976; Armed Forces Act 1981; Statute Law (Repeals) Act 1986; Civil Partnership Act 2004

Status: Partially repealed

Text of statute as originally enacted

Revised text of statute as amended

Text of the Greenwich Hospital Act 1865 as in force today (including any amendments) within the United Kingdom, from legislation.gov.uk.

- The Greenwich Hospital Act 1865 (28 & 29 Vict. c. 89)

Greenwich Hospital Act 1869
- Act of Parliament
- Parliament of the United Kingdom
- Long title: An Act to make better provision respecting Greenwich Hospital, and the application of the revenues thereof.
- Citation: 32 & 33 Vict. c. 44
- Territorial extent: United Kingdom

Dates
- Royal assent: 2 August 1869
- Commencement: 30 September 1869
Other legislation
Amends	Greenwich Hospital Act 1865
Repeals/revokes	Greenwich Hospital Act 1834
Amended by	Statute Law Revision Act 1883; Greenwich Hospital Act 1885; Naval Knights of Windsor (Dissolution) Act 1892; Statute Law Revision (No. 2) Act 1893; Greenwich Hospital Act 1898; Greenwich Hospital Act 1947; Statute Law Revision Act 1950; Defence (Transfer of Functions) (No. 1) Order 1964; Miscellaneous Financial Provisions Act 1983; Armed Forces Act 1996

Status: Partially repealed

Text of statute as originally enacted

Revised text of statute as amended

Text of the Greenwich Hospital Act 1869 as in force today (including any amendments) within the United Kingdom, from legislation.gov.uk.

- The Greenwich Hospital Act 1869 (32 & 33 Vict. c. 44)

Greenwich Hospital Act 1870
- Act of Parliament
- Parliament of the United Kingdom
- Long title: An Act to amend the Law relating to the repayment to the Consolidated Fund of money expended for the benefit of Greenwich Hospital.
- Citation: 33 & 34 Vict. c. 100
- Territorial extent: United Kingdom

Dates
- Royal assent: 10 August 1870
- Commencement: 10 August 1870
- Repealed: 31 July 1885
Other legislation
Amends	Greenwich Hospital Act 1865
Repealed by	Greenwich Hospital Act 1885

Status: Repealed

Text of statute as originally enacted

- The Greenwich Hospital Act 1870 (33 & 34 Vict. c. 100)

Greenwich Hospital Act 1872
- Act of Parliament
- Parliament of the United Kingdom
- Long title: An Act for making further provision respecting the application of the Revenues of Greenwich Hospital.
- Citation: 35 & 36 Vict. c. 67
- Territorial extent: United Kingdom

Dates
- Royal assent: 10 August 1872
- Commencement: 10 August 1872
Other legislation
Amends	Government Annuities Act 1853; Government Annuities Act 1864; Greenwich Hospital Act 1865
Amended by	Greenwich Hospital Act 1885; Greenwich Hospital Act 1921; Greenwich Hospital Act 1947; Statute Law Revision Act 1953; Statute Law Revision Act 1963

Status: Partially repealed

Text of statute as originally enacted

Revised text of statute as amended

Text of the Greenwich Hospital Act 1872 as in force today (including any amendments) within the United Kingdom, from legislation.gov.uk.

- The Greenwich Hospital Act 1872 (35 & 36 Vict. c. 67)

Greenwich Hospital Act 1883
- Act of Parliament
- Parliament of the United Kingdom
- Long title: An Act to make further provision respecting the application of the Revenues of Greenwich Hospital, and for other purposes.
- Citation: 46 & 47 Vict. c. 32
- Territorial extent: United Kingdom

Dates
- Royal assent: 20 August 1883
- Commencement: 20 August 1883
Other legislation
Amended by	Greenwich Hospital Act 1885; Statute Law Revision Act 1898; Greenwich Hospital Act 1898; Greenwich Hospital Act 1947; Defence (Transfer of Functions) (No. 1) Order 1964; Civil Partnership Act 2004; Statute Law (Repeals) Act 2008

Status: Partially repealed

Text of statute as originally enacted

Revised text of statute as amended

Text of the Greenwich Hospital Act 1883 as in force today (including any amendments) within the United Kingdom, from legislation.gov.uk.

- The Greenwich Hospital Act 1883 (46 & 47 Vict. c. 32)

Greenwich Hospital Act 1885
- Act of Parliament
- Parliament of the United Kingdom
- Long title: An Act to provide for defraying the Expenditure on account of Greenwich Hospital directly out of the Revenues of Greenwich Hospital; to amend in other respects the Greenwich Hospital Acts, 1865 to 1883; and to amend the law relating to the Naval Knights of Windsor.
- Citation: 48 & 49 Vict. c. 42
- Territorial extent: United Kingdom

Dates
- Royal assent: 31 July 1885
- Commencement: 31 July 1885
Other legislation
Amends	Military and Naval Knights of Windsor Act 1861; Greenwich Hospital Act 1865; Naval Knights of Windsor Act 1867; Greenwich Hospital Act 1869; Greenwich Hospital Act 1872; Greenwich Hospital Act 1883
Repeals/revokes	Greenwich Hospital Act 1870
Amended by	{{ubliNaval Knights of Windsor (Dissolution) Act 1892|Statute Law Revision Act 1898|Defence (Transfer of Functions) (No. 1) Order 1964|Greenwich Hospital Act 1967|Armed Forces Act 1981}}

Status: Partially repealed

Text of statute as originally enacted

Revised text of statute as amended

Text of the Greenwich Hospital Act 1885 as in force today (including any amendments) within the United Kingdom, from legislation.gov.uk.

- The Greenwich Hospital Act 1885 (48 & 49 Vict. c. 42)

Naval Knights of Windsor (Dissolution) Act 1892 (Note: Section 4.)
- Act of Parliament
- Parliament of the United Kingdom
- Long title: An Act for dissolving the Corporation styled the Naval Knights of Windsor of the foundation of Samuel Travers, Esquire, and for regulating the application of the property thereof, and for applying and amending the Greenwich Hospital Acts.
- Citation: 55 & 56 Vict. c. 34
- Territorial extent: United Kingdom

Dates
- Royal assent: 27 June 1892
- Commencement: 27 June 1892 (Note: Section 1(1).)
- Repealed: 1 July 1977 (Note: The Armed Forces Act 1976 (Commencement) Order 1977 (SI 1977/897).)
Other legislation
Amends	Greenwich Hospital Act 1869; Greenwich Hospital Act 1885
Repeals/revokes	Military and Naval Knights of Windsor Act 1861; Naval Knights of Windsor Act 1867
Amended by	Statute Law Revision Act 1950
Repealed by	Armed Forces Act 1976

Status: Repealed

Text of statute as originally enacted

- The Naval Knights of Windsor (Dissolution) Act 1892 (55 & 56 Vict. c. 34)

Greenwich Hospital Act 1898 (Note: Section 6.)
- Act of Parliament
- Parliament of the United Kingdom
- Long title: An Act to amend the Greenwich Hospital Acts, 1865 to 1892.
- Citation: 61 & 62 Vict. c. 24
- Territorial extent: United Kingdom

Dates
- Royal assent: 25 July 1898
- Commencement: 25 July 1898
- Repealed: England and Wales and Scotland: 13 April 1976
Other legislation
Amends	Greenwich Hospital Act 1865; Greenwich Hospital Act 1869; Greenwich Hospital Act 1883
Amended by	Greenwich Hospital Act 1947; Charities Act 1960
Repealed by	England and Wales and Scotland: Statute Law (Repeals) Act 1976

Status: Repealed

Text of statute as originally enacted

- The Greenwich Hospital Act 1898 (61 & 62 Vict. c. 24)

Greenwich Hospital Act 1921
- Act of Parliament
- Parliament of the United Kingdom
- Long title: An Act to amend the Greenwich Hospital Act, 1872.
- Citation: 11 & 12 Geo. 5. c. 41
- Territorial extent: United Kingdom

Dates
- Royal assent: 17 August 1921
- Commencement: 17 August 1921
- Repealed: 23 May 1950
Other legislation
Amends	Greenwich Hospital Act 1872
Repealed by	Statute Law Revision Act 1950

Status: Repealed

Text of statute as originally enacted

- The Greenwich Hospital Act 1921 (11 & 12 Geo. 5. c. 41)

Greenwich Hospital (Disused Burial Ground) Act 1925
- Act of Parliament
- Parliament of the United Kingdom
- Long title: An Act to authorise buildings to be erected on a disused burial ground forming part of Greenwich Hospital.
- Citation: 15 & 16 Geo. 5. c. 58
- Territorial extent: United Kingdom

Dates
- Royal assent: 7 August 1925
- Commencement: 7 August 1925
- Repealed: 8 November 1995
Other legislation
Repealed by	Statute Law (Repeals) Act 1995

Status: Repealed

Text of statute as originally enacted

- The Greenwich Hospital (Disused Burial Ground) Act 1925 (15 & 16 Geo. 5. c. 58)

Greenwich Hospital Act 1942 (Note: Section 3.)
- Act of Parliament
- Parliament of the United Kingdom
- Long title: An Act to extend the powers of the Admiralty under section twenty of the Greenwich Hospital Act, 1865, with respect to the grant and allocation of pensions and pecuniary benefits in the case of persons employed for the purposes of Greenwich Hospital and otherwise to amend the said section; to provide, on the death of any such persons, for the distribution without probate or other proof of title of sums not exceeding one hundred pounds due to those persons or to their legal personal representatives; and for purposes connected with the matters aforesaid.
- Citation: 5 & 6 Geo. 6. c. 35
- Territorial extent: United Kingdom

Dates
- Royal assent: 22 October 1942
- Commencement: 22 October 1942
Other legislation
Amends	Greenwich Hospital Act 1865
Amended by	Administration of Estates (Small Payments) Act 1965; Civil Partnership Act 2004; Statute Law (Repeals) Act 2008

Status: Amended

Text of statute as originally enacted

Revised text of statute as amended

Text of the Greenwich Hospital Act 1942 as in force today (including any amendments) within the United Kingdom, from legislation.gov.uk.

- The Greenwich Hospital Act 1942 (5 & 6 Geo. 6. c. 35)

Greenwich Hospital Act 1947 (Note: Section 3(1).)
- Act of Parliament
- Parliament of the United Kingdom
- Long title: An Act to repeal certain restrictions on the amount of special Greenwich Hospital pensions and of expenditure out of Greenwich Hospital Funds for the education and maintenance of children, and to make further provision for the granting out of those Funds of widows' pensions, children's allowances and gratuities to dependants.
- Citation: 10 & 11 Geo. 6. c. 5
- Territorial extent: United Kingdom

Dates
- Royal assent: 18 February 1947
- Commencement: 18 February 1947
- Repealed: 21 July 2008
Other legislation
Amends	Greenwich Hospital Act 1869; Greenwich Hospital Act 1872; Greenwich Hospital Act 1883; Greenwich Hospital Act 1898; Pensions (Increase) Act 1920; Pensions (Increase) Act 1944
Amended by	Statute Law Revision Act 1950; Statute Law Revision Act 1953; Civil Partnership Act 2004
Repealed by	Statute Law (Repeals) Act 2008

Status: Repealed

Text of statute as originally enacted

Revised text of statute as amended

Text of the Greenwich Hospital Act 1947 as in force today (including any amendments) within the United Kingdom, from legislation.gov.uk.

- The Greenwich Hospital Act 1947 (10 & 11 Geo. 6. c. 5)

Greenwich Hospital Act 1967
- Act of Parliament
- Parliament of the United Kingdom
- Long title: An Act to amend the enactments relating to Greenwich Hospital in respect of the investment of capital money and the annual estimates of income and expenditure.
- Citation: 1967 c. 74
- Territorial extent: United Kingdom

Dates
- Royal assent: 27 July 1967
- Commencement: 27 July 1967
Other legislation
Amends	Greenwich Hospital Act 1865; Greenwich Hospital Act 1885
Amended by	Statute Law (Repeals) Act 2008

Status: Partially repealed

Text of statute as originally enacted

Revised text of statute as amended

Text of the Greenwich Hospital Act 1967 as in force today (including any amendments) within the United Kingdom, from legislation.gov.uk.

- The Greenwich Hospital Act 1967 (c. 74)

Greenwich Hospital Act 1990 (Note: Section 2(1).)
- Act of Parliament
- Parliament of the United Kingdom
- Long title: An Act to enable the Royal Hospital School to admit both girls and boys and, in either case, regardless of any seafaring family connection; and for purposes connected therewith.
- Citation: 1990 c. 13
- Territorial extent: United Kingdom

Dates
- Royal assent: 29 June 1990
- Commencement: 29 June 1990

Status: Current legislation

Text of statute as originally enacted

Revised text of statute as amended

Text of the Greenwich Hospital Act 1990 as in force today (including any amendments) within the United Kingdom, from legislation.gov.uk.

- The Greenwich Hospital Act 1990 (c. 13)

=== Collective titles ===
The Greenwich Hospital Acts 1865 to 1870 was the collective title of the Greenwich Hospital Acts 1865 and 1869 and the Greenwich Hospital Act 1870.

The Greenwich Hospital Acts 1865 to 1872 was the collective title of the Greenwich Hospital Acts 1865 to 1870 and the Greenwich Hospital Act 1872.

The Greenwich Hospital Acts 1865 to 1892 was originally the collective title of the Greenwich Hospital Acts 1865, 1869, 1872, 1883, 1885 and the Naval Knights of Windsor (Dissolution) Act 1892. Section 6 of the Greenwich Hospital Act 1898 provided that that Act could be cited with the Greenwich Hospital Acts 1865 to 1892.

The Greenwich Hospital Acts 1865 to 1921 was the collective title of the Greenwich Hospital Acts 1865 to 1898 and the Greenwich Hospital Act 1921.

The Greenwich Hospital Acts 1865 to 1942 is the collective title of the Greenwich Hospital Acts 1865 to 1921 and the Greenwich Hospital Act 1942.

The Greenwich Hospital Acts 1865 to 1947 is the collective title of the Greenwich Hospital Acts 1865 to 1942 and the Greenwich Hospital Act 1947.

The Greenwich Hospital Acts 1865 to 1967 is the collective title of the Greenwich Hospital Acts 1865 to 1947 and the Greenwich Hospital Act 1967.

The Greenwich Hospital Acts 1865 to 1990 is the collective title of the Greenwich Hospital Acts 1865 to 1967 and the Greenwich Hospital Act 1990.

== See also ==
- List of short titles
