= Chatham Chest =

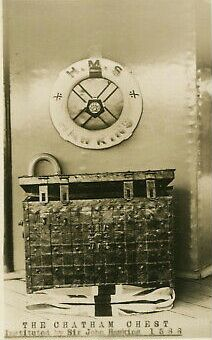
The original Chatham Chest, in the National Maritime Museum

The Chatham Chest was a fund set up in 1588 to pay pensions to disabled seamen from the Royal Navy. It was financed by regular deductions from seamen's pay, which were deposited in a chest held at Chatham Dockyard and disbursed upon proof of a sailor's disability. The fund ceased operation in 1803 when it was merged with an equivalent pension scheme run by Greenwich Hospital. The actual Chatham Chest has since been displayed at the National Maritime Museum in London and at the Mast House at Chatham Historic Dockyard.

== Origin ==
Originally conceived as a charity, the Chatham Chest was established after seamen who had been disabled in the war against Spain petitioned Queen Elizabeth for relief and maintenance. Credit for its founding may belong to Charles Howard, the Lord High Admiral of England, who promoted the concept at court.

The chest itself was a strong iron box with five locks, located at Chatham Dockyard under the protection of the Chatham Division of the Royal Marines. Keys for the chest were held by five separate officials to reduce the risk of individual embezzlement.

== Payments and rates ==
Payments into the chest were made as compulsory deductions from the pay of each Royal Navy seaman. From 1594 to 1649, deductions were set at 1/30 of a seaman's wages, equivalent in 1626 to a sixpence from the monthly pay of fifteen shillings. In 1649 the standard seaman's wage was increased to nineteen shillings and a differential deduction introduced, of sixpence a month for ordinary seamen, eight pence for surgeons and ten pence for chaplains.

Pensions were granted on a fixed scale, ranging from £6.13s.4d per annum for the loss of a limb to £15 per annum for the loss of both arms. In addition each pensioner was granted an immediate lump sum, generally equal to one year's pension, called "smart money".

== Difficulties ==
During its long life the chest experienced many difficulties. Until the late 18th century, and particularly before 1660, seamen's wages were often significantly less than the official rates while payments to the chest remained fixed. As a consequence many seamen were required to contribute amounts exceeding 1/20 of their pay. Despite the mechanism of five separate officials being required to open the chest, large quantities of funds went missing. Further, in the early 1620s King Charles I simply appropriated the chest's contents for payment of unrelated debts.

By 1660 the number of pensioners had increased during the First Dutch War and the war against Spain, but when peace returned and the ships were paid off, the chest's income dramatically decreased. The first expedient adopted was to offer pensioners voluntary commutation of their pensions, based on two years' purchase, but still the chest found it difficult to pay the remaining pensions. Samuel Pepys, Clerk of the Acts to the Navy Board, took a great interest in the affairs of the chest and reported in his diary (18 June 1667) that there was no money to pay the pensioners "at their public pay the 14th of this month, which will make us a scorn to the world." Treasury funds were obtained and taken down the Thames by barge to Chatham, and the immediate crisis was staved off.

From about 1673 onwards it was tacitly accepted that the government would meet the excess of expenditure over income each year on a "pay as you go" basis. This principle remained in force, though sometimes the government was late in paying and pensions fell into arrears. In 1690 some pensions were as much as three years outstanding. The chest also experienced a substantial increase in the number of pensioners during the Napoleonic Wars, rising to 5,205 in 1802.

== Merger ==
Chest at Chatham Act 1803
- Act of Parliament
- Parliament of the United Kingdom
- Long title: An act for improving the Funds of the Chest at Chatham, and for transferring the Administration of the same to Greenwich Hospital; and for ameliorating the Condition of the Pensioners on the said Funds.
- Citation: 43 Geo. 3. c. 119
- Territorial extent: United Kingdom

Dates
- Royal assent: 29 July 1803
- Commencement: 29 July 1803 (Note: Section 1.)
- Repealed: 1 June 1829

Other legislation
- Amended by: Chest of Greenwich Act 1806; Post Office (Repeal of Laws) Act 1837
- Repealed by: Greenwich Hospital Outpensions, etc. Act 1829

Status: Repealed

Text of statute as originally enacted

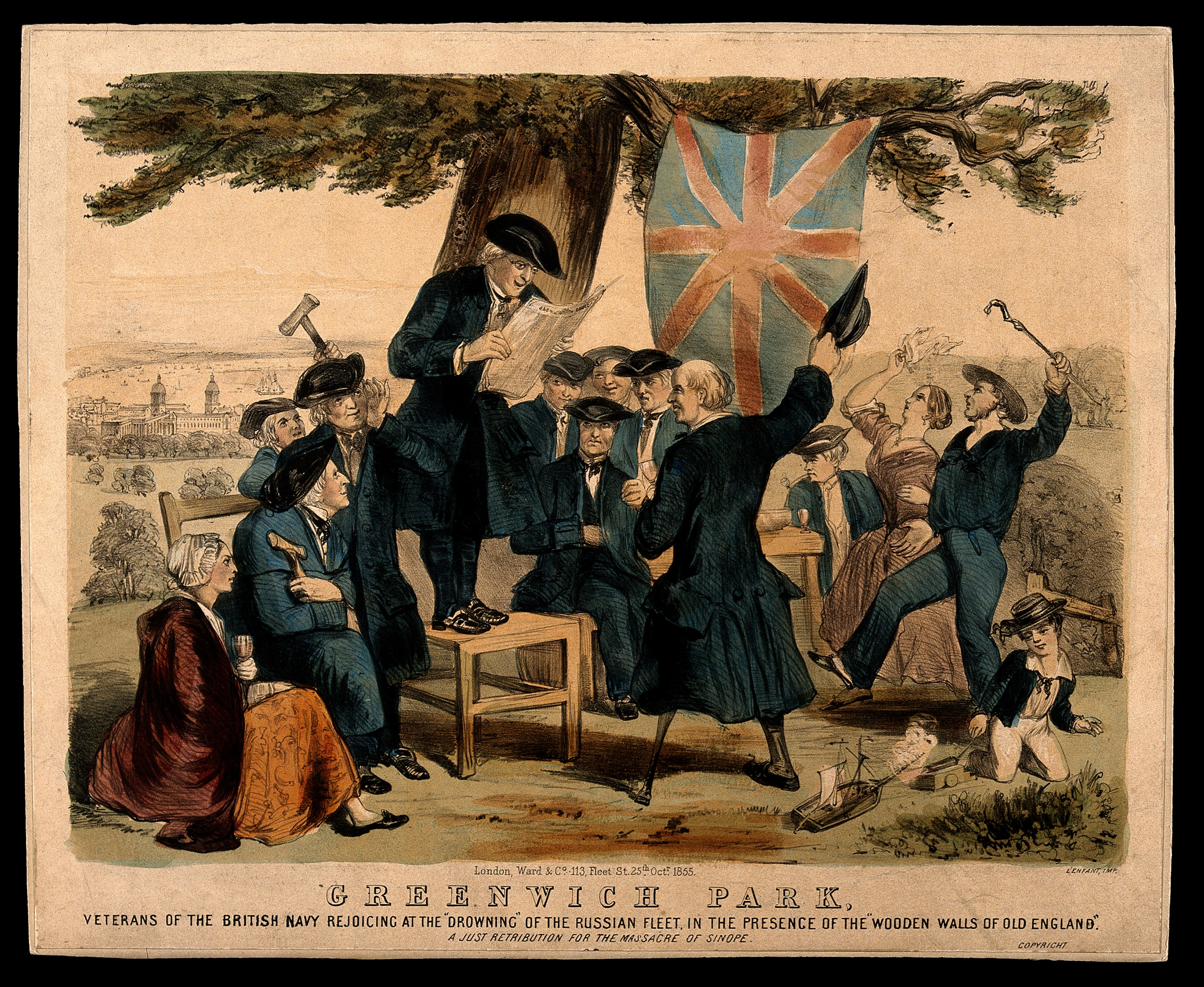
Royal Navy pensioners, Greenwich Hospital. Lithograph by John Burnet, 1855

Following an act of Parliament, the Chest at Chatham Act 1803 (43 Geo. 3. c. 119), the functions of the chest were merged with the welfare programmes of Greenwich Hospital. The merger was completed in 1814, and the physical chest was removed from use. It was subsequently displayed at London's National Maritime Museum, and at The Mast House in Chatham Historic Dockyard.

== Bibliography ==
- Sainsbury, Anthony (2001). The Royal Navy Day by Day. National Maritime Museum. ISBN 9780711021235.
- Kemp, Peter (1970). The British Sailor: A Social History of the Lower Deck. JM Dent & Sons. ISBN 0460039571.
- Lewin, C.G. (2003). Pensions and Insurance before 1800 - a social history. Tuckwell Press. ISBN 9781862322110.
