= Drawing room =

Room in a house where visitors may be entertained

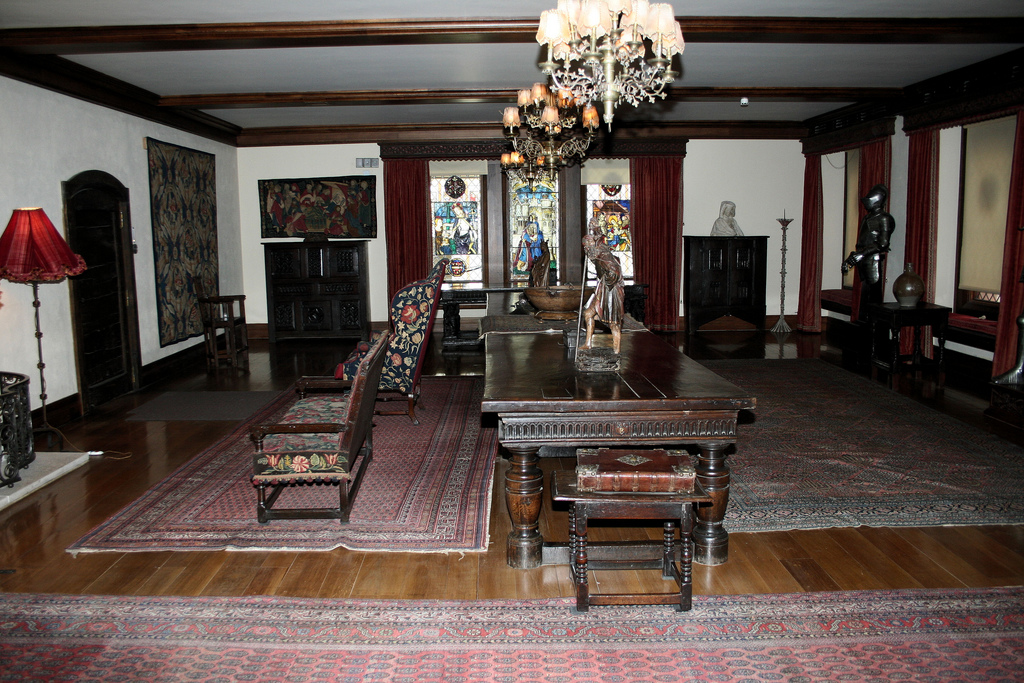
Reconstructed drawing room of Sir William Burrell; part of the Burrell Collection in Glasgow, Scotland

A drawing room is a room in a house where visitors may be entertained, and an alternative name for a living room. The name is derived from the 16th-century terms withdrawing room and withdrawing chamber, which remained in use until the mid 1600s. The term "drawing room" made its first written appearance in 1642. In a large 16th- to early 18th-century English house, a withdrawing room was a room to which the owner of the house, his wife, or a distinguished guest who was occupying one of the main apartments in the house could "withdraw" for more privacy. It was often off the great chamber (or the great chamber's descendant, the state room) and usually led to a formal, or "state" bedroom.

In modern houses, the term may be used as a convenient name for a second or further reception room, but no particular function is associated with the name.

== History and development ==
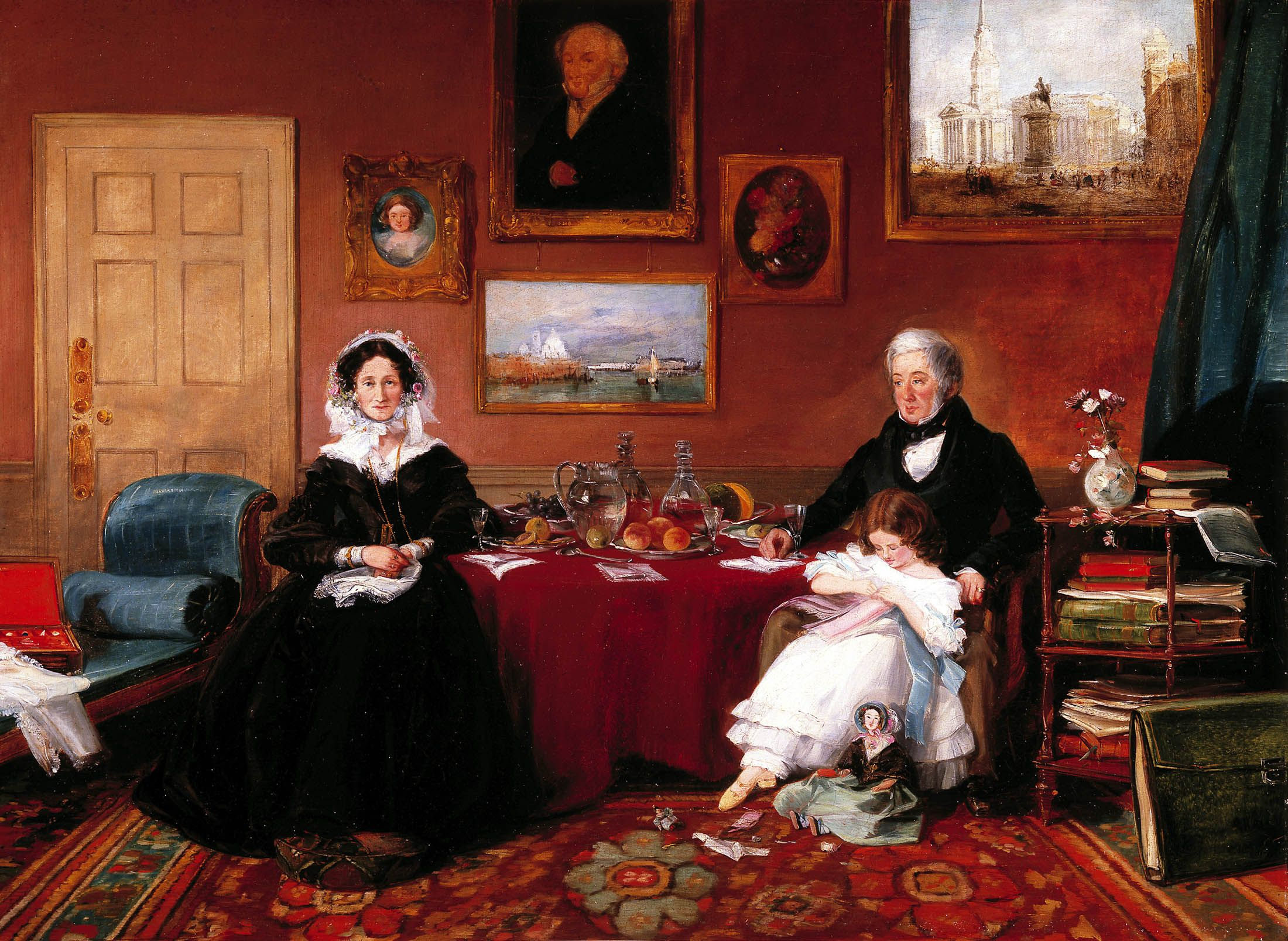
Middle-class drawing room in Blackheath, London, 1841, painted by James Holland

In 18th-century and 19th century London, the royal morning receptions that the French called levées were called "drawing rooms", with the sense originally that the privileged members of court would gather in the drawing room outside the king's bedroom, where he would make his first formal public appearance of the day. Later they developed into large, very formal, daytime parties.

During the American Civil War, in the White House of the Confederacy in Richmond, Virginia, the drawing room was off the parlor where CSA President Jefferson Davis greeted his guests. At the conclusion of these greetings, the men remained in the parlor to talk politics and the women withdrew to the drawing room for their own conversation. This was common practice in the affluent circles of the Southern United States.

In 1865, an architectural manual in England defined "drawing room" in this way:

This is the Lady's Apartment, essentially, being the modern form of the Lady's Withdrawing-room, otherwise the Parlour, or perfected Chamber of mediaeval plan. If a Morning-room be not provided, it is properly the only Sitting-room of the family. In it in any case the ladies receive calls throughout the day, and the family and their guests assemble before dinner. After dinner the ladies withdraw to it, and are joined by the gentlemen for the evening. It is also the reception room for evening parties. There is only one kind of drawing room as regards purpose: there is little difference, except in size and evidence of opulence, between that of the duchess and that of the simplest gentlewoman in the neighborhood. ... In size, a small drawing room will be about 16 feet wide by from 18 to 20 feet long: 18 by 24 feet is a good size: 20 by 30 to 26 by 40 is enough for a very superior apartment.

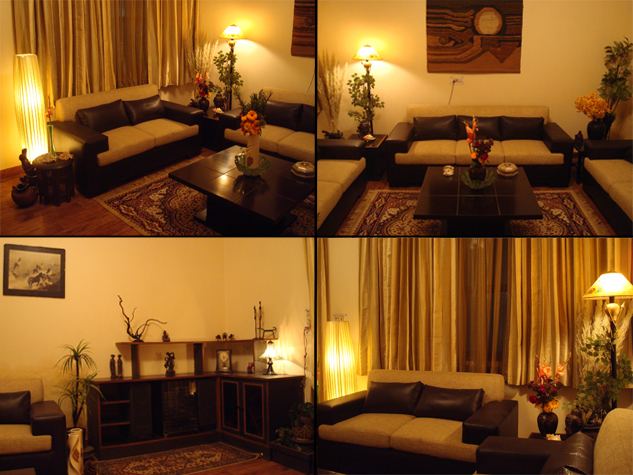
An Indian drawing room

Until the mid-twentieth century, after a dinner the ladies of a dinner party withdrew to the drawing room, leaving the gentlemen at table, where the tablecloth was removed. After an interval of conversation, often accompanied by brandy or port and sometimes cigars, the gentlemen rejoined the ladies in the drawing room.

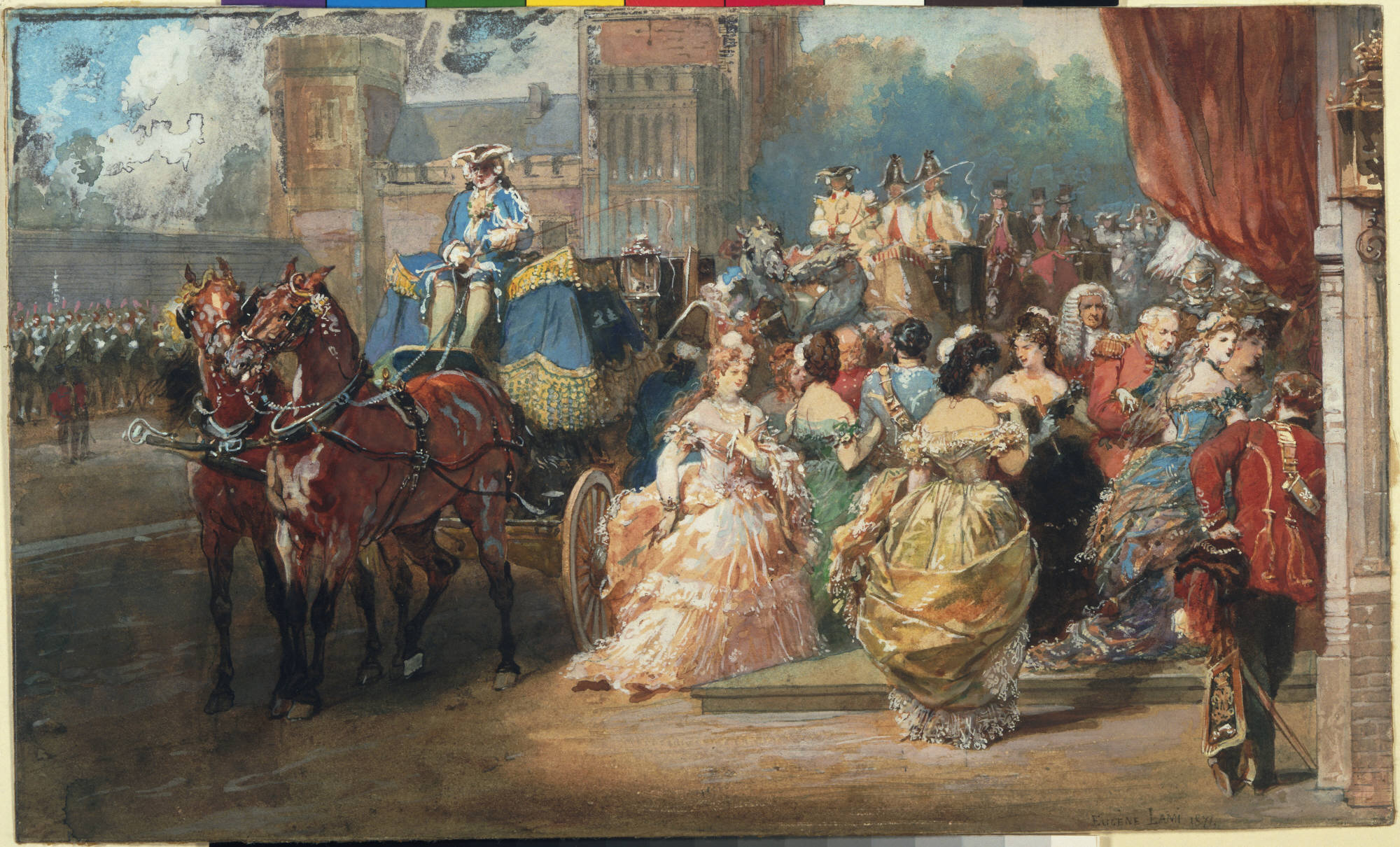
Entry to a Drawing Room at Marlborough House, 1871, watercolour by Eugène Lami. A party given by Edward VII when Prince of Wales

The term drawing room is not used as widely as it once was, and tends to be used in Britain only by those who also have other reception rooms, such as a morning room, a 19th-century designation for a sitting room, often with east-facing exposure, suited for daytime calls, or the middle-class lounge, a late-19th-century designation for a room in which to relax. Hence the drawing room is the smartest room in the house, usually used by the adults of the family when entertaining. This term is widely used in India and Pakistan, probably dating from the colonial days, in the larger urban houses of the cities where there are many rooms.

The term parlour initially designated the more modest reception rooms of the middle classes, but usage changed in the UK as homeowners sought to identify with the grander homes of the wealthy. Parlor remained the common usage in North America into the early 20th century. In French usage the word salon, previously designating a state room, began to be used for a drawing room in the early part of the 19th century, reflecting the salon social gatherings that had become popular in the preceding decades.

== Railway usage ==
The term drawing room was historically also applied to certain passenger train accommodations, designating some of the most spacious and expensive private accommodations available on board a sleeping car or private railroad car. An example, named as such, was a Midland Railway "Drawing Room Car" in 1874 that was made by Pullman and imported from the United States.

In North America, it meant a room in which slept three or more persons, with a private washroom. Although Amtrak has retired its sleeping cars that were built with drawing rooms, they are still used by Via Rail Canada. The traditional nomenclature is seen as archaic, hence they are marketed as "triple bedrooms".

== Drawing room plays ==
The drawing room, being a room in the house to entertain visitors, gave its name to drawing room plays, a genre of theatrical productions and motion pictures. Beginning with the early forms of drama, the drawing room play has evolved to encompass comedy as well as to include the forms of the dramatic monologue. The play format itself has also grown out of the traditional drawing room performance and back into main street theater and film. While the drawing room itself has fallen out of favor, the play format has continued to provide a source of entertainment.

Drawing room comedy typically features wit and verbal banter among wealthy, leisured, genteel, upper class characters. Drawing room comedy is also sometimes called the "comedy of manners". Oscar Wilde's 1895 The Importance of Being Earnest and several of the plays of Noël Coward are typical works of the genre. George Bernard Shaw's 1919 Heartbreak House adds an undercurrent of social criticism to the genre. Cary Grant appeared in a number of filmed drawing-room comedies. Ernst Lubitsch was especially known as a director of drawing room comedies.
