= Trafalgar Day =

Annual celebration held on 21 October

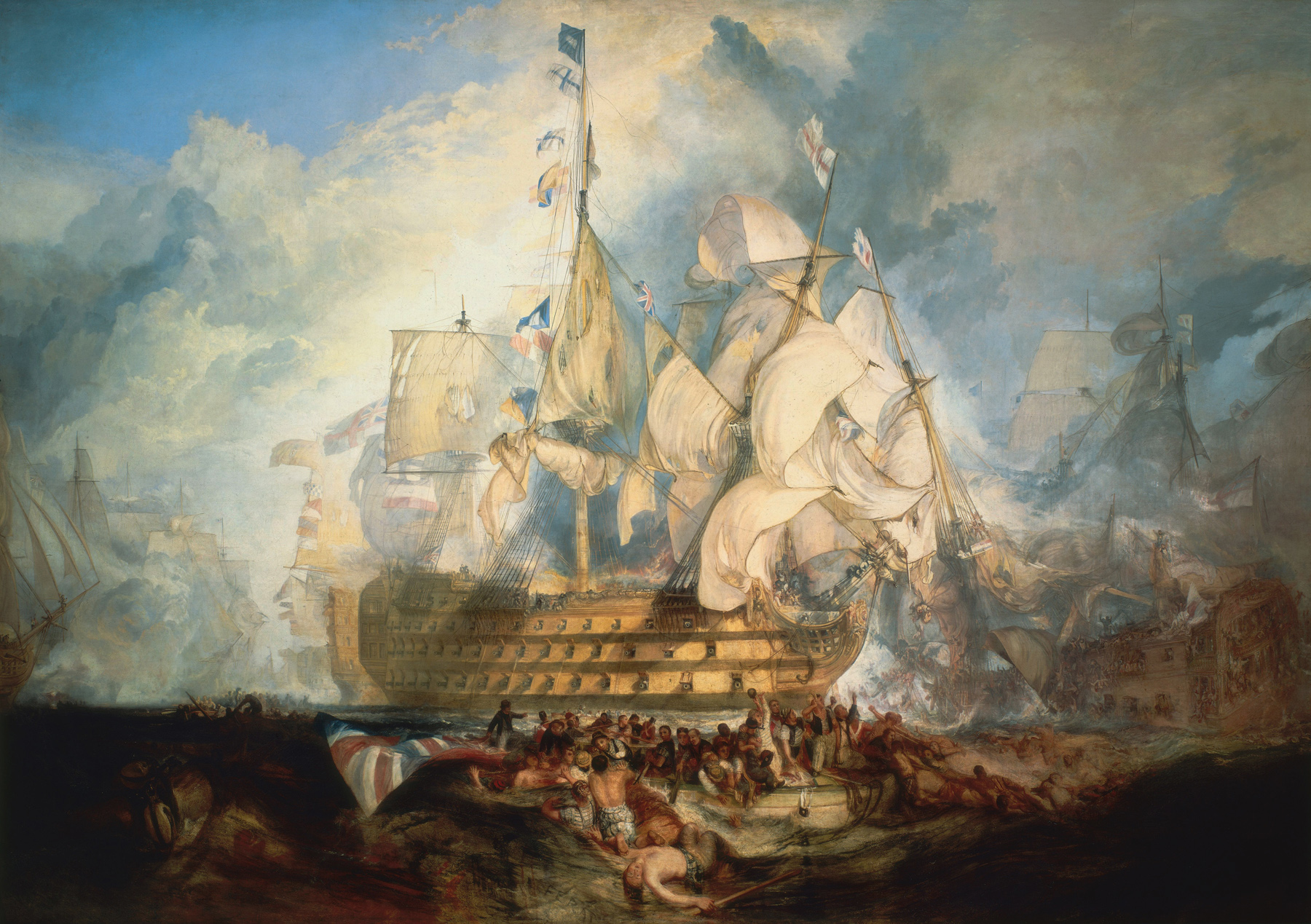
- Observed by: United Kingdom and Commonwealth of Nations
- Significance: Commemorates British naval victory over Spanish and French forces in 1805
- Date: 21 October
- Next time: 21 October 2026
- Frequency: annual

Trafalgar Day is the celebration of the victory won by the Royal Navy, commanded by Vice-Admiral Horatio Nelson, over the combined French and Spanish fleets at the Battle of Trafalgar on 21 October 1805.

== History ==
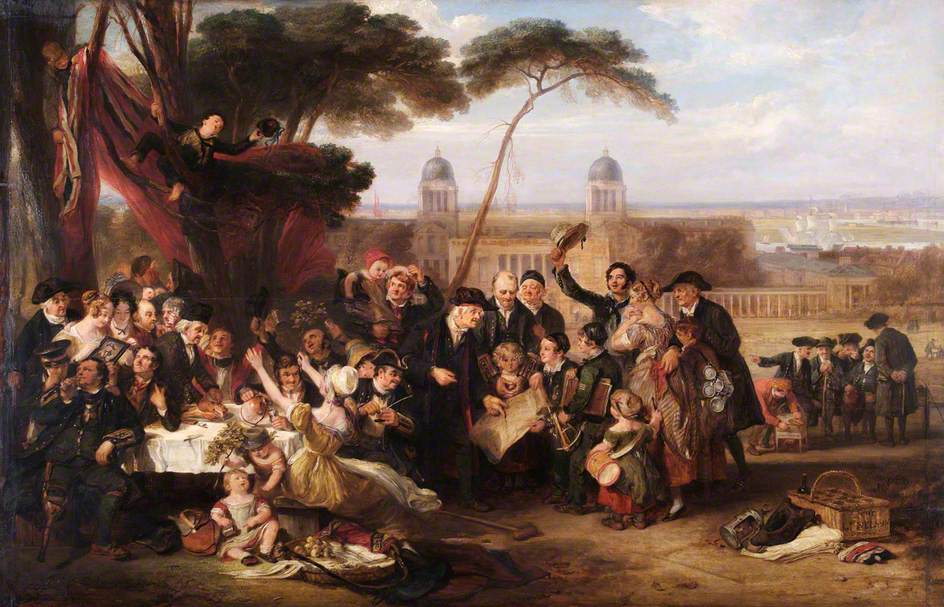
Greenwich Pensioners Commemorating Trafalgar by John Burnet, 1837

The formation of the Navy League in 1894 gave added impetus to the movement to recognise Nelson's legacy, and grand celebrations were held in Trafalgar Square in London on Trafalgar Day, 1896. It was commemorated by parades, dinners and other events throughout much of the British Empire in the 19th century and early 20th century. It continues to be celebrated by navies of the Commonwealth of Nations. Its public celebration declined after the end of World War I in 1918. The massive casualties and upheaval had changed the general public perception of war as a source of glorious victories to a more sombre view of it as a tragedy, for which the newly instituted Armistice Day on 11 November was created. However, Trafalgar Day was still marked as a public day each year. Around 1993, it was rumoured that John Major's government might make it a public holiday in place of May Day, and this plan was revived in the 2011 Tourism Strategy created by the then coalition government.

The year 2005 was the bicentenary of the Battle of Trafalgar, and the Royal Navy led Trafalgar 200 celebrations. The 2005 International Fleet Review held off Spithead in the Solent on 28 June was the first since 1999 and the largest since Her Majesty The Queen's 1977 Silver Jubilee.

== Trafalgar Night ==
On 21 October each year the commissioned officers of the Royal Navy celebrate the victory at the Battle of Trafalgar by holding a Trafalgar Night dinner in the Wardroom (Officers' Mess).

At a Trafalgar Night banquet or dinner, a speech is usually made by a guest of honour who ends it with a toast to "The Immortal Memory ..." (The rest of the wording of the toast varies depending on what is said in the speech). (Note: The precise wording varies depending on what is said in the speech. For example, in 1997, Admiral Jerome L. Johnson (USN) ended his Trafalgar Night speech in Washington with: "To the immortal memory of Admiral Lord Nelson" while in 2016, at the end of his Trafalgar Night speech in Washington, Admiral Sir Philip Jones (First Sea Lord) said: To the immortal memory of Horatio, Viscount Nelson, Duke of Bronte and Vice Admiral of the White, and to those who fell with him. "The immortal memory") On 21 October 2005 (the 200th anniversary), at such a dinner the traditional toast was given by Queen Elizabeth II:

"The Immortal Memory of Lord Nelson and those who fell with him"

The British ambassador in Washington hosts such a dinner at which the guest of honour may be a senior officer in the United States Navy.

== British celebrations ==
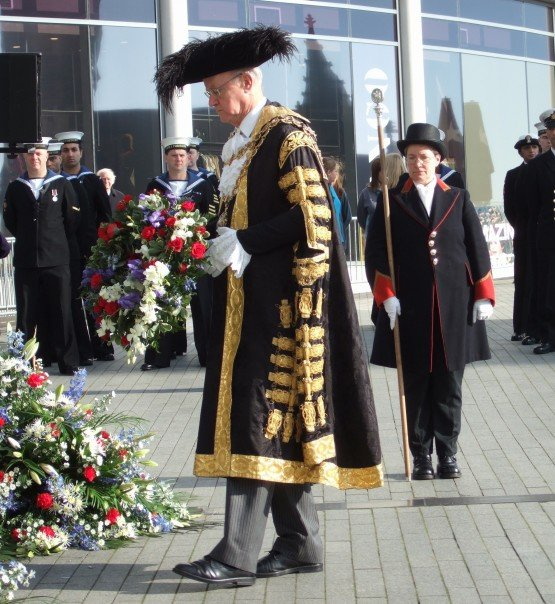
The Lord Mayor of Birmingham lays a wreath at Birmingham's statue of Lord Nelson on Trafalgar Day 2007.

Sea Cadet Corps in the United Kingdom hold a youth cadet parade known as the National Trafalgar Day Parade on Trafalgar Square each year. The parade is formed with a platoon from each area, a guard and a massed band. This is held on the closest Sunday to 21 October. Units and Districts from around the country celebrate this day – usually with a town parade.

Birmingham celebrates the anniversary with a ceremony at the statue of Lord Nelson – the oldest such statue in the United Kingdom – in the Bull Ring. The ceremony is led by the Lord Mayor of Birmingham and involves men and women of HMS Forward, Sea Cadet units from across the West Midlands and various civic organisations, including The Nelson Society and The Birmingham Civic Society. Afterwards representatives of naval and civic organisations lay wreaths and a parade marches off to Victoria Square, the public square in front of the seat of local government, where the Lord Mayor takes the salute.

Another aspect of the Birmingham celebration is that the statue is regaled with swags of laurel and flowers, possibly due to its location by the wholesale flower markets of the city. This tradition, marked through most of the nineteenth century, was revived in 2004.

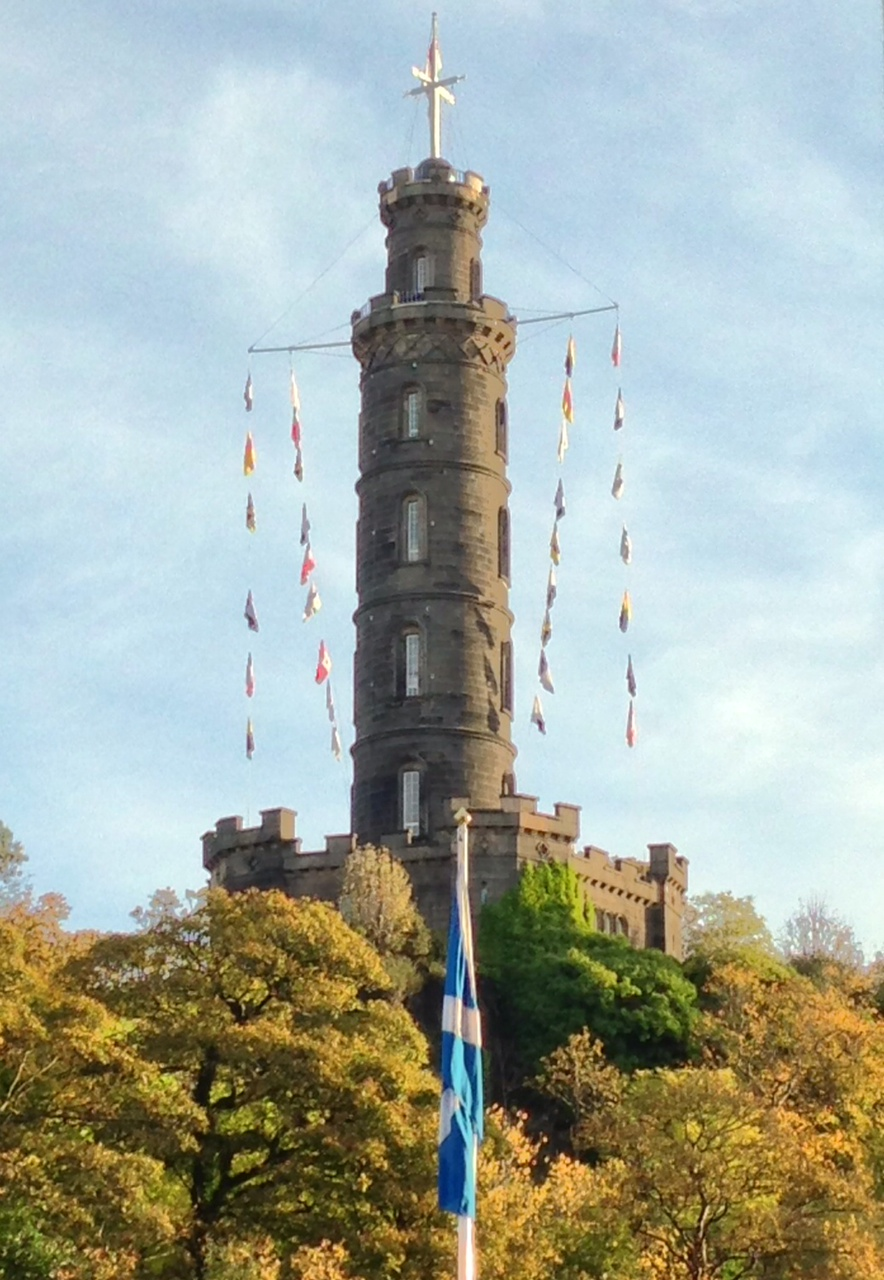
Flags fly from the Nelson Monument on Calton Hill in Edinburgh on Trafalgar Day 2013

In Edinburgh, citizens commissioned the Nelson Monument on Calton Hill in memory of Admiral Lord Nelson. Weather permitting, the Trafalgar flag signal "England expects that every man will do his duty" is flown on Trafalgar Day. Looking like a tall stone telescope, the Nelson Monument contains a time ball which drops at 1 o'clock daily.

The village of Dervock in County Antrim (Northern Ireland) has the only known memorial which takes the form of a stained-glass window depicting Admiral Lord Nelson minutes before he was killed on board HMS Victory in 1805. It is believed that this is the only memorial on the island, Nelson's Pillar in Dublin (the earliest memorial to Admiral Nelson) having been destroyed in 1966, and in 2015 residents organised their first ever "Trafalgar Day".

In Gibraltar, the Trafalgar Day service takes place at the Trafalgar Cemetery, where the senior Naval Commander reads an extract from the Gibraltar Chronicle newspaper, the first periodical to report on the battle. Some sailors died in Gibraltar of wounds received at Trafalgar; they are buried in Gibraltar. HMS Victory, with Nelson's body on board, underwent repairs in Gibraltar prior to sailing for Britain.

In the Isle of Man, John Quilliam, 1st Lieutenant of HMS Victory in 1805, is buried in the graveyard of Kirk Arbory, Ballabeg. An annual parade and church service takes place on Trafalgar Day.

== International celebrations ==
The victory is celebrated in Nelson, New Zealand (named after Horatio Nelson), usually in Trafalgar Square and sometimes involves pupils from the local Victory Primary School. Many streets in Nelson are named after Trafalgar and crew members of Victory.

The victory is celebrated each year in the Australian town of Trafalgar, Victoria, in which the small town of 2,200 holds an annual Battle of Trafalgar Festival with the Trafalgar Day Ball held on the Friday or Saturday closest to 21 October each year.
