= Greenwich pensioner =

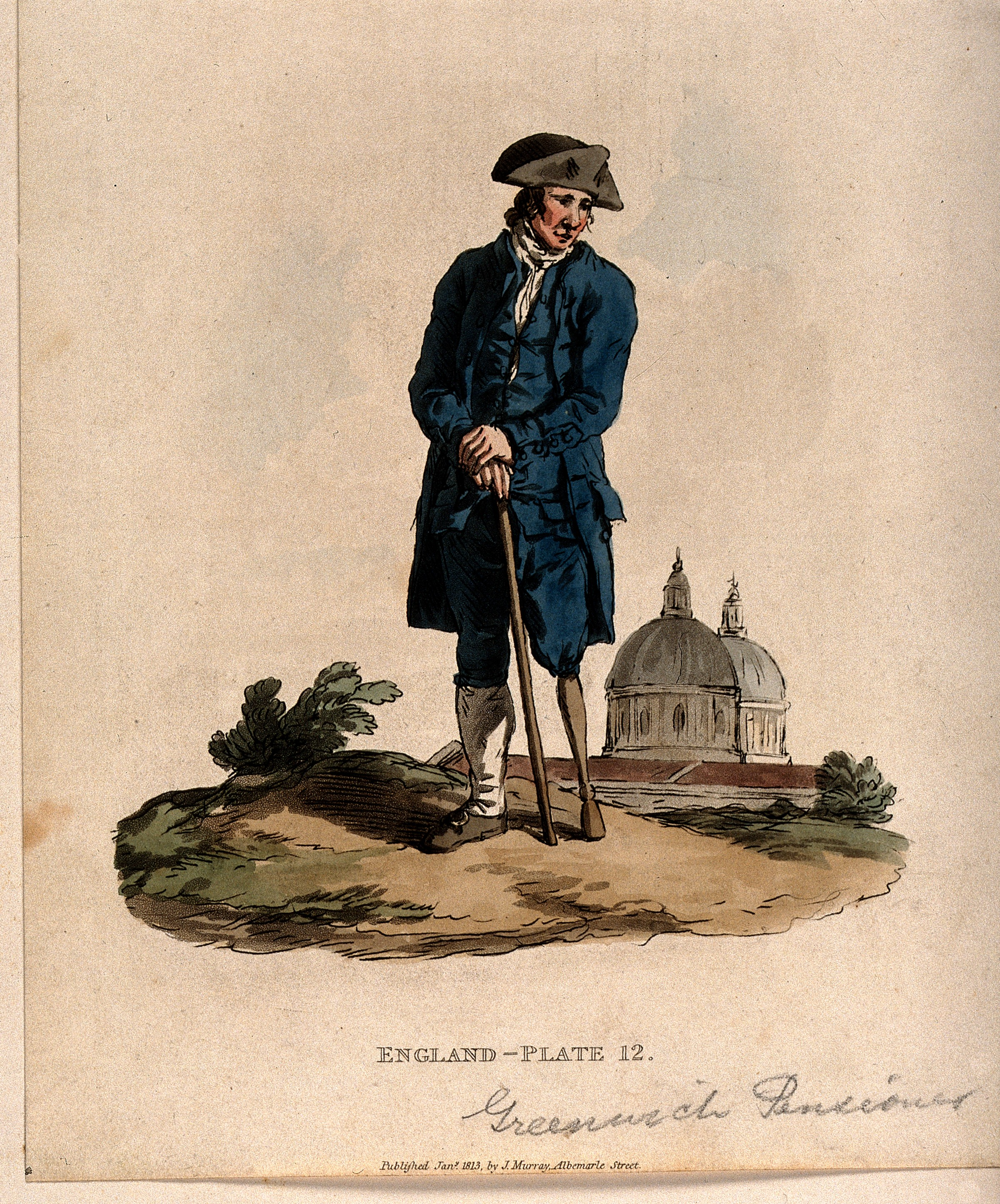
A Greenwich Pensioner

A Greenwich Pensioner was the Naval equivalent of a Chelsea Pensioner.

Although the initial concept of a Greenwich pensioner was that of someone living in the Royal Hospital Greenwich, the institution became responsible for the payment of pensions in 1804 (taking over the responsibility from the Chatham Chest). The Royal Hospital for Seamen, as it was originally called, now the Old Royal Naval College, has been described as "poshest pensioners home that ever was".

== In- and Out-Pensioners ==
Those former sailors and marines who lived in the hospital were known as "in-pensioners". Those who drew a pension but did not reside at Royal Hospital Greenwich were known as "out-pensioners".

It was permissible for "out-pensioners" to apply for entry to Greenwich, thereby relinquishing their out-pension. (Note: 'Men in the receipt of out-pensions relinquish them for the time they are domicilèd in the Hospital, but they are at liberty, under certain restrictions, to resume their pensions and leave the Institution, being eligible for re-admission after the lapse of a year.')

William IV gave his approval that, from 1831 onwards, ratings or marines with 21 years of continuous service could apply for a pension, on the proviso they were not discharged with disgrace or misconduct. (Note: 'Regulations for granting out-pensions from Greenwich Hospital to the Warrant and Petty Officers herein mentioned, and to Seamen, and Royal Marines, established by His Majesty's Order in Council of 24 August 1831') Similar deferred remuneration was made available to Chelsea out-pensioners. Queen Victoria gave her assent to a revision of these rules in 1838, in respect of warrant officers.

== Life of In-Pensioners ==
Greenwich Hospital from the West Side by James Holland, 1850, featuring a number of Greenwich pensioners in the crowd

In common with the union workhouses of the 19th century, the families of the men were not allowed to reside with the men. If a resident wished to leave the hospital, they were free to do so. If they wanted to re-enter, they would have to wait until a year had passed.

The residents were bound by militarised rules and regulations. Like their contemporaries at Chelsea, they wore a uniform of tricorne hats, albeit with grey coats, from the eighteenth century onwards. Pensioners who broke the rules would have to wear a yellow coat, known as a "canary", and would have to perform menial tasks while wearing this garment. From 1805 until 1869, pensioners were issued with a distinctive uniform comprising a blue frock coat with brass buttons, white waistcoat and pantaloons, black shoes, and a tricorne similar to those issued to their army counterparts at Chelsea. Greenwich pensioners had adopted a standardised uniform long before the ratings of the Royal Navy in 1857.

Greenwich pensioners were in residence from 1705 to 1869, and acquired the nickname "Greenwich geese" from the townspeople of Greenwich. Since 2010, the lifestyle of Greenwich Pensioners is presented within the Discover Greenwich tourist attraction as part of the Visitor Centre in the Pepys Building.

== Genealogical records ==
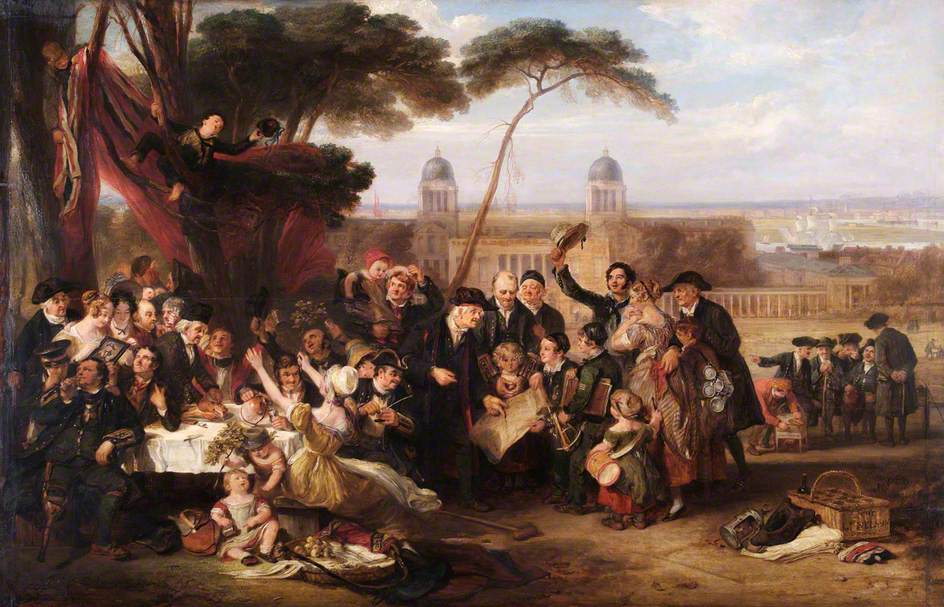
Greenwich Pensioners Commemorating Trafalgar by John Burnet, 1837

It is possible to identify in-Pensioners on census returns, at Greenwich. Similarly, there are instances whereby an out-Pensioner will be recorded as "Greenwich Pensioner or "Naval Pensioner" whilst living in a location other than Greenwich.

=== In-Pensioners ===
There are admission & discharge registers of in-Pensioners that have survived. They have been digitised, and can be accessed via a paywall.

=== Out-Pensioners ===
There are registers of the quarterly payments made to out-Pensioners that have survived. They have been digitised, and can be accessed via a paywall.

== Notes and citations ==
Notes

Citations
