= Greenwich Pensioners Commemorating Trafalgar =

Painting by John Burnet

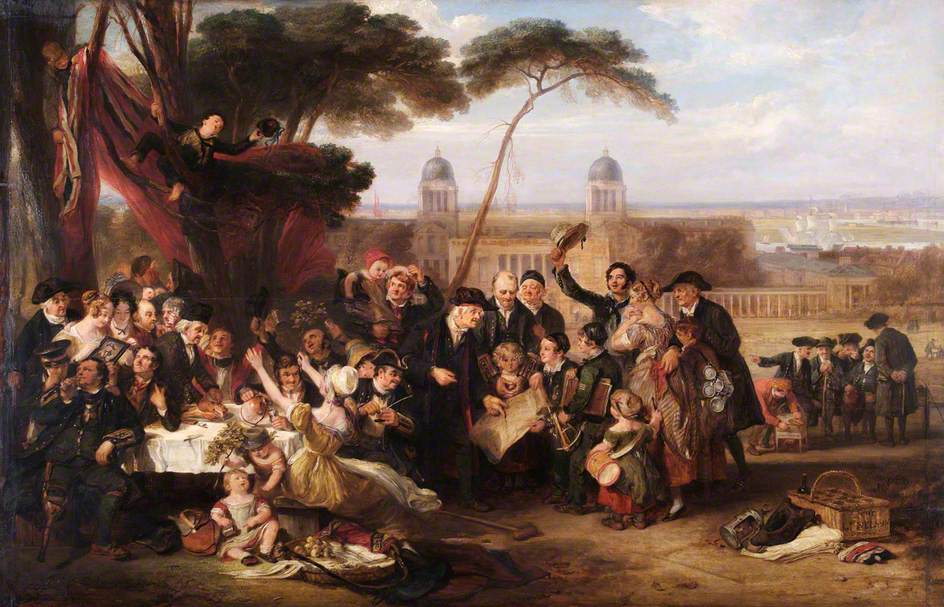
- Artist: John Burnet
- Year: c.1837
- Type: Oil on canvas, history painting
- Dimensions: 97 cm × 153 cm (38 in × 60 in)
- Location: Apsley House; London

Greenwich Pensioners Commemorating Trafalgar is an 1837 oil painting by the British artist John Burnet. It shows a group of Greenwich pensioners celebrating Trafalgar Day, the annual anniversary of the Royal Navy's victory at the Battle of Trafalgar in 1805. They are shown in Greenwich Park with the Greenwich Hospital and the River Thames in the background.

It was produced speculatively by Burnet as a companion piece for the 1822 painting Chelsea Pensioners reading the Waterloo Dispatch which had been enormously popular. It was displayed at the annual exhibition of the British Institution in 1837. It was then acquired by the Duke of Wellington, who already owned the Wilkie painting, for 500 guineas and remains in the Wellington Collection at Apsley House by Hyde Park Corner. An engraving was produced based on the painting by Burnet himself, a copy of which is in the National Maritime Museum in Greenwich. Several of those depicted are real figures who had served during the Napoleonic Wars.

== Bibliography ==
- Jervis, Simon & Tomlin, Maurice. Apsley House, Wellington Museum. Victoria and Albert Museum, 1997.
- Muir, Rory. Wellington: Waterloo and the Fortunes of Peace 1814–1852. Yale University Press, 2015.
