= Greenwich Hospital from the West Side =

Painting by James Holland

- Artist: James Holland
- Year: 1850
- Type: Oil on canvas, landscape painting
- Dimensions: 129.5 cm × 104.1 cm (51.0 in × 41.0 in)
- Location: National Maritime Museum, London

Greenwich Hospital from the West Side is an 1850 oil painting by the British artist James Holland. It depicts a view of Greenwich Hospital on its western side, seen looking down what is now College Walk towards Grand Square. Groups of figures are shown walking amongst the buildings including Greenwich pensioners. His use of contrasting light altering it from a simple topographical depiction. The painting was commissioned by Richard Hollier of nearby Maze Hill whose widow presented it to Greenwich Hospital in 1856. It is also known by the shorter title Greenwich Hospital.

The picture featured at the Royal Academy Exhibition of 1851 held at the National Gallery. The painting was also displayed at the Salon of 1855 in Paris and again at the Exposition Universelle in 1867. Holland painted a separate Greenwich Hospital from the East in 1854. Both paintings are now in the collection of the National Maritime Museum in Greenwich.

== Bibliography ==
- Bonehill, John. (ed.) Art for the Nation: The Oil Paintings Collections of the National Maritime Museum. National Maritime Museum, 2006
- Wright, Christopher, Gordon, Catherine May & Smith, Mary Peskett. British and Irish Paintings in Public Collections: An Index of British and Irish Oil Paintings by Artists Born Before 1870 in Public and Institutional Collections in the United Kingdom and Ireland. Yale University Press, 2006
