= James Ramsay (painter) =

English painter

- Born: 1789; Sheffield, England
- Died: 23 June 1854 (aged 64–65); Newcastle-upon-Tyne, England
- Known for: Portrait painting

James Ramsay (1789 – 23 June 1854) was an English painter who specialised in portrait painting.

== Life ==
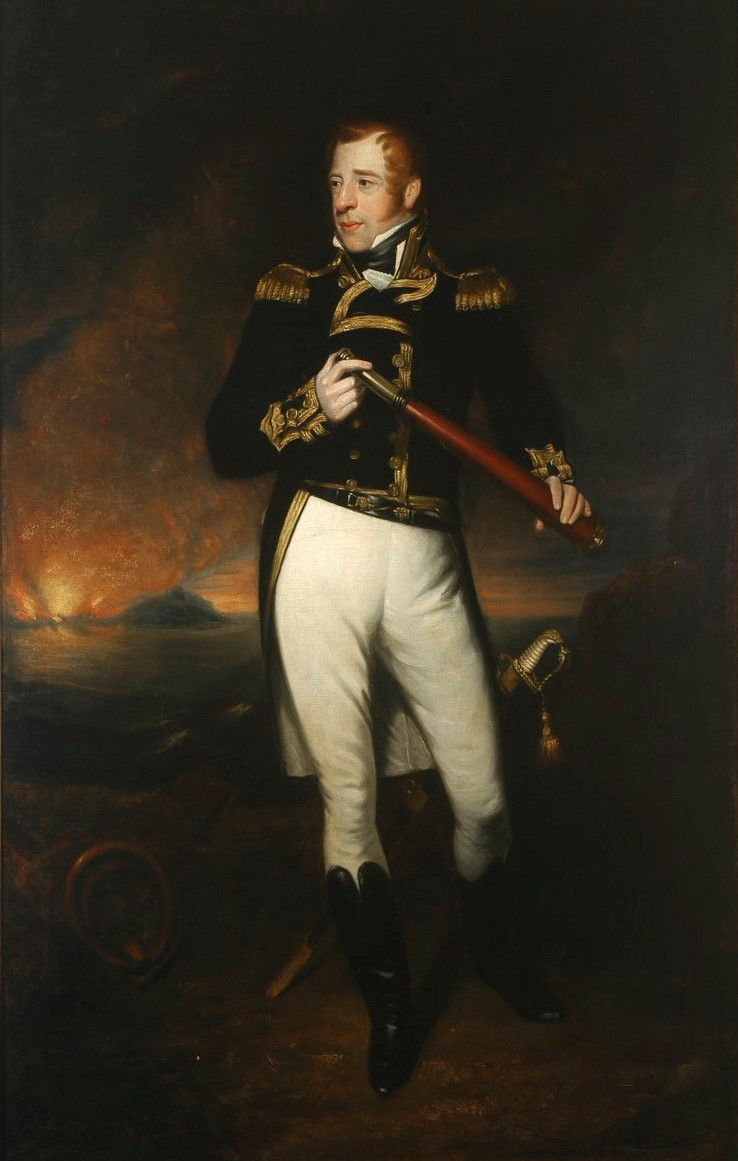
1830 portrait of Thomas Cochrane by Ramsay

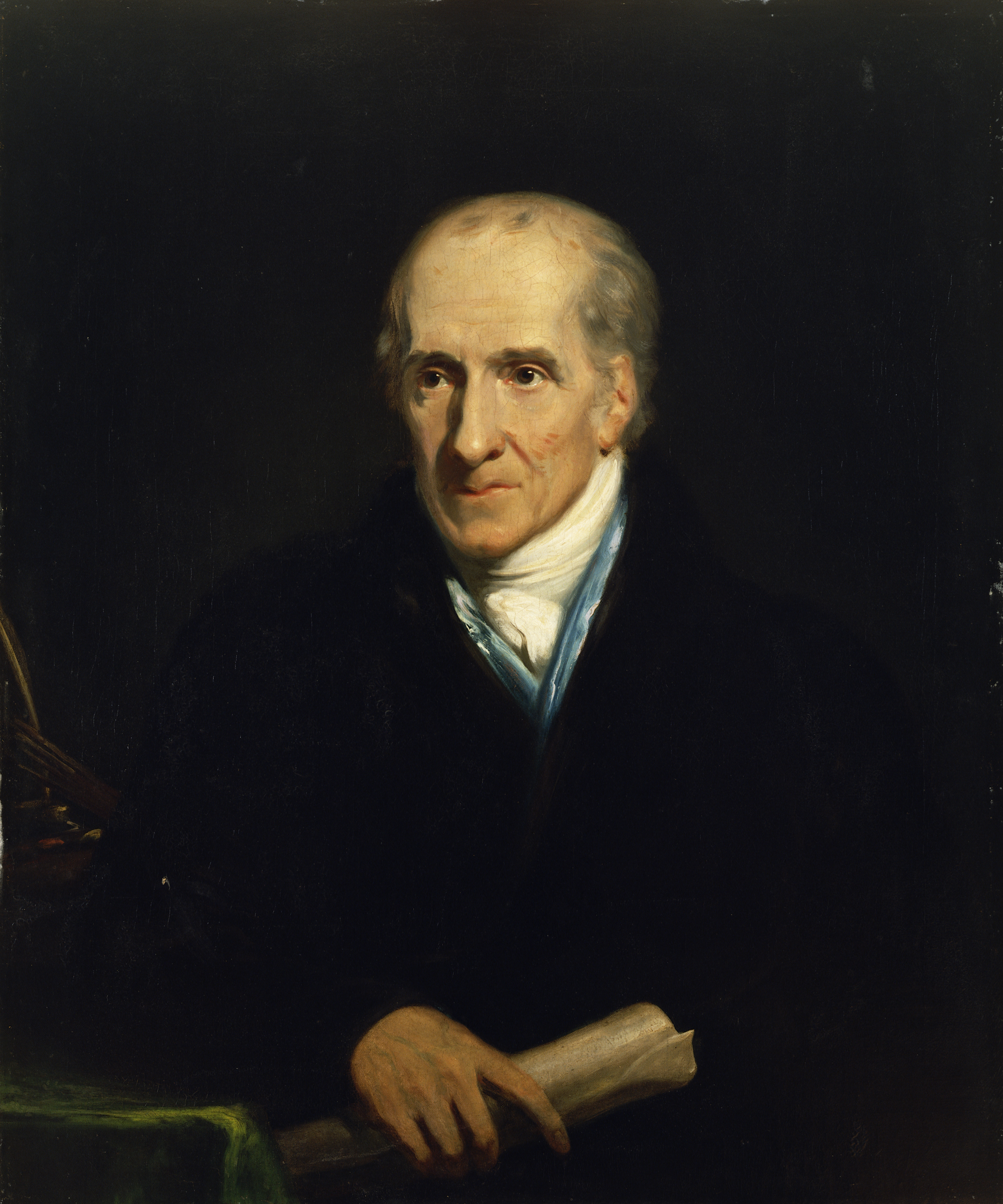
c. 1825 portrait of James Northcote by Ramsay

Ramsay was born in Sheffield, where his father Robert Ramsay was an artisan and dealer, who took on Francis Chantrey as apprentice in 1797. Robert Ramsay also published some engravings by John Raphael Smith. While still a youth, James Ramsay was painting professionally in the family business, and exhibited at age 17.

Ramsay died, after a protracted illness, at 40 Blackett Street, Newcastle-upon-Tyne, on 23 June 1854, aged 68.

== Exhibitions ==
Ramsay's name first appeared in the catalogue of the Royal Academy Exhibition of 1803, when he sent a self-portrait. Three years later he exhibited a portrait of Henry Grattan, and in 1810 one of John Towneley. In 1811 his contributions included portraits of the Earl of Moira and Lord Cochrane, and in 1813 that of Lord Brougham, whom he again painted in 1818.

In 1814 Ramsay sent to the academy two scriptural subjects, Peter denying Christ and Peter's Repentance, and in 1819 views of Tynemouth Priory and of North and South Shields, but his works were mainly portraits. There are at least three by him of Thomas Bewick; the earliest, exhibited in 1816, and engraved by John Burnet, went to the Hancock Museum of the Newcastle Natural History Society; another, which appeared at the Royal Academy in 1823, to the National Portrait Gallery; and a third, a small full-length engraved by Frederick Bacon, belonged to Robert Stirling Newall of Gateshead. A portrait by him of Charles Grey, 2nd Earl Grey, painted for the Literary and Philosophical Society of Newcastle-upon-Tyne, and later in Newcastle town hall, was exhibited in 1837, together with that of Dr Thomas Elliotson, which went to the Royal College of Physicians. His portrait of Henry Grattan, which was passed down in the Grattan family, was engraved in mezzotint by Charles Turner, and a copy of it by Sir Thomas Alfred Jones went to the National Gallery of Ireland.

Ramsay also exhibited scriptural, historical, and fancy subjects at the British Institution, including Isaac blessing Jacob, in 1813, The Trial of King Charles the First, in 1829, and The Entry of the Black Prince into London, in 1841; and also a few portraits at the Society of British Artists. About 1847 Ramsay left London for Newcastle-upon-Tyne, but he continued to exhibit at the Royal Academy, where he had another portrait of himself in 1849. He was successful, and painted portraits of members of Lord Clifford's family, James Northcote, Dionysius Lardner, and many others.

== Museums and galleries ==
Ramsay's works are represented in many museums and galleries around Britain, with at least 25 portraits in public collections.

- National Portrait Gallery (London): oil of Thomas Bewick; 34 mezzotints by Charles Turner and others, after his drawings.
- National Railway Museum, York: oil of Michael Longridge.
- Royal Albert Memorial Museum, Exeter: Portrait of James Northcote.
