= James Holland (artist) =

British artist (1799–1870)

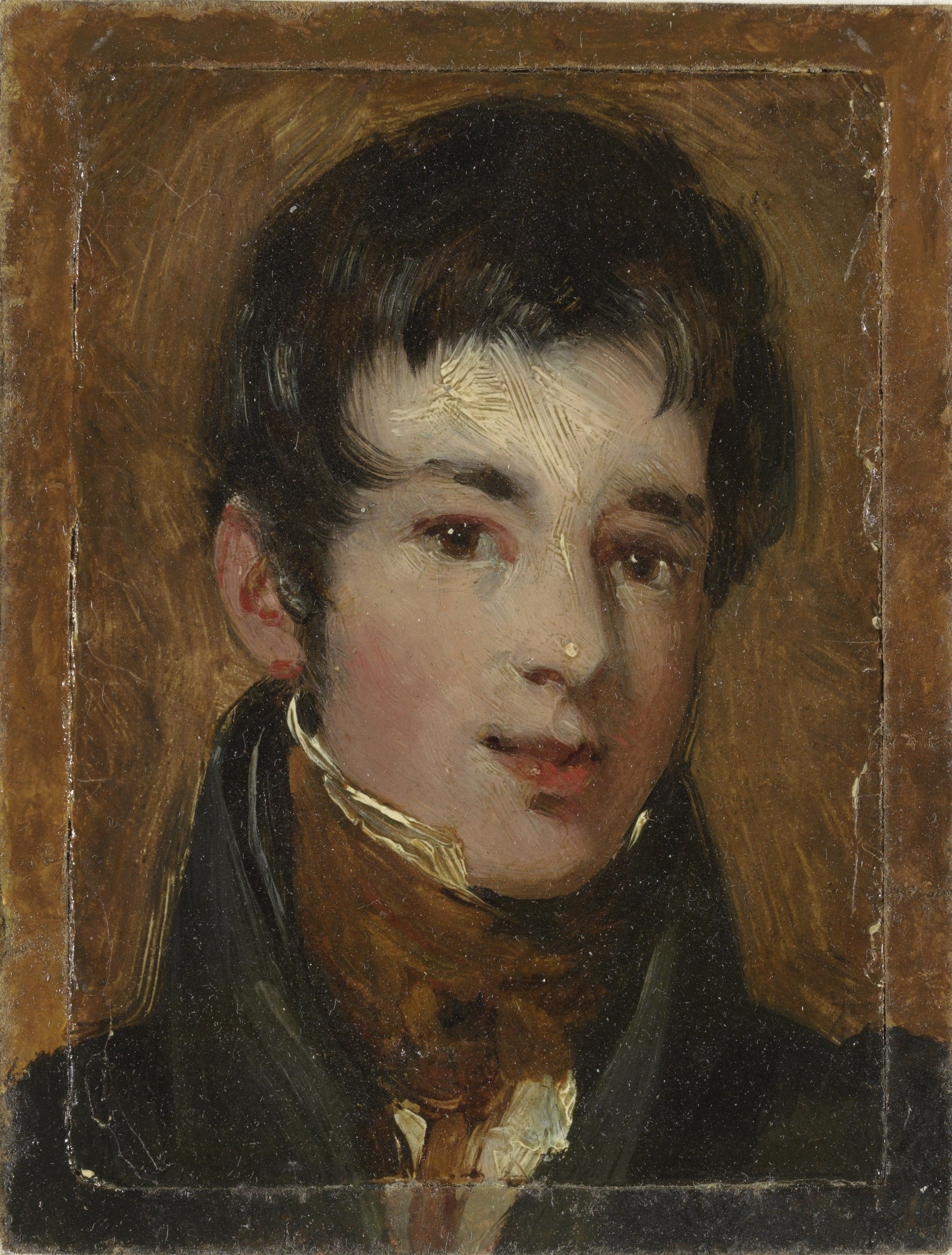
Self portrait of James Holland

Greenwich Hospital from the West Side, 1850

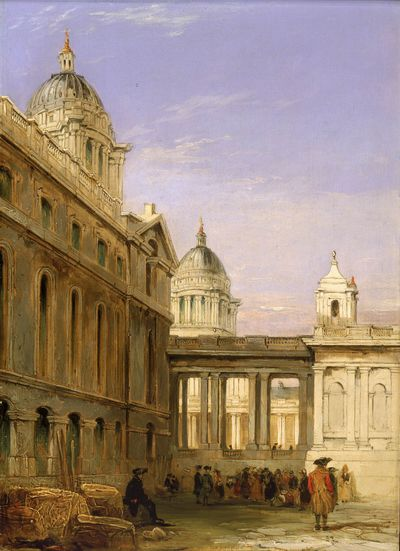
The King William Quadrangle of Greenwich Hospital

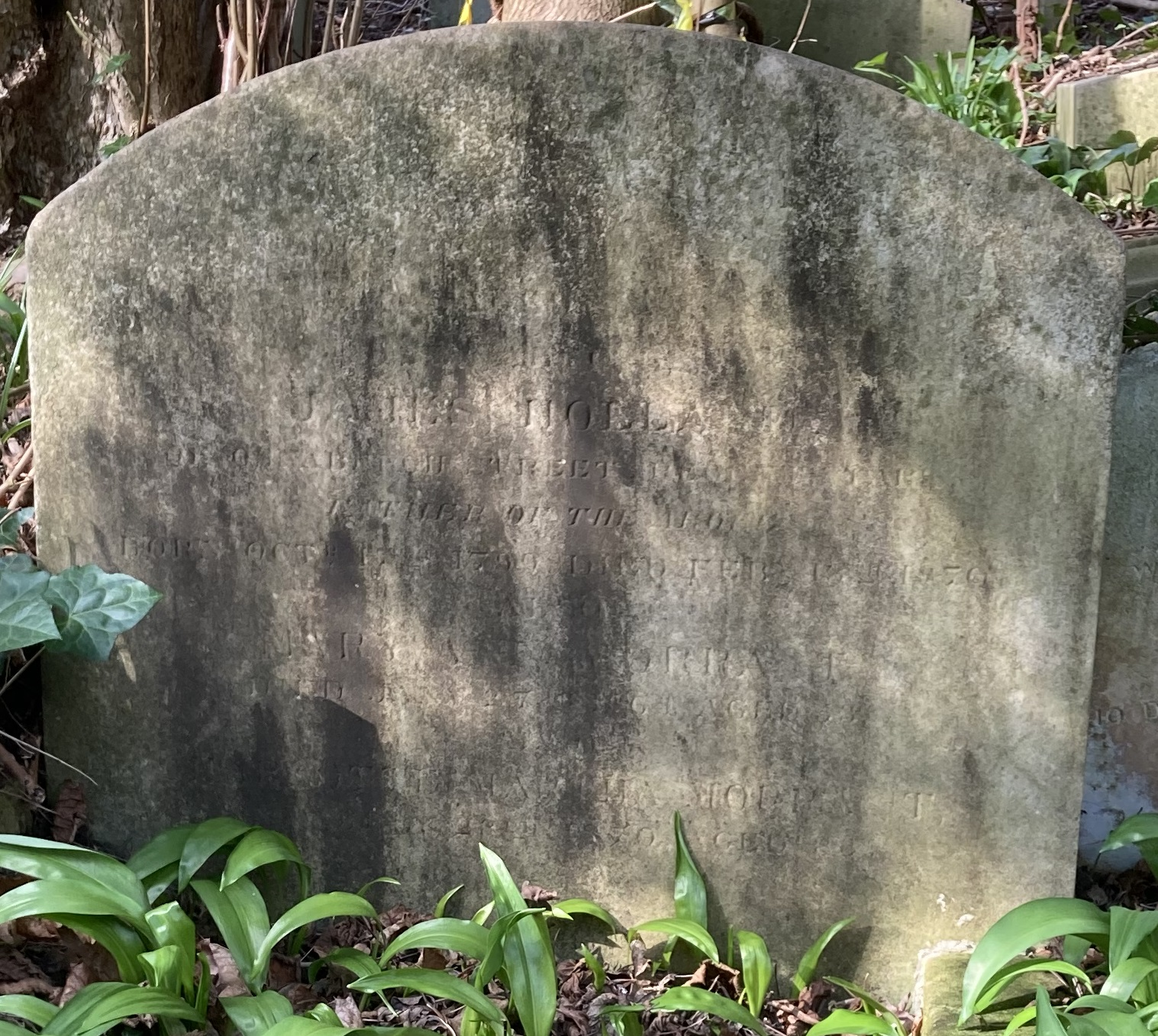
Grave of James Holland in Highgate Cemetery

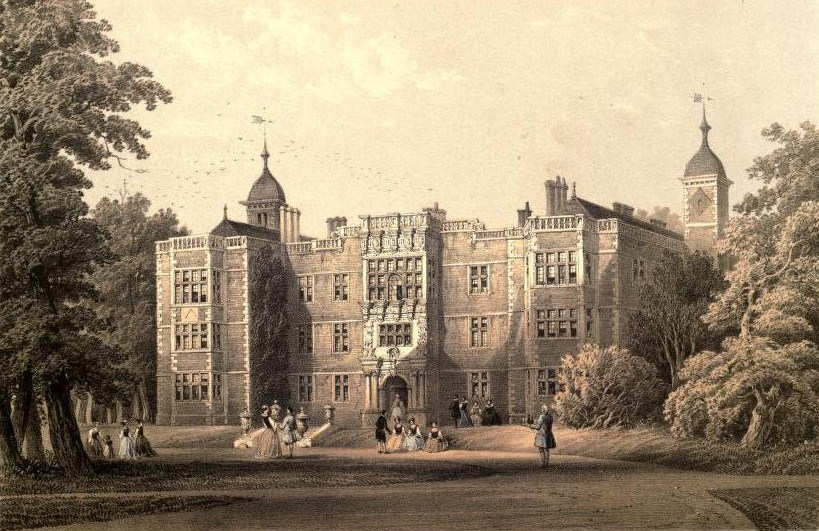
Charlton House, Kent (Tinted lithograph, 1858)

James Holland (18 October 1799 – 12 February 1870) was an English painter of flowers, landscapes, architecture, marine subjects, and a book illustrator. He worked in both oils and watercolours and was a member of the Royal Watercolour Society.

== Life and work ==
Holland was born in Burslem, Staffordshire, where his grandfather, Thomas Holland, produced pottery. James was employed in Longport at the pottery works of William Davenport, from the age of 12, for 7 years, painting flowers on pottery and porcelain. In 1819, he came to London where he continued to work as a pottery painter, but also gave lessons in drawing landscapes, architecture, and marine subjects.

He first exhibited at the Royal Academy in 1824 and in 1830 visited France and made studies of its architecture. In 1823, he exhibited a picture of 'London from Blackheath'. In 1835, he became an associate exhibitor of The Society of Painters in Water-colours, but he left the society in 1843, and joined the Society of British Artists, of which he remained a member until 1848. He rejoined the Watercolour Society in 1856, and was elected a full member two years later.

Holland did a great deal of drawing for the illustrated annuals of the day, and for this purpose visited Venice, Milan, Geneva, and Paris in 1836, and Portugal in 1837. His paintings of Portugal were published in the book, "The Tourist in Portugal". In 1839 he exhibited a painting of Lisbon at the Royal Academy. In 1845 he went to Rotterdam, Portugal again in 1847, in 1850 to Normandy and North Wales, in 1851 again to Geneva, and in 1857 again to Venice.

In the course of his life he exhibited, in addition to his contributions to the Watercolour Society, 32 pictures at the Royal Academy, 91 at the British Institution, and 108 at the Society of British Artists. Though generally classed as a water-colour painter, he was equally skilful in oils. He was one of the finest colourists of the English school, and his pictures, especially those of Venice, though neglected in his lifetime, became much sought after in the years after his death. He appears to have ceased exhibiting in 1857. He died on 12 February 1870 and was buried on the western side of Highgate Cemetery.

One of Holland's pupils was topographical artist Frank Dillon (1823–1909), known especially for his paintings of England.
