= John Burnet (painter) =

Scottish engraver and painter (1781/1784–1868)

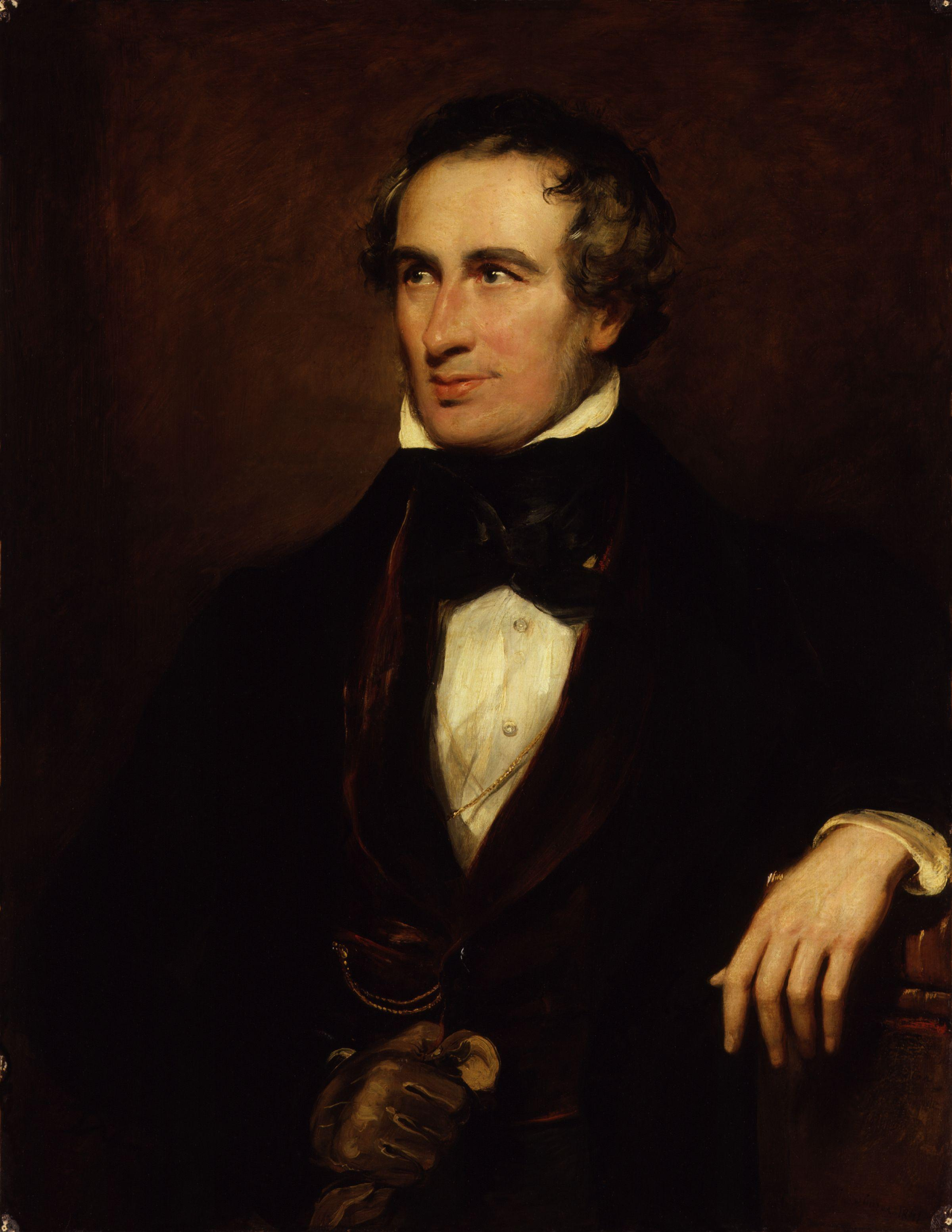
William Simson, John Burnet, 1841, oil on canvas, National Portrait Gallery, London

John Burnet (March 1781 or 20 March 1784 – 29 April 1868) was a Scottish engraver and painter.

== Life ==
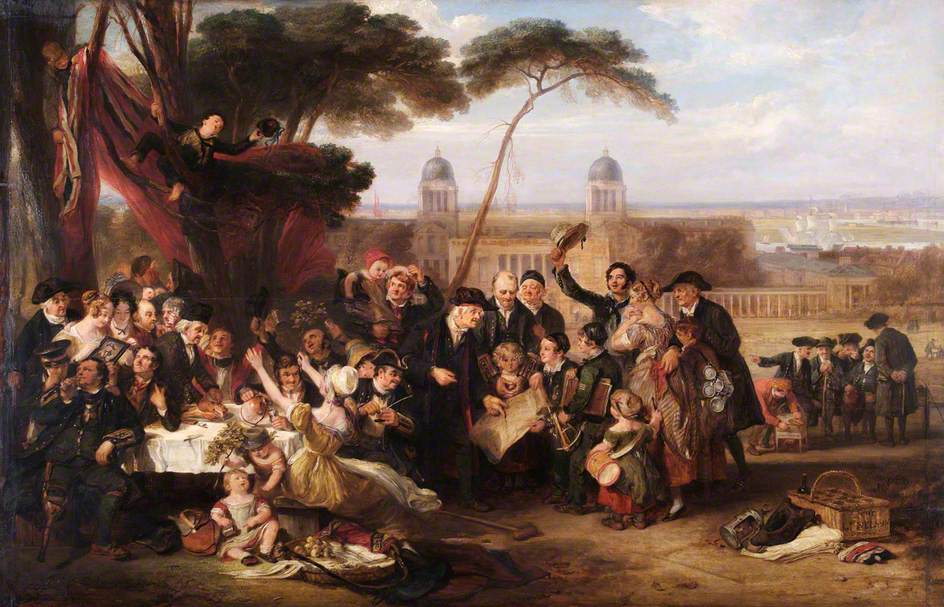
Greenwich Pensioners Commemorating Trafalgar, 1837

Son of the Surveyor-General of Excise of Scotland, Burnet was born either in Edinburgh in 1781 or in Fisherrow in 1784. He was apprenticed to the engraver Robert Scott and later trained at the Trustees Academy.

In 1806, he moved from Edinburgh to London, where he became an established painter of portraits, landscapes, and rural genre scenes.

Between 1808 and 1862, he exhibited regularly at the Royal Academy, the British Institution and with the Society of British Artists and was finally awarded a fellowship to the Royal Society.

As an engraver he provided illustrations for editions of Robert Burns’s poems and Walter Scott’s Waverley novels.

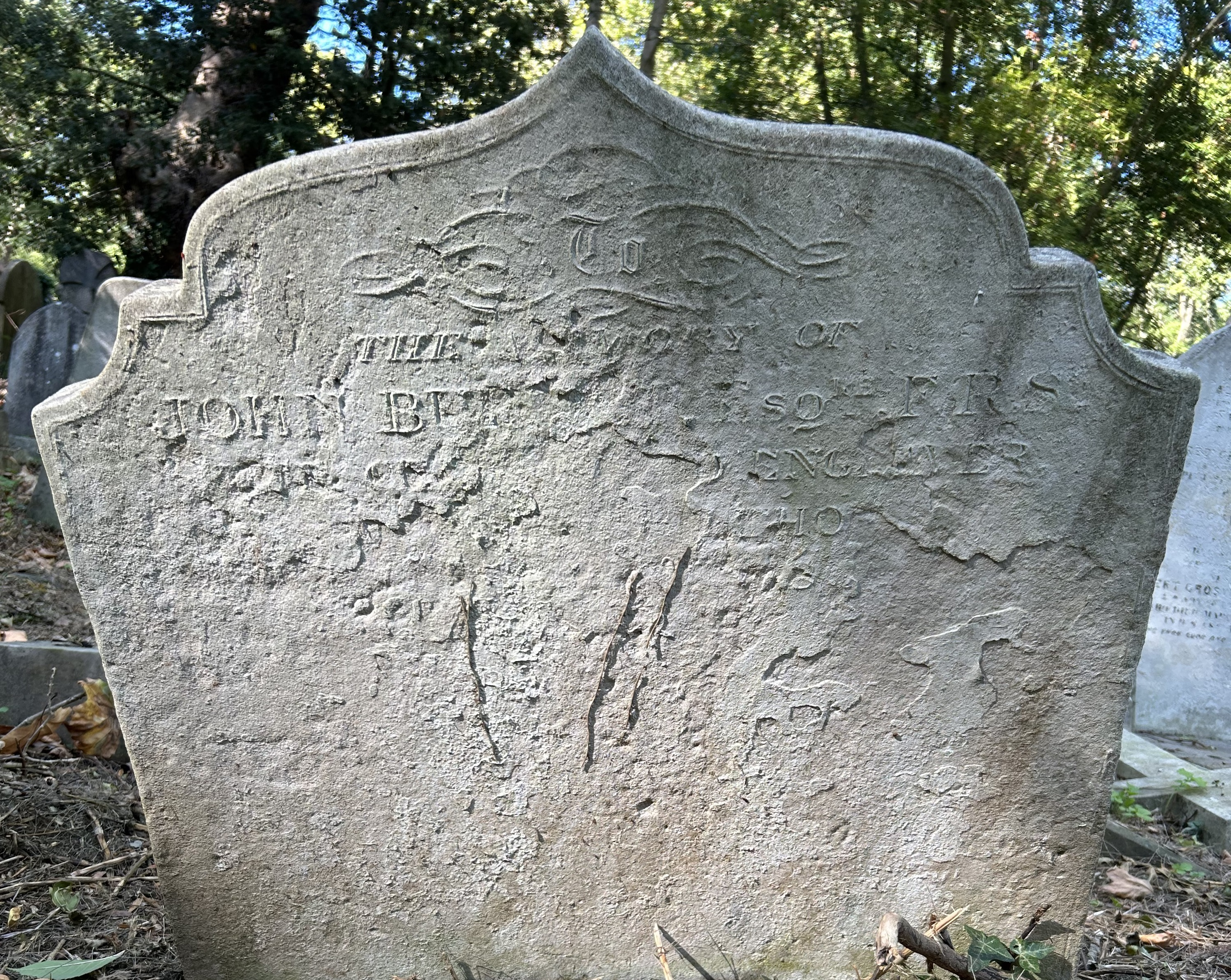
Grave of John Burnet in Highgate Cemetery

He engraved copies of paintings of several notable portraits and artists.

He also wrote manuals and books on drawing, painting and artists, retiring from public life in 1860. He died in London and was buried on the eastern side of Highgate Cemetery. The Cemetery records show his age at death as 84 which suggests that he was born in 1784.

== Engravings ==
- 1817 line engraving of Thomas Bewick after James Ramsay
- 1820 line engraving of Thomas Moore after Sir Martin Archer Shee
- 1828 line engraving of Thomas Campbell after Sir Thomas Lawrence
- 1839 mixed-method engraving of the Duke of Wellington
- 1846 mixed-method engraving of Sir Edwin Landseer's painting 'The Challenge.'
