= 1820 in art =

Events in the year 1820 in Art.

== Events ==
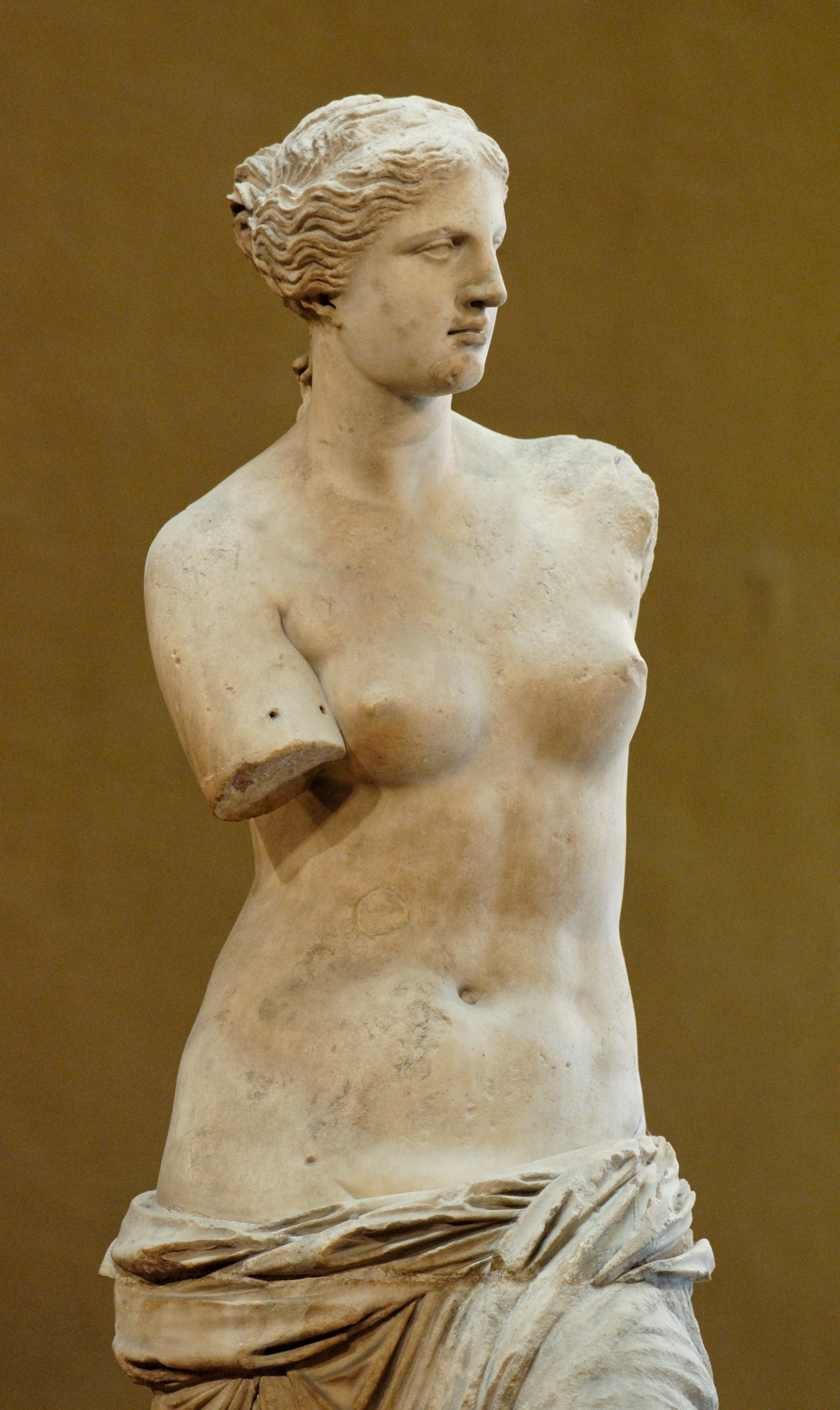
Venus de Milo on display at the Louvre

- April 8 - The Venus de Milo is discovered on the island of Melos (Greek: Milos).
- Publication of William Blake's prophetic book of coloured engravings, Jerusalem: The Emanation of the Giant Albion (commenced 1804), is completed in London with the first printing.

== Works ==
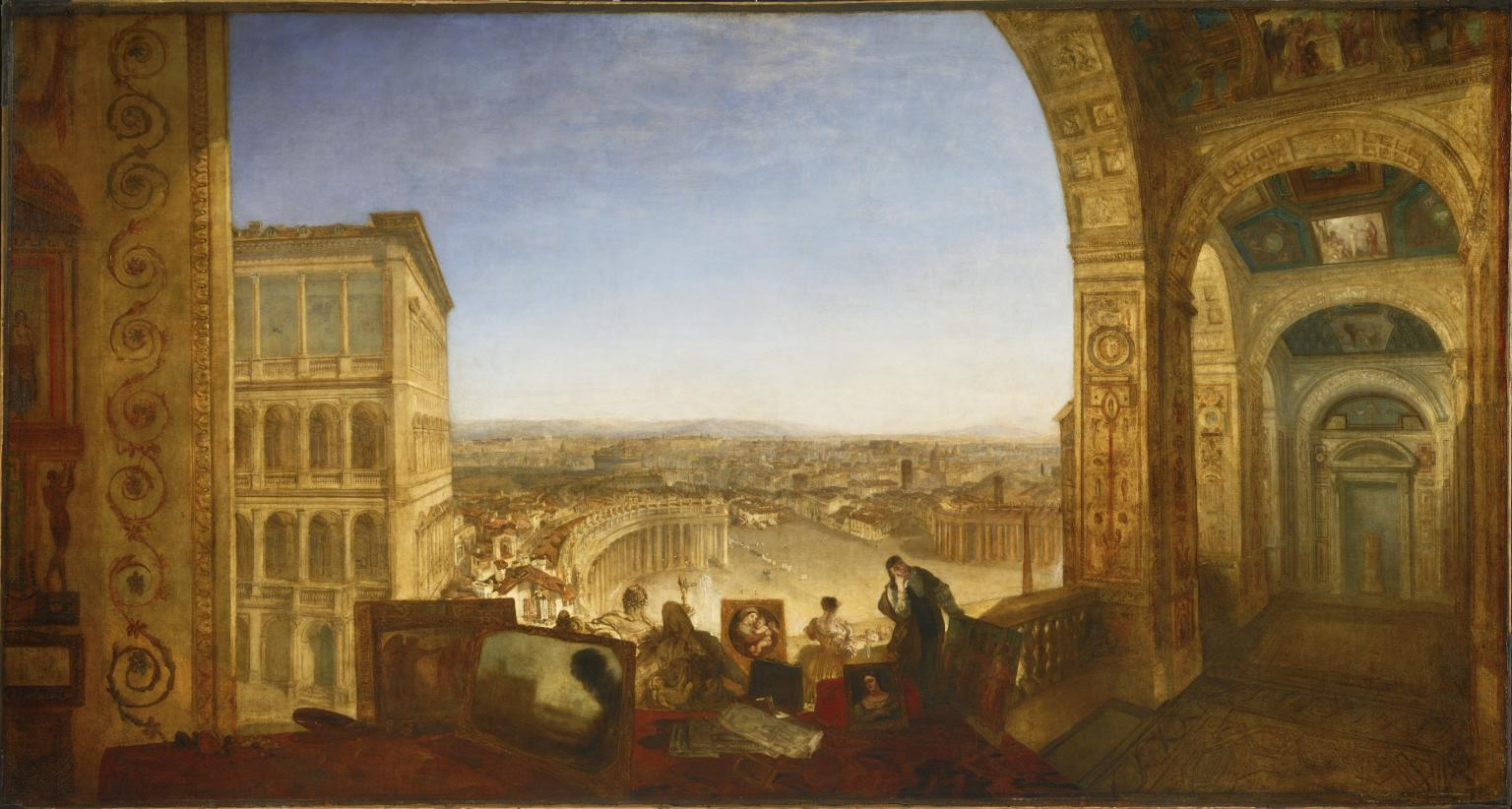
Rome from the Vatican by Turner.

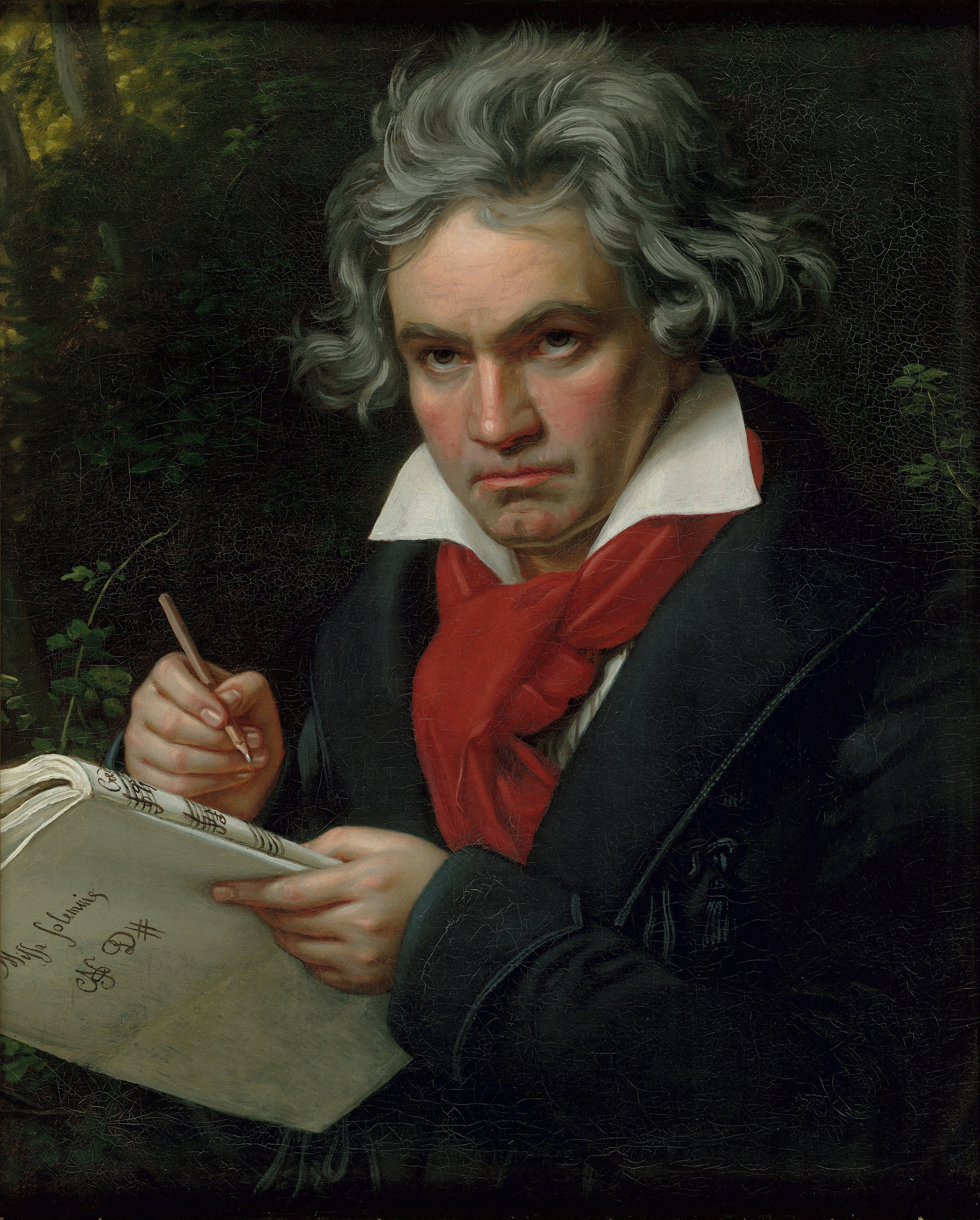
Portrait of Beethoven by Joseph Karl Stieler.

- William Beechey – Portrait of George Cockburn
- William Blake – The Ghost of a Flea
- Augustus Wall Callcott – A Dead Calm on the Medway
- William Collins – Young Anglers
- Antonio Canova – George Washington (installed in the North Carolina State House in 1821 – destroyed by fire-induced structural collapse in 1831)
- John Constable
  - Hampstead Heath with the Salt Box
  - Harwich Lighthouse
  - Salisbury Cathedral from Lower Marsh Close
  - Water Meadows near Salisbury
  - Waterloo Bridge
- George Cruikshank – Two Green Bags
- Johan Christian Dahl – View from a Window at Quisisana
- William Etty
  - Female Nude in a Landscape
- François Gérard – Portrait of the Duke of Berry
- Francisco Goya – Self-portrait with Dr Arrieta
- Chester Harding – Portrait of Daniel Boone
- Francesco Hayez - Pietro Rossi
- George Hayter
  - Portrait of Lord Holland
  - Venus Supported by Iris, Complaining to Mars
- William Hilton
  - The Mermaid of Galloway
  - Venus in Search of Cupid Surprises Diana
- John Jackson – Portrait of Antonio Canova
- Johann Peter Krafft – The Battle of Aspern-Essling
- Edwin Landseer – Alpine Mastiffs Reanimating a Distressed Traveller
- Thomas Lawrence
  - Portrait of Thomas Campbell
  - Portrait of Lord Liverpool
- Thomas Luny – Bombardment of Algiers
- John Martin – Macbeth
- Thomas Phillips – Portrait of Earl Grey
- Jean-Baptiste Regnault
  - The Judgement of Paris (approximate date)
  - Love and Hymen drinking from the cup of Friendship (Musée Bossuet, Meaux)
- Joseph Karl Stieler - Portrait of Beethoven
- John Trumbull – Surrender of Lord Cornwallis
- J. M. W. Turner – Rome from the Vatican
- Horace Vernet – La Barrière de Clichy
- David Wilkie – Reading the Will

== Births ==
- February 18 – Pierre Alexandre Schoenewerk, French sculptor (died 1885)
- February 28 – John Tenniel, English illustrator (died 1914)
- April 6 – Nadar, French photographer and caricaturist (died 1910)
- May 12 – Josef Mánes, Czech painter (died 1871)
- July 9 – John Wright Oakes, English landscape painter (died 1887)
- July 25 – Henry Doulton, English potter (died 1897)
- November 23 – Ludwig von Hagn, German painter (died 1898)
- December – Eugène Fromentin, French painter (died 1876)
- December 16 – George Scharf, English art critic and curator (died 1895)
- date unknown – John Frederick Herring, Jr., English sporting and equestrian painter (died 1897)

== Deaths ==
- January 29 – George III of the United Kingdom, patron of the arts and collector (born 1738)
- March 8 – Kitao Shigemasa, Japanese ukiyo-e artist from Edo (born 1739)
- March 9 – Hermanus Numan, Dutch artist, art theorist, and publisher (born 1744)
- March 11 – Benjamin West, American-born English painter (born 1738)
- March 27 – Gerhard von Kügelgen, German painter of portraits and history paintings (born 1772)
- May 17 – Vincenzo Brenna, Italian painter and house architect of Paul I of Russia (born 1747)
- May 26 – Antonio Longo, Italian priest and painter (born 1742)
- September 15 – Okada Beisanjin, Japanese painter (born 1744)
- October 10 – Uragami Gyokudō, Japanese musician, painter, poet and calligrapher (born 1745)
- date unknown
  - Pietro Bonato, Italian painter and engraver (born 1765)
  - Jean Simeon Rousseau de la Rottiere, French decorative painter (born 1747)
  - Quirinus van Amelsfoort, Dutch allegorical, historical and portrait painter (born 1760)
