= Royal Academy Exhibition of 1820 =

1820 art exhibition in London

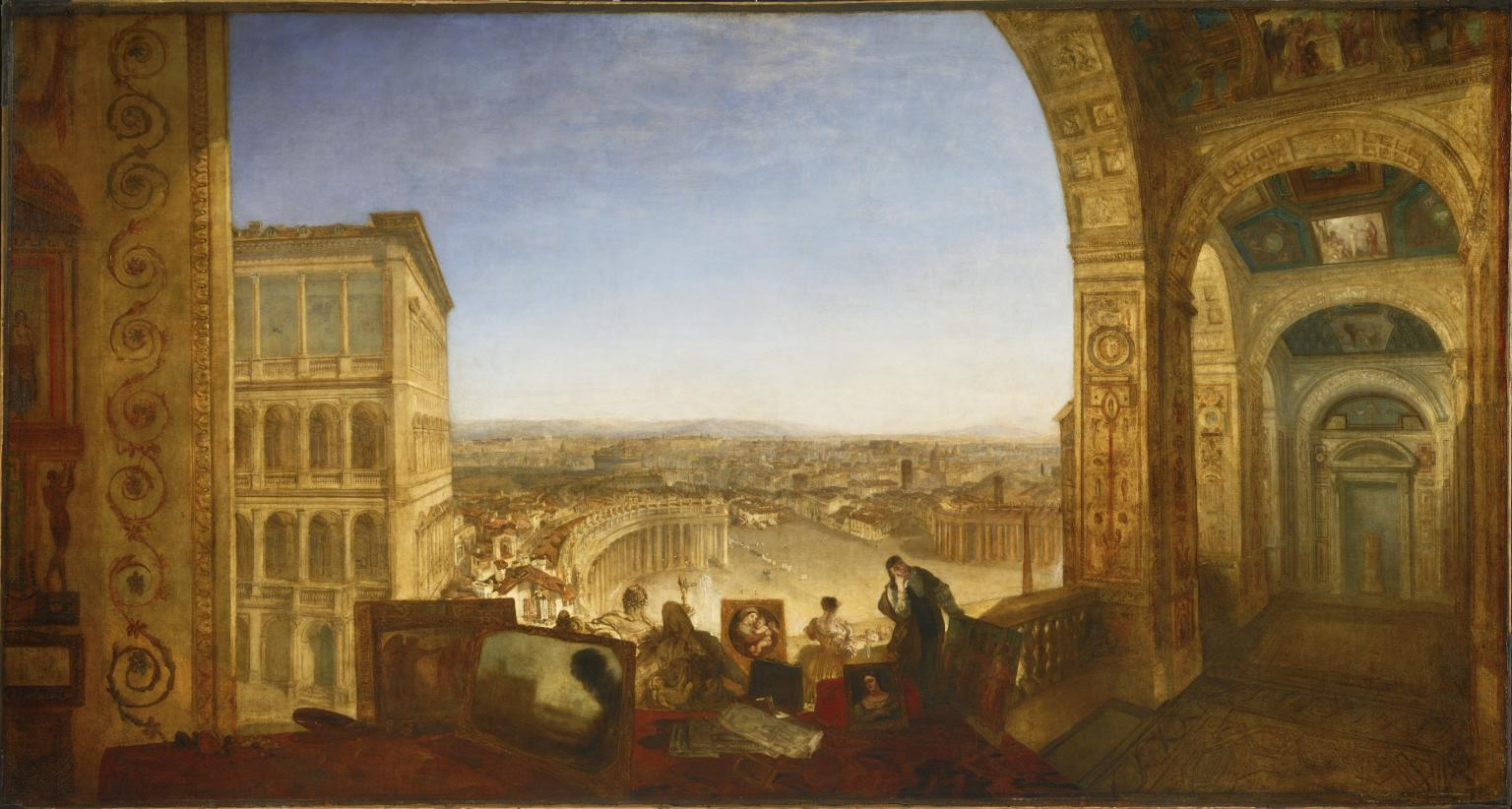
Rome, from the Vatican by J.M.W. Turner

The Royal Academy Exhibition of 1820 was an art exhibition held at Somerset House in London between 1 May and 1 July 1820 during the Regency era. It was the fifty second annual Summer Exhibition of the Royal Academy of Arts featuring more the work of more than five hundred artists, sculptors and architects.

The Exhibition was the first of the reign of George IV, who had been Prince Regent since 1811. The academy was under a new President Thomas Lawrence who on returning to Italy had been overwhelmingly elected to success the veteran American Benjamin West who had died in March.

Lawrence had been to Vienna and Rome as part of a major commission from the Prince Regent to paint leading European figures for what would become the Waterloo Chamber at Windsor Castle. He exhibited two works he has produced on the trip not intended for George IV, a portrait of a member of the Habsburg Dynasty as well as his Portrait of Selina Meade featuring an Irish aristocrat. Thomas Phillips submitted his Portrait of Earl Grey featuring the leader of the opposition Whigs and future Prime Minister.

Like Lawrence, J.M.W. Turner had recently been in Italy. The major result of this visit was his Rome, from the Vatican which combined cityscape and history painting. It shows the Renaissance artist Raphael and his model Margarita Luti against a backdrop of Rome. John Constable exhibited Stratford Mill, one of his "six footers" as well as Harwich Lighthouse, a view on the coast of Essex.

David Wilkie displayed Reading the Will, a genre painting based on a work by Walter Scott and commissioned by Maximilian I, the king of Bavaria. William Hilton exhibited Venus in Search of Cupid Surprises Diana, inspired by The Faerie Queene by Edmund Spenser.

== Gallery ==
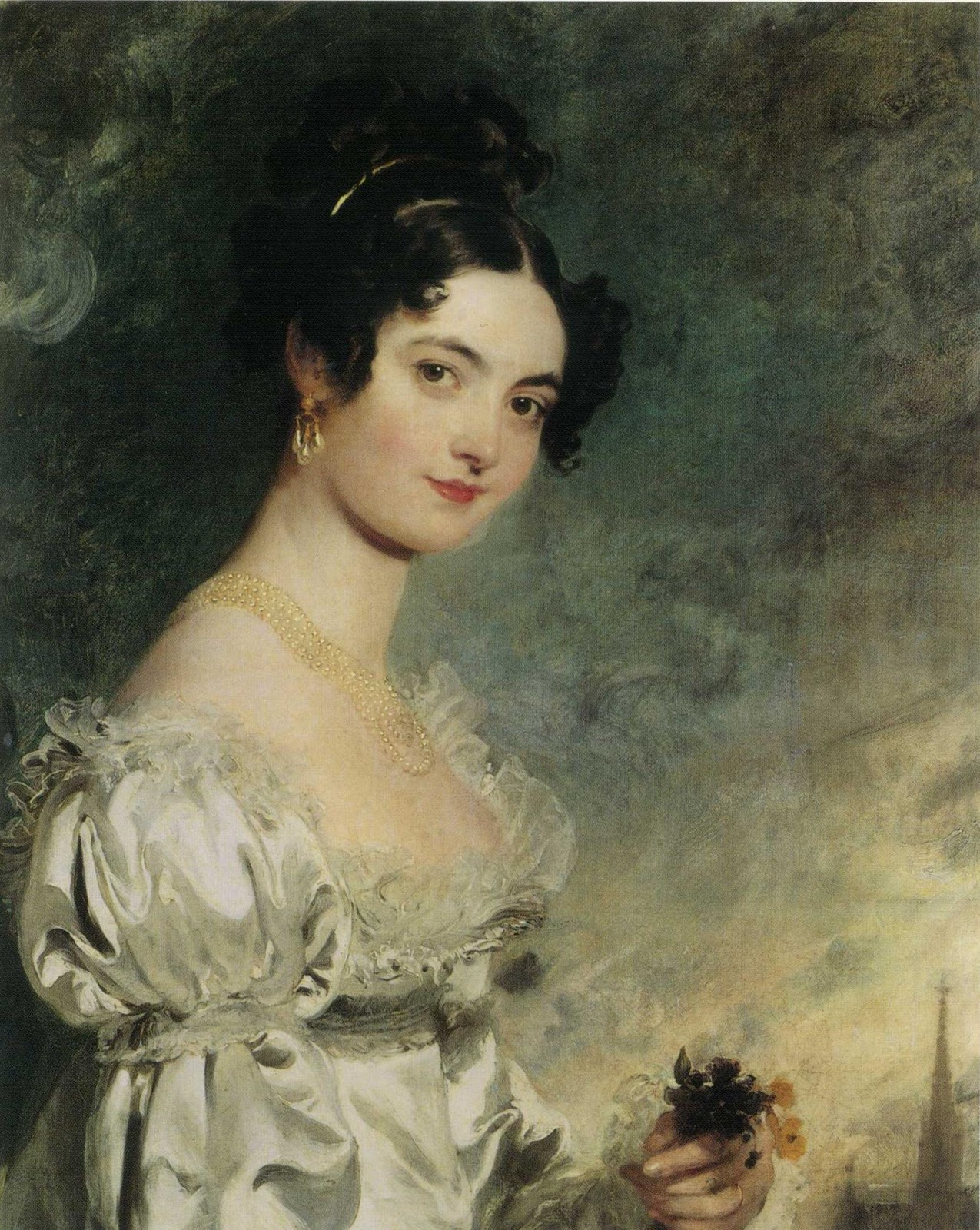
Portrait of Selina Meade by Thomas Lawrence

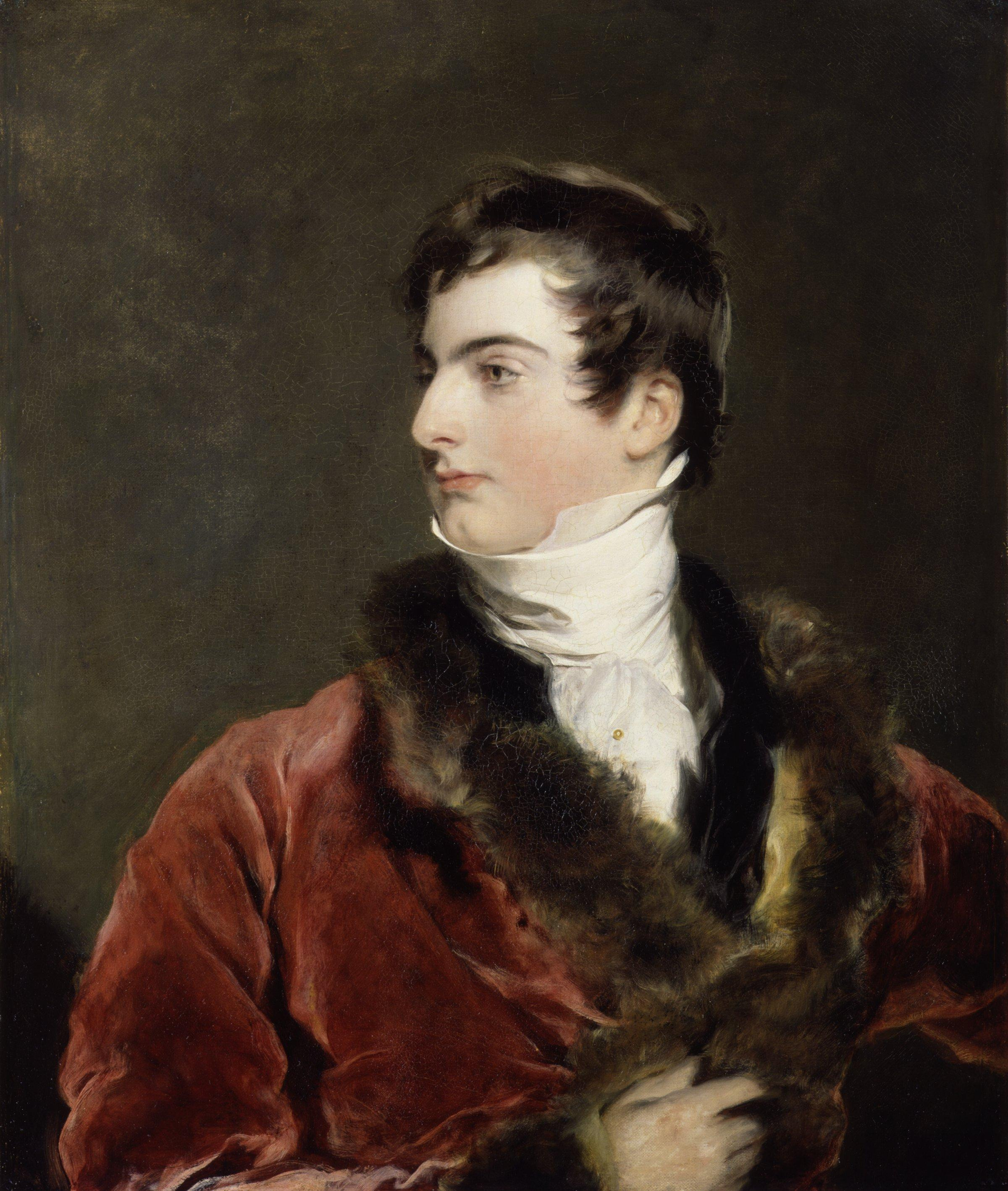
Portrait of Lord Bloomfield by Thomas Lawrence

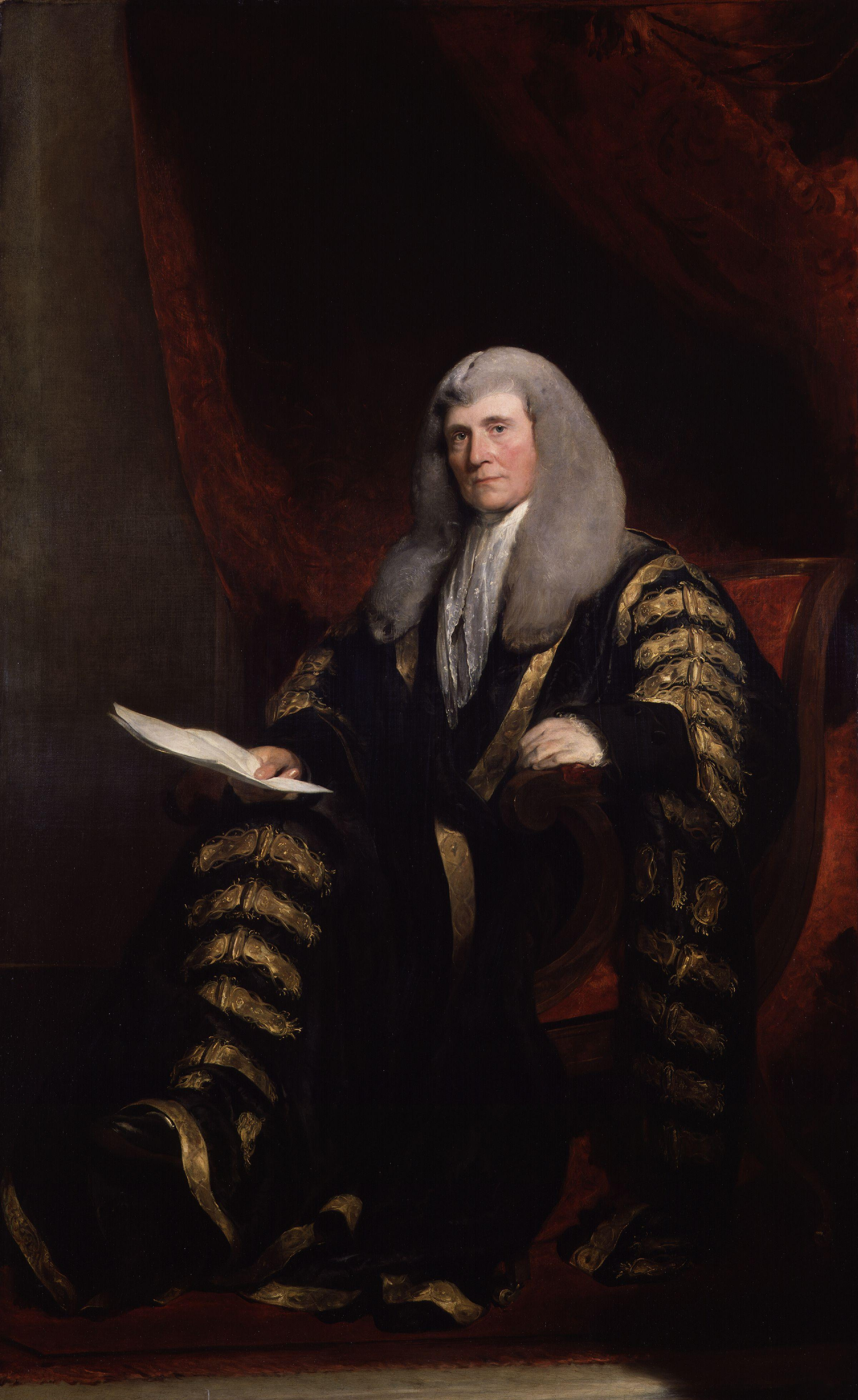
Portrait of William Grant by Thomas Lawrence

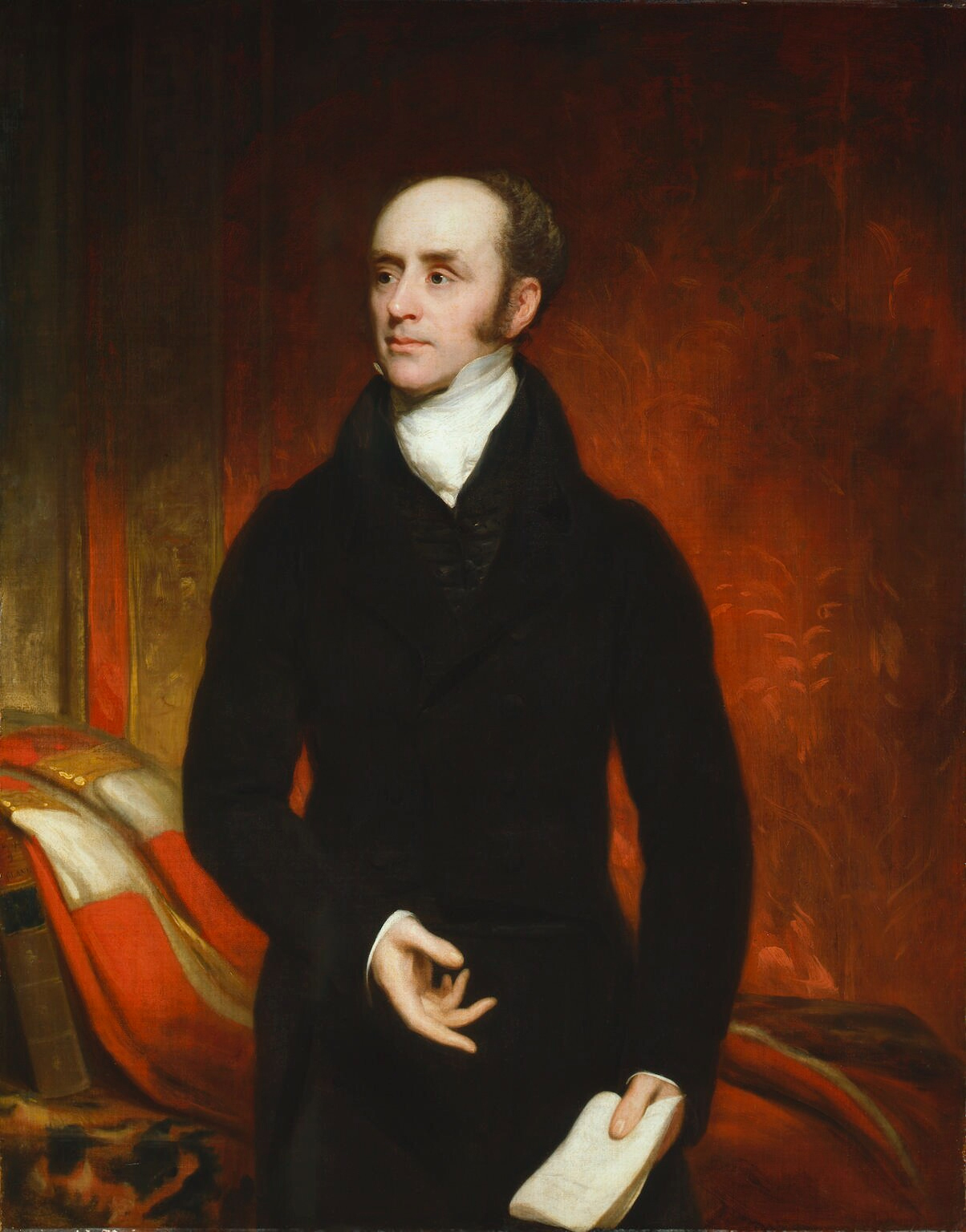
Portrait of Earl Grey by Thomas Phillips

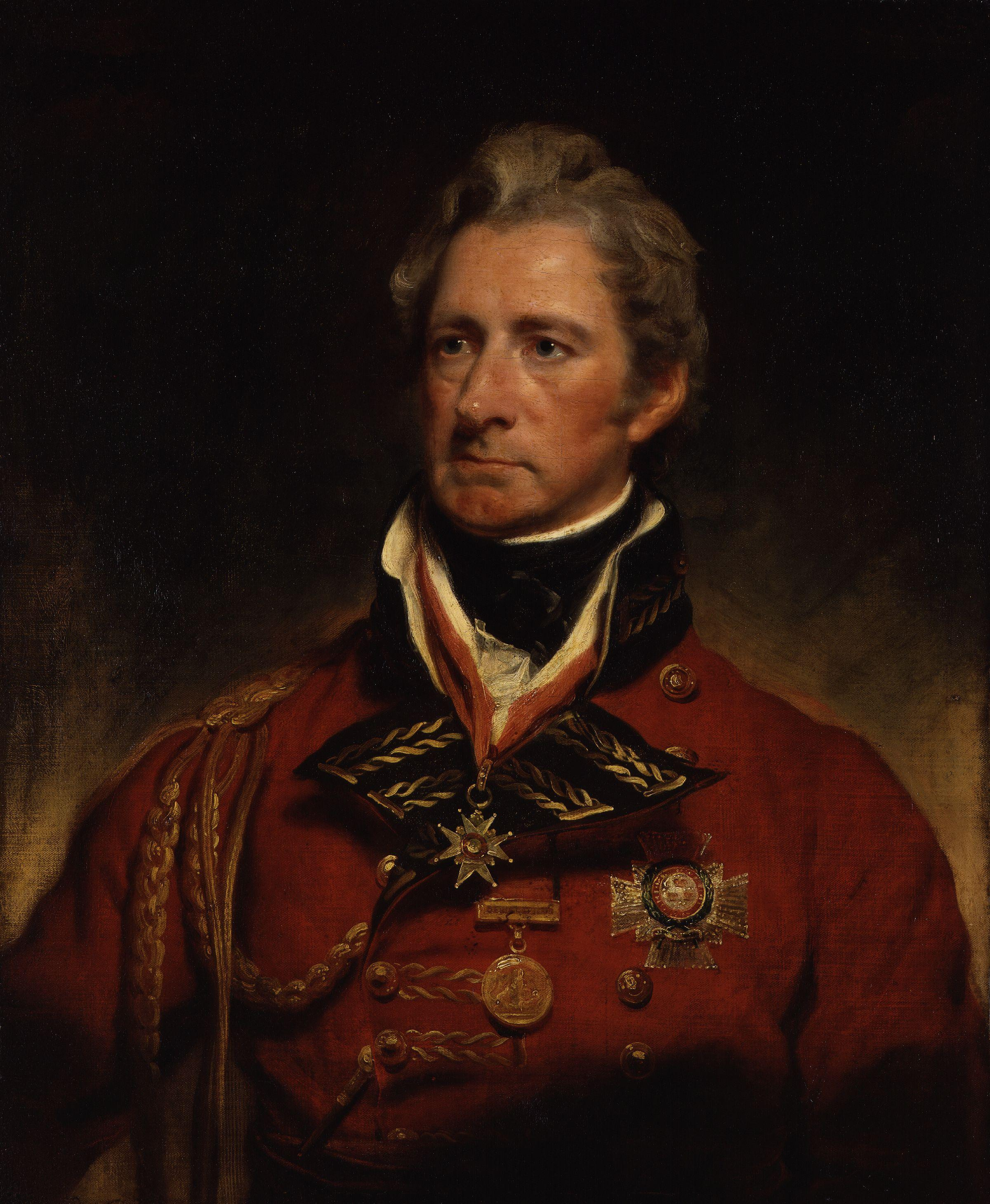
Portrait of Thomas Munro by Martin Archer Shee

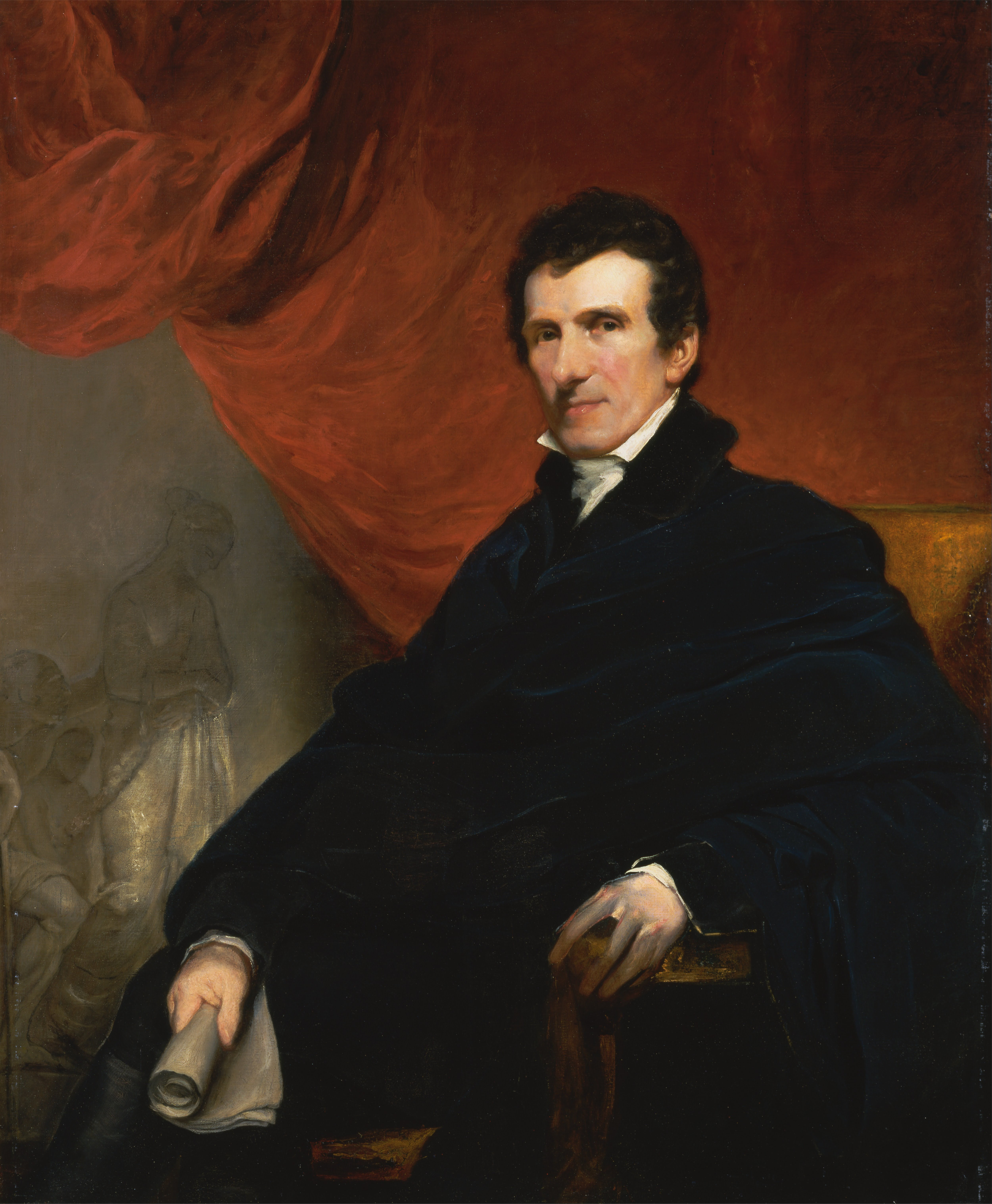
Portrait of Antonio Canova by John Jackson

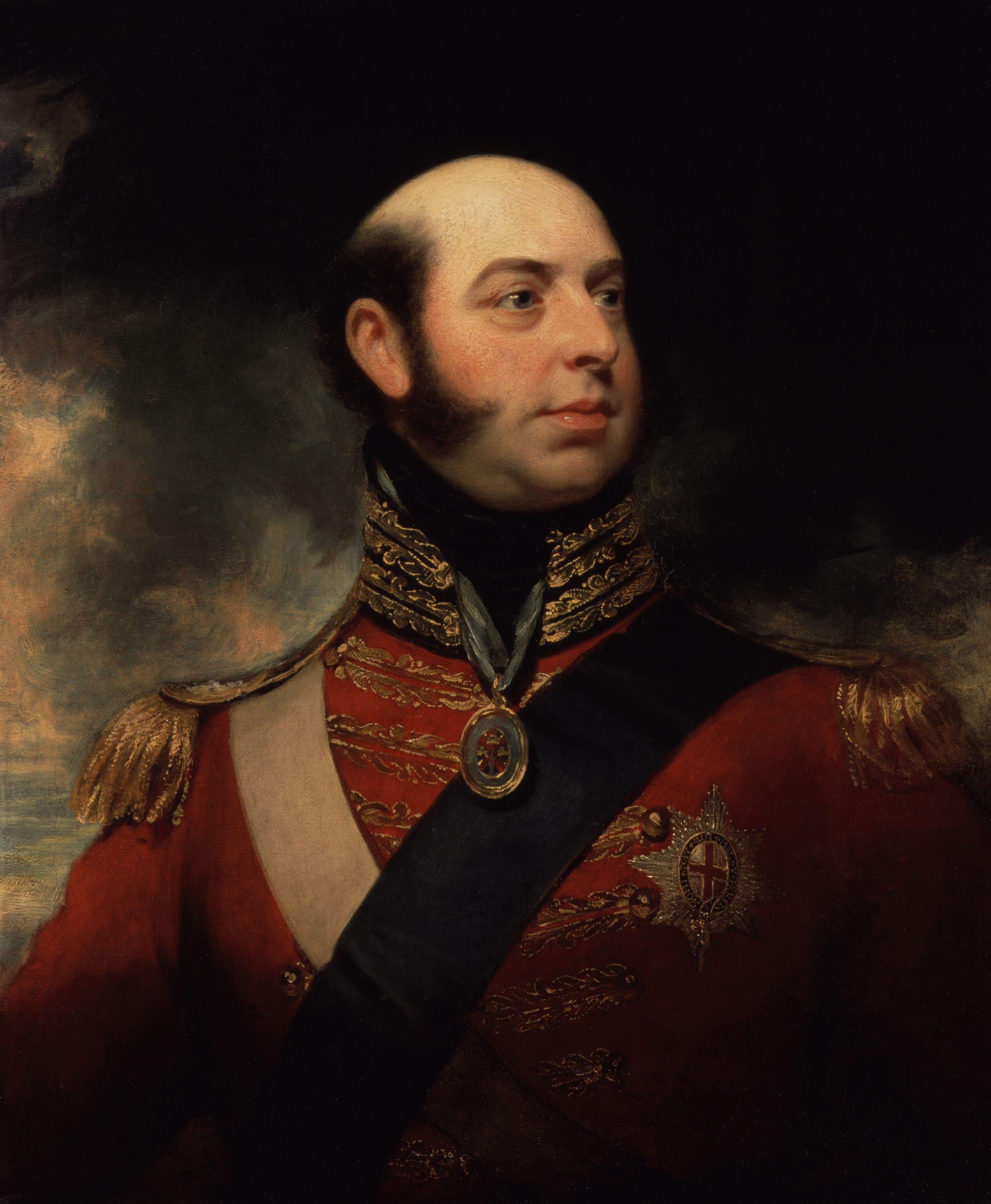
Portrait of the Duke of Kent by William Beechey

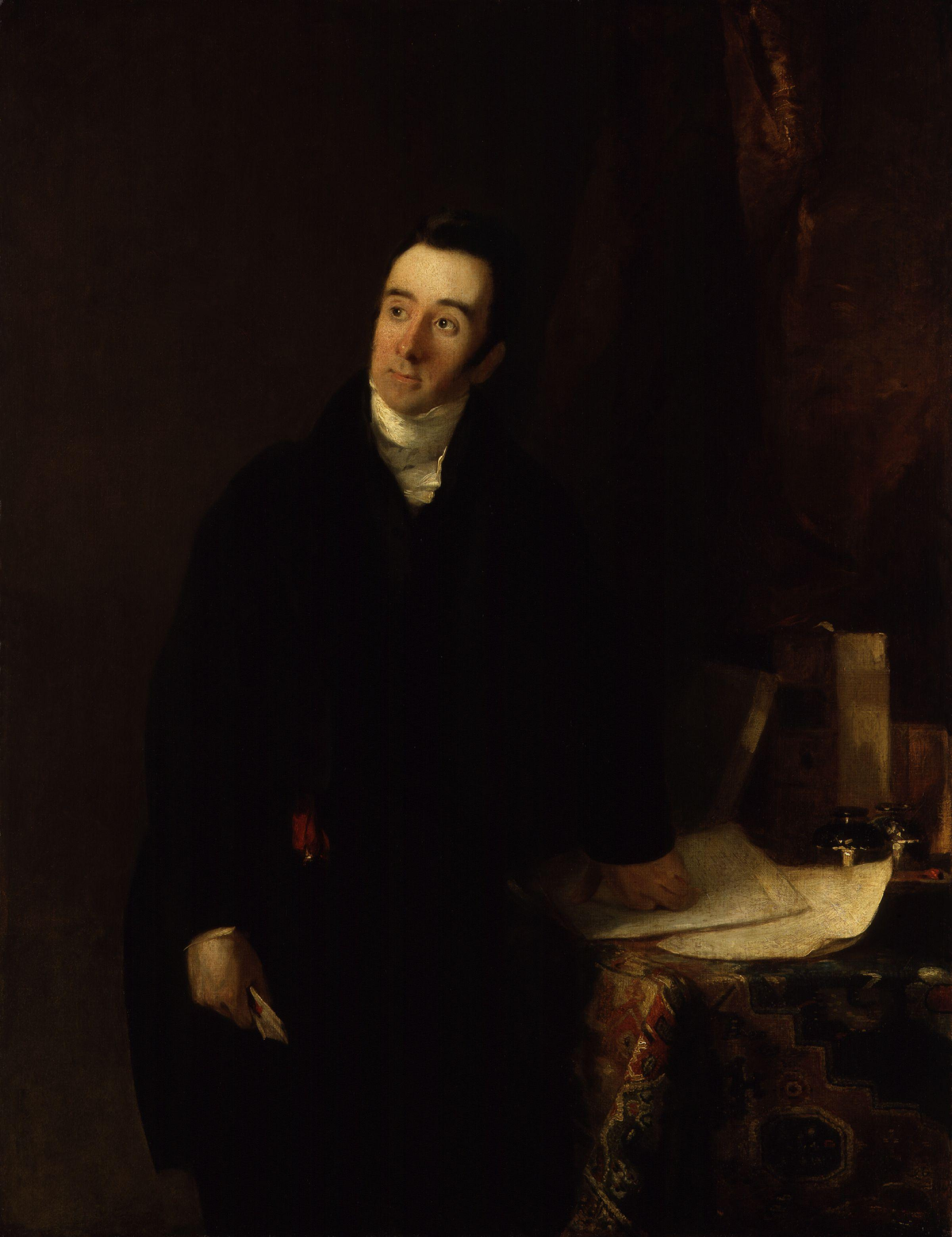
Portrait of Francis Jeffrey by Andrew Geddes

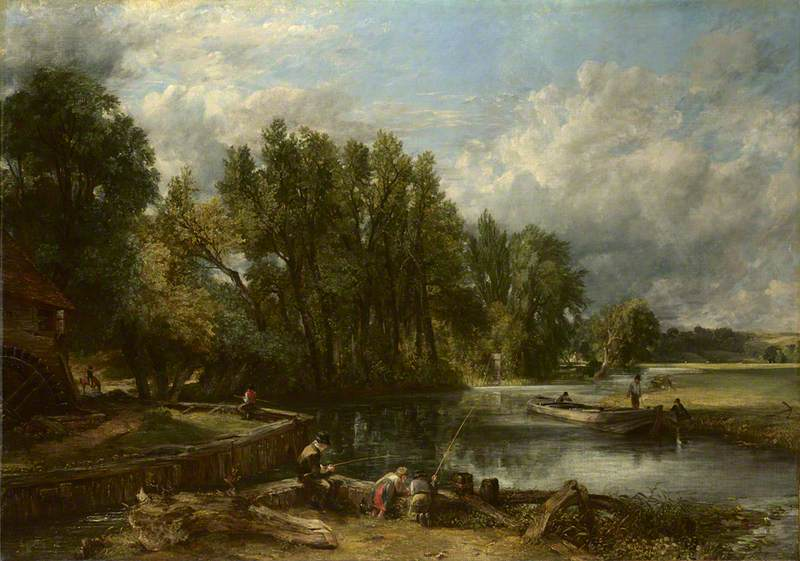
Stratford Mill by John Constable

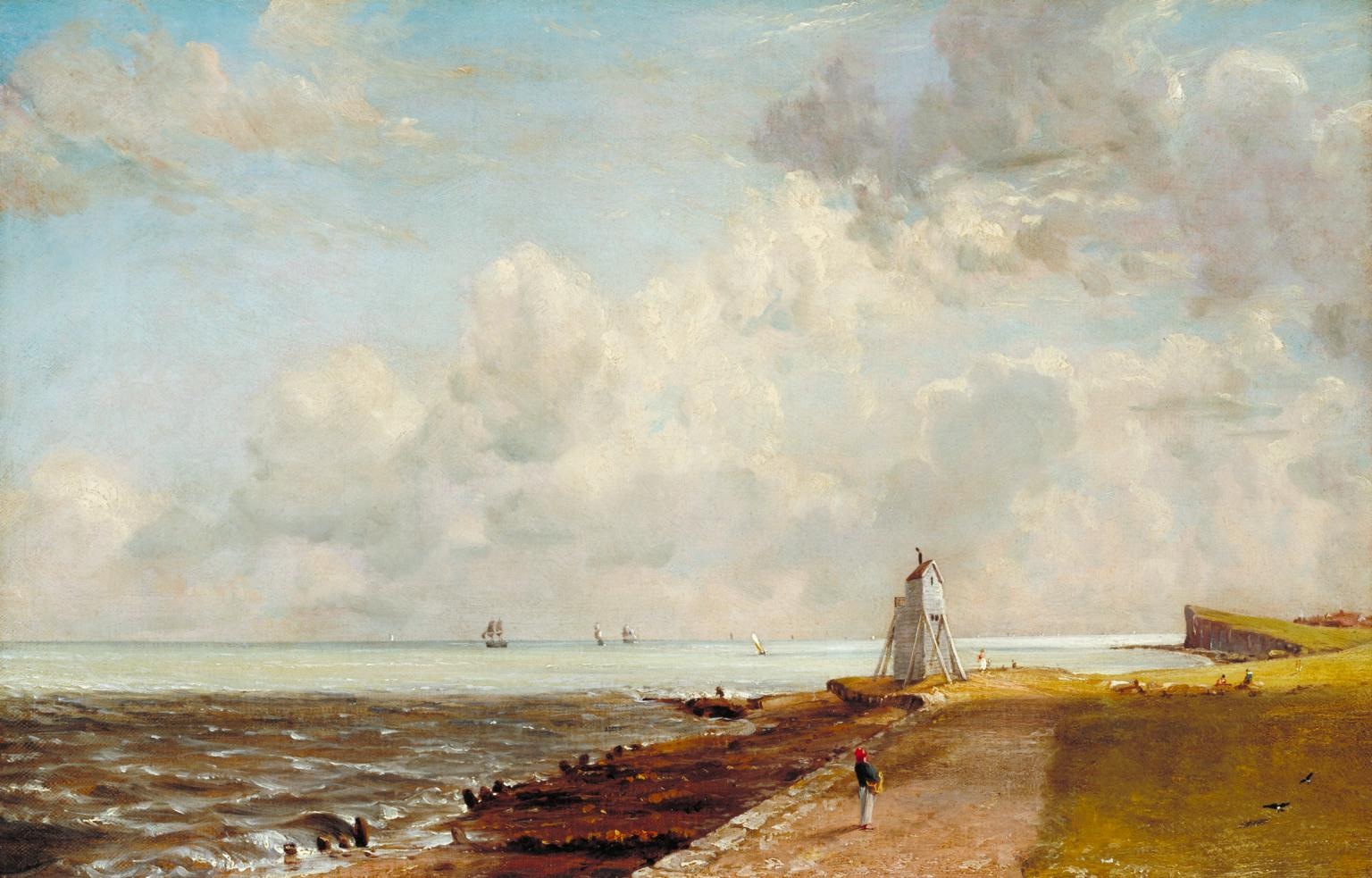
Harwich Lighthouse by John Constable

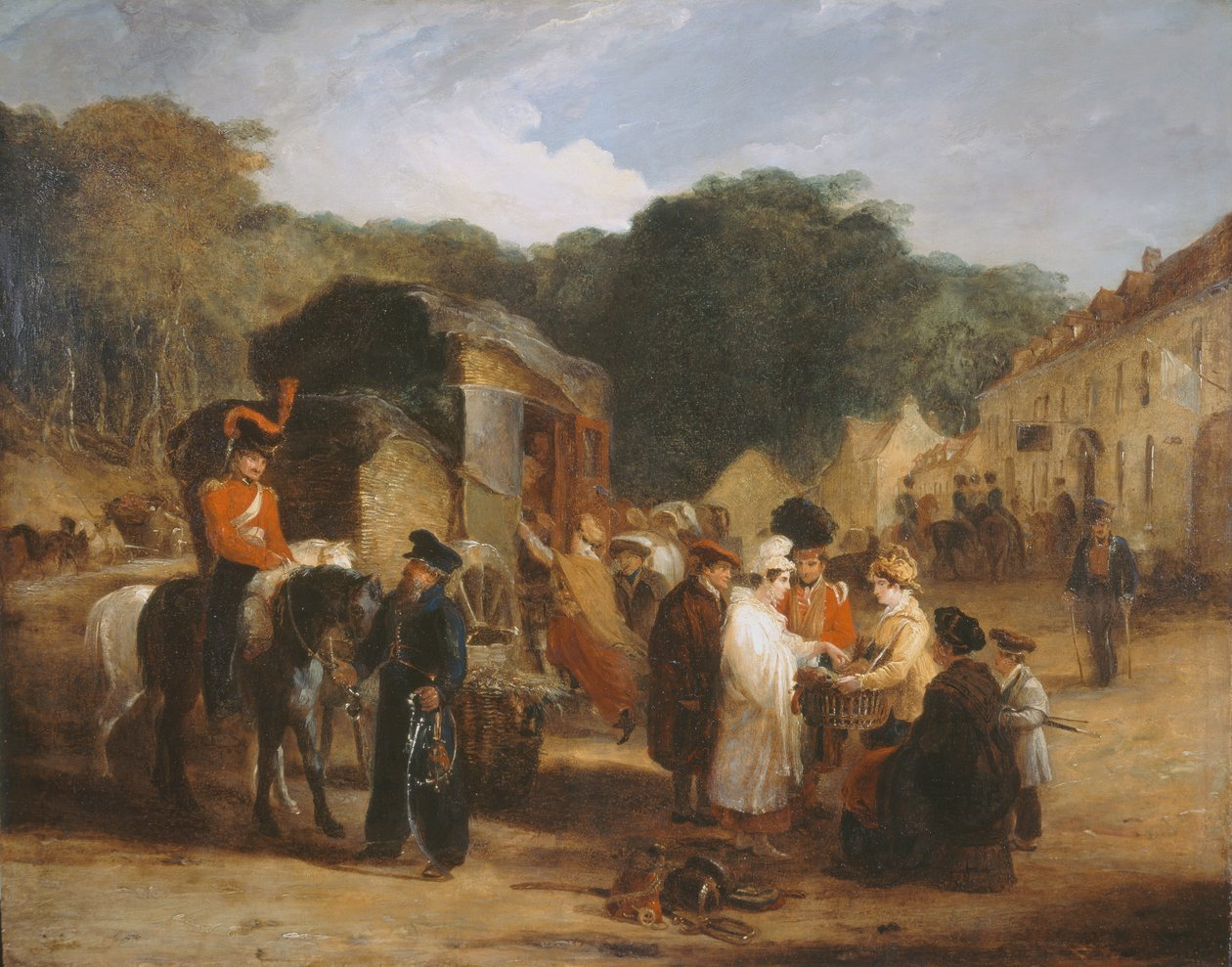
The Village of Waterloo by George Jones

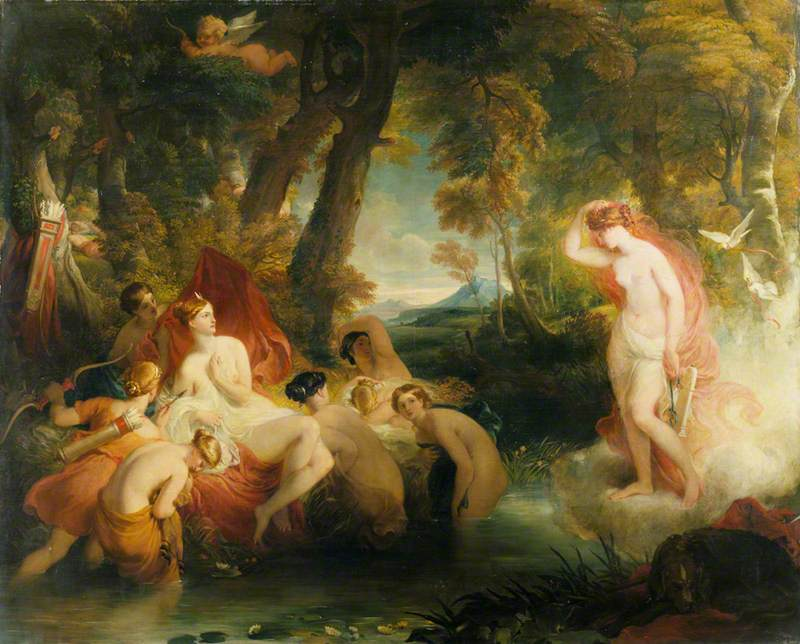
Venus in Search of Cupid Surprises Diana by William Hilton

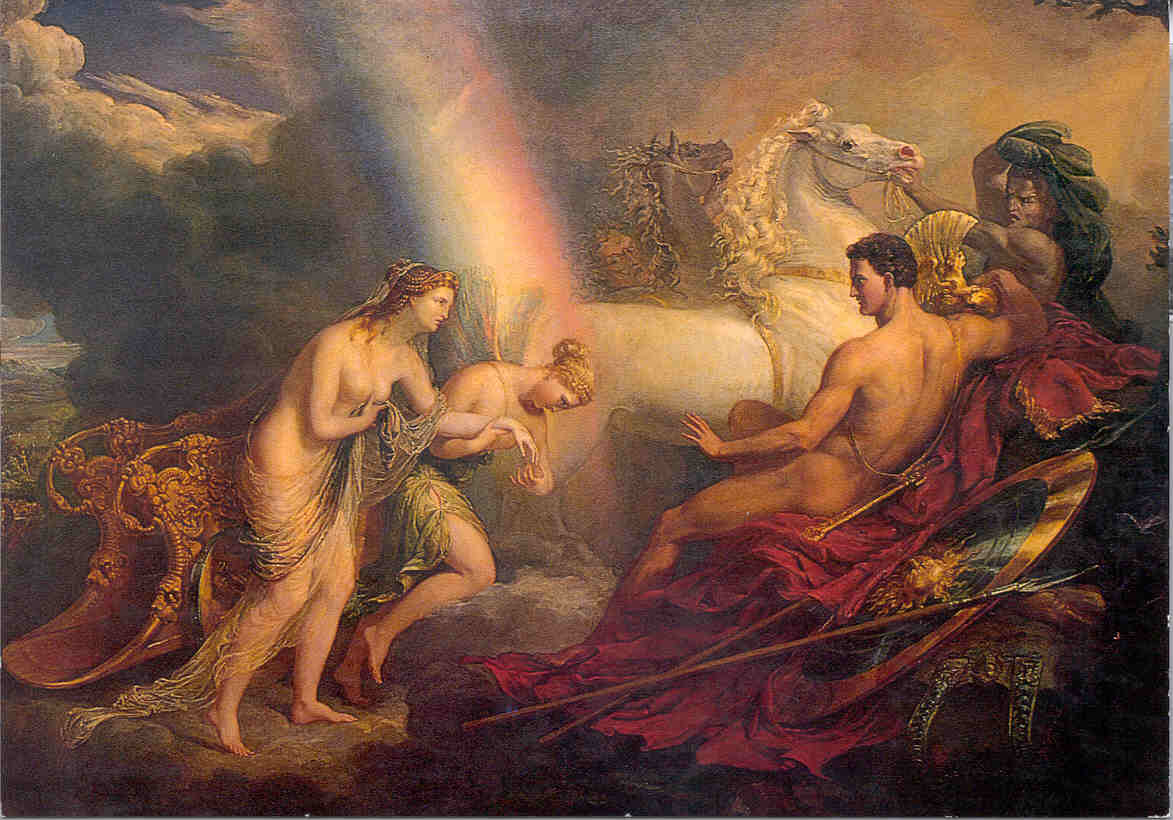
Venus Supported by Iris, Complaining to Mars by George Hayter

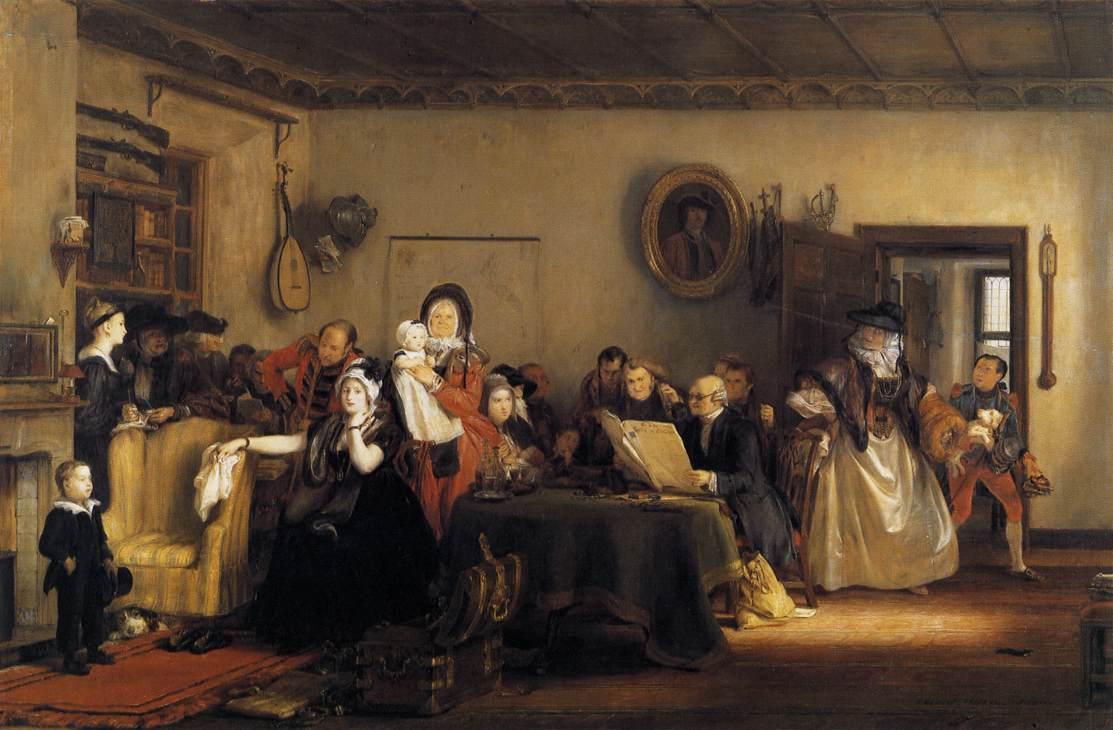
Reading the Will by David Wilkie

Londoners Gypsying by Charles Robert Leslie

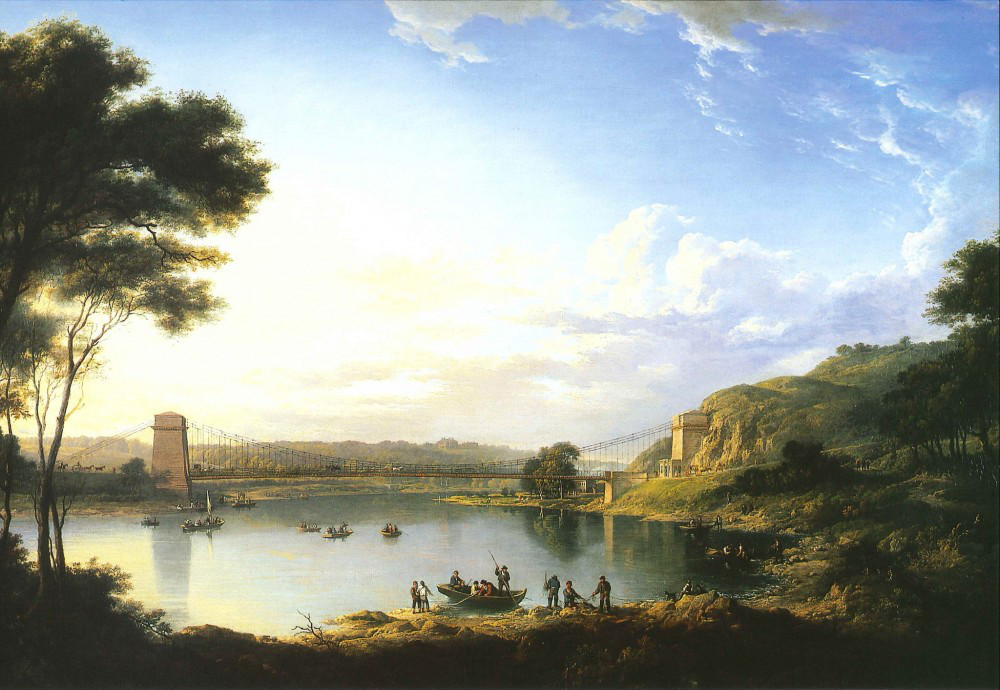
Construction of the Union Bridge over the Tweed by Alexander Nasmyth

Portrait of Edward Bird by Edward Villiers Rippingille

== Bibliography ==
- Albinson, Cassandra, Funnell, Peter & Peltz, Lucy. Thomas Lawrence: Regency Power and Brilliance. Yale University Press, 2010.
- Bailey, Anthony. J.M.W. Turner: Standing in the Sun. Tate Enterprises Ltd, 2013.
- Hamilton, James. Turner - A Life. Sceptre, 1998.
- Levey, Michael. Sir Thomas Lawrence. Yale University Press, 2005.
- Thornes, John E. John Constable's Skies: A Fusion of Art and Science. A&C Black, 1999.
- Tromans, Nicholas. David Wilkie: The People's Painter. Edinburgh University Press, 2007.
