= Louis XVIII Raising France from Its Ruins =

Painting by Louis-Philippe Crépin

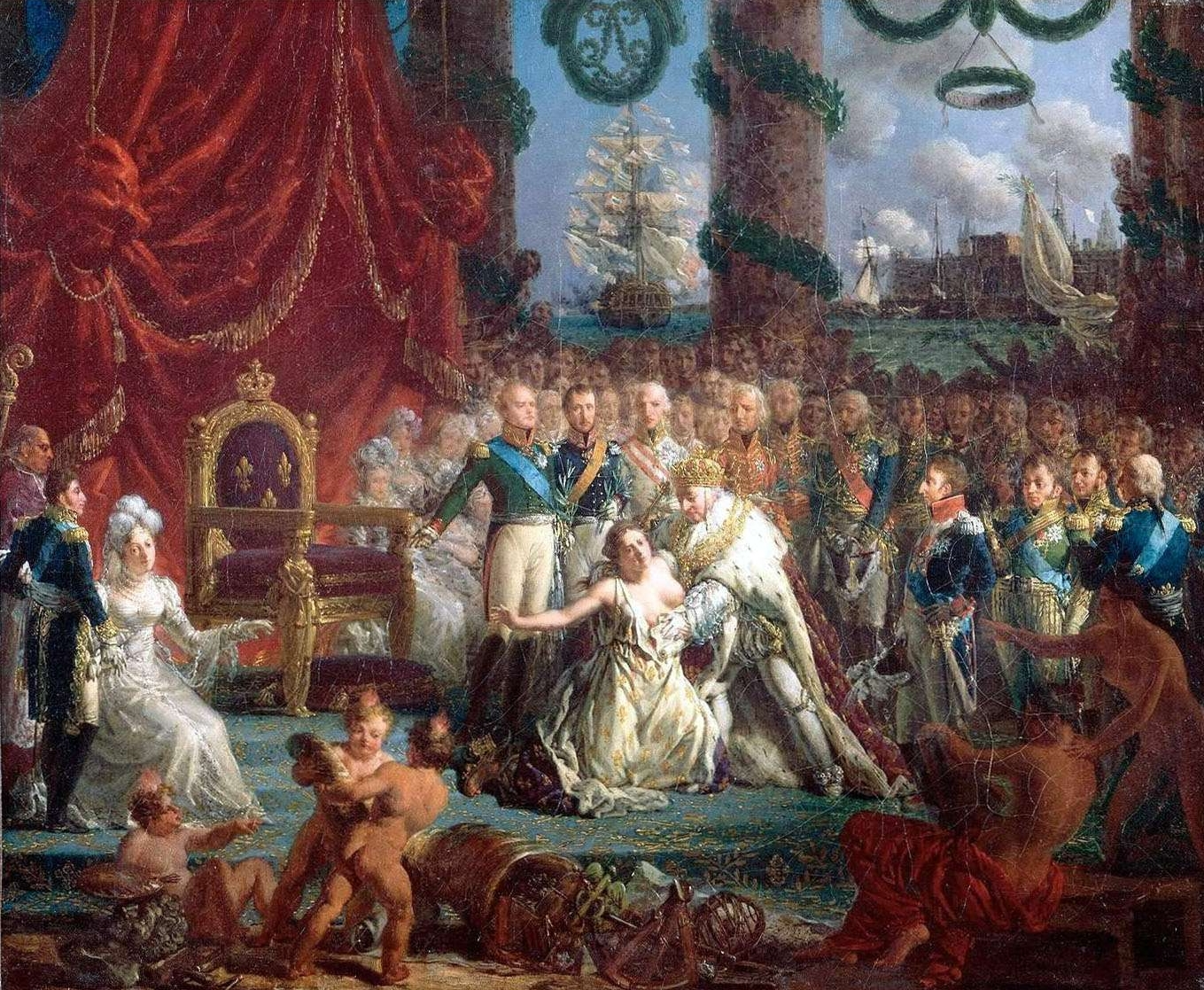
- Artist: Louis-Philippe Crépin
- Year: 1814
- Type: Oil on canvas, history painting
- Dimensions: 46 cm × 55 cm (18 in × 22 in)
- Location: Palace of Versailles; Versailles

Louis XVIII Raising France from Its Ruins (French: Louis XVIII relevant la France de ses ruines) is an 1814 history painting by the French artist Louis-Philippe Crépin. In allegorical form it depicts the Restoration of the Bourbon Dynasty following the abdication of Napoleon. Louis XVIII, who was returning from exile in Britain, arrived at the port of Calais on 24 April 1814. France is personified by a kneeling topless woman whose gown is covered with Fleur-de-lis while the king is shown wearing a crown and ceremonial robes.

Other members of the Bourbon family are present including the king's brother the Count of Artois and his sons the Duke of Angoulême and the Duke of Berry as well as his daughter-in-law Marie Thérèse of France. Also present is the politician Talleyrand. The painting was displayed at the Salon of 1814 held at the Louvre in Paris. Today it is in the collection of the Palace of Versailles, having been acquired in 1986.

== See also ==
- The Arrival of King Louis XVIII of France at Calais, an 1816 painting by Edward Bird

== Bibliography ==
- Crow, Thomas. Restoration: The Fall of Napoleon in the Course of European Art, 1812-1820. Princeton University Press, 2023.
- Price, Munro. The Perilous Crown: France Between Revolutions, 1814-1848. Pan Macmillan, 2010.
