= The Embarkation of Louis XVIII at Dover =

Painting by Edward Bird

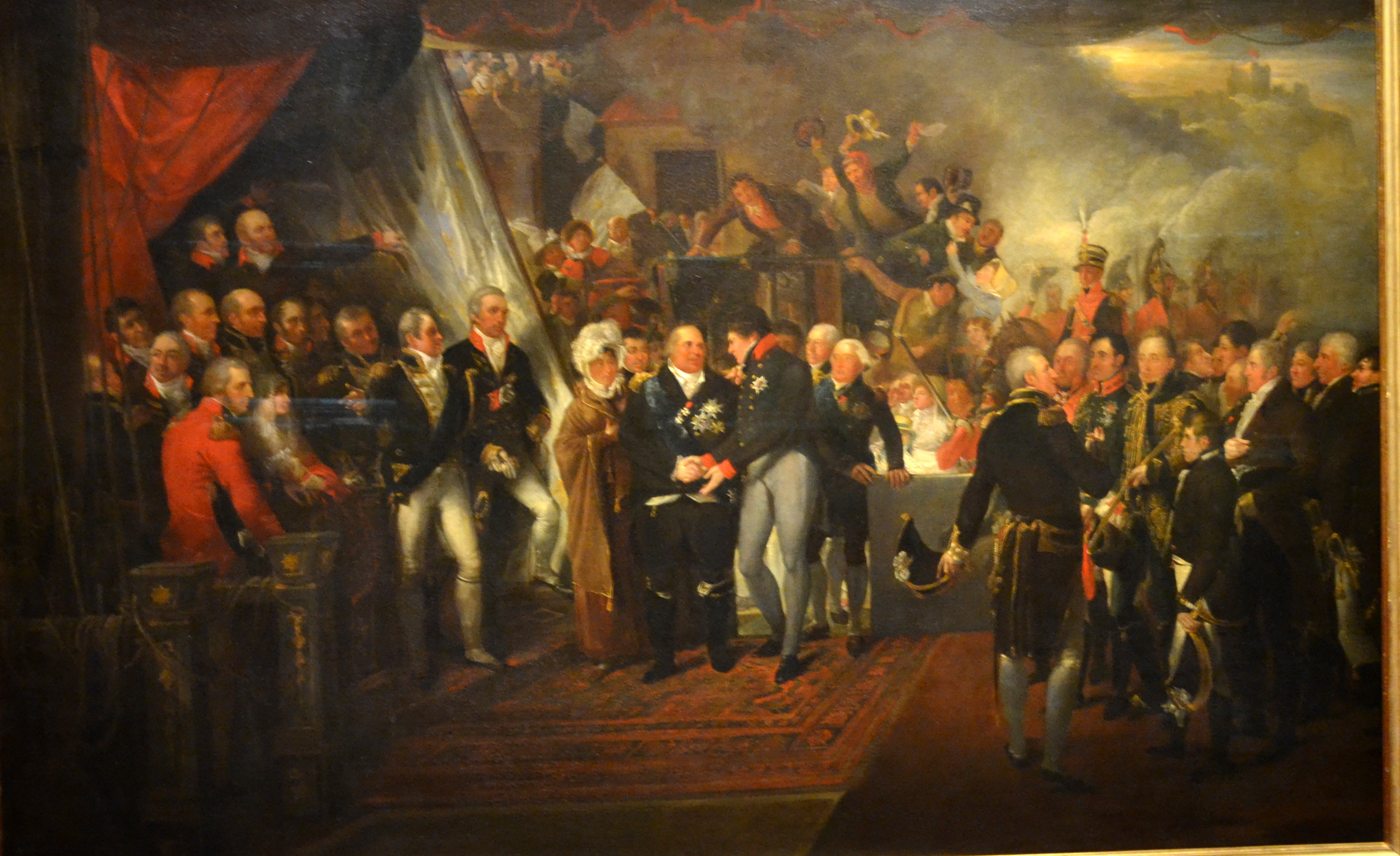
- Artist: Edward Bird
- Year: 1816
- Type: Oil on panel, history painting
- Dimensions: 109.5 cm × 172.7 cm (43.1 in × 68.0 in)
- Location: City Museum and Art Gallery; Bristol

The Embarkation of Louis XVIII at Dover is an oil on panel history painting by the English artist Edward Bird, from 1816. It is held at the City Museum and Art Gallery.

== History and description ==
It depicts the departure of Louis XVIII from Dover, in Kent, on 24 April 1814. After many years in exile during the Napoleonic Wars, he was returning to his native country on the British royal yacht following the victory of the Allies in the War of the Sixth Coalition that led to the abdication of Napoleon. The Royal Sovereign flew the flag of the Bourbon Dynasty during the trip, and the journey drew comparisons to the English Restoration of Charles II in 1660.

Bird was a member of the Bristol School. During the Regency era he had achieved popularity for his genre paintings and Prince Regent had bought his 1810 work The Village Choristers. He received permission to travel on the Royal Yacht and sketch the various figures onboard. At the centre of the composition is Louis standing beside the British Regent. Bird also produced a companion piece, The Arrival of King Louis XVIII of France at Calais. By the time the paintings were completed Napoleon had escaped from Elba and been defeated in the Waterloo Campaign of 1815. A second restoration had taken place to restore Louis to the throne.

Bird's hopes that the Prince Regent might purchase the painting were disappointed. Today the painting is in the collection of the City Museum and Art Gallery, having been acquired in 1971.

== Bibliography ==
- Lavery, Brian. Royal Yachts Under Sail. Seaforth Publishing, 2022.
- Richardson, Sarah. Edward Bird, 1772-1819. Wolverhampton Art Gallery, 1982.
- Wright, Christopher, Gordon, Catherine May & Smith, Mary Peskett. British and Irish Paintings in Public Collections: An Index of British and Irish Oil Paintings by Artists Born Before 1870 in Public and Institutional Collections in the United Kingdom and Ireland. Yale University Press, 2006.
