= Reading the Will =

Painting by David Wilkie

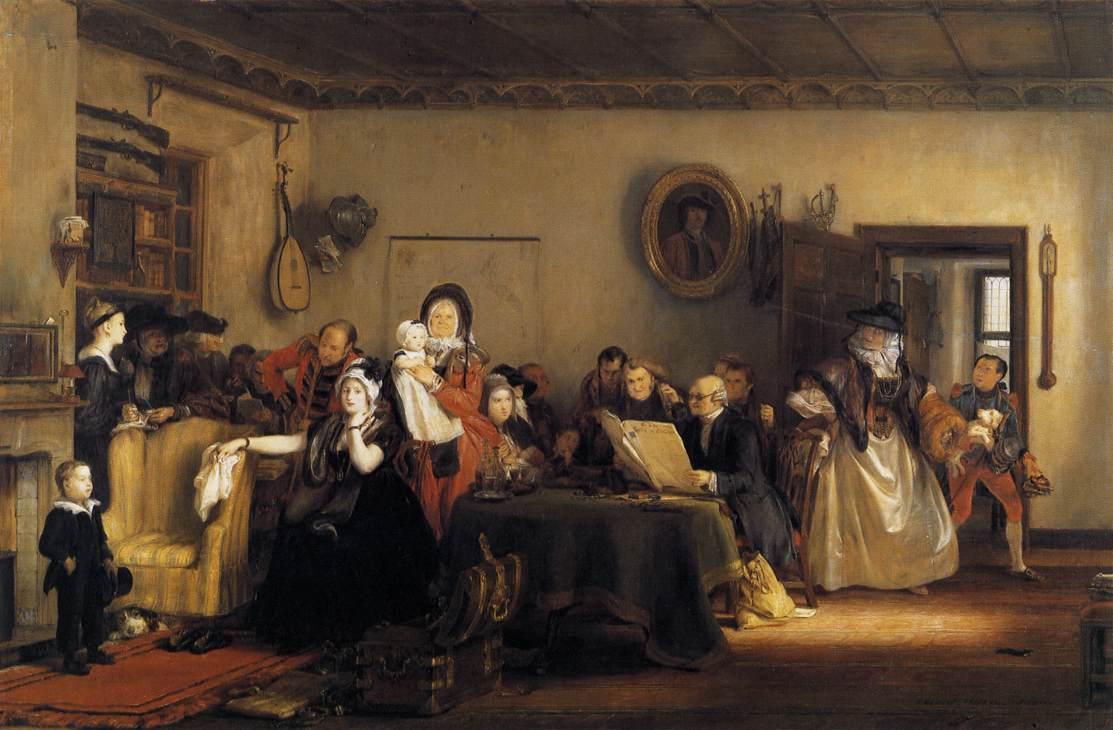
- Artist: David Wilkie
- Year: 1820
- Type: Oil on panel
- Dimensions: 76 cm × 115 cm (30 in × 45 in)
- Location: Neue Pinakothek, Munich

Reading the Will is an 1820 genre painting by the British artist David Wilkie. It is inspired by a scene from the 1815 novel Guy Mannering the Waverley series by Walter Scott although this was not widely appreciated by contemporary critics.

The painting was commissioned by Maximilian I of Bavaria. It was displayed at the Royal Academy Exhibition of 1820 at Somerset House in London. Today it is in the collection of the Neue Pinakothek in Munich.

== See also ==
- The Reading of the Will Concluded, an 1811 painting of a similar theme by Edward Bird

== Bibliography ==
- Macmillan, Duncan. Scottish Art, 1460-2000. Mainstream Publishing, 2000.
- Tromans, Nicholas. David Wilkie: The People's Painter. Edinburgh University Press, 2007.
