= The Arrival of King Louis XVIII of France at Calais =

Painting by Edward Bird

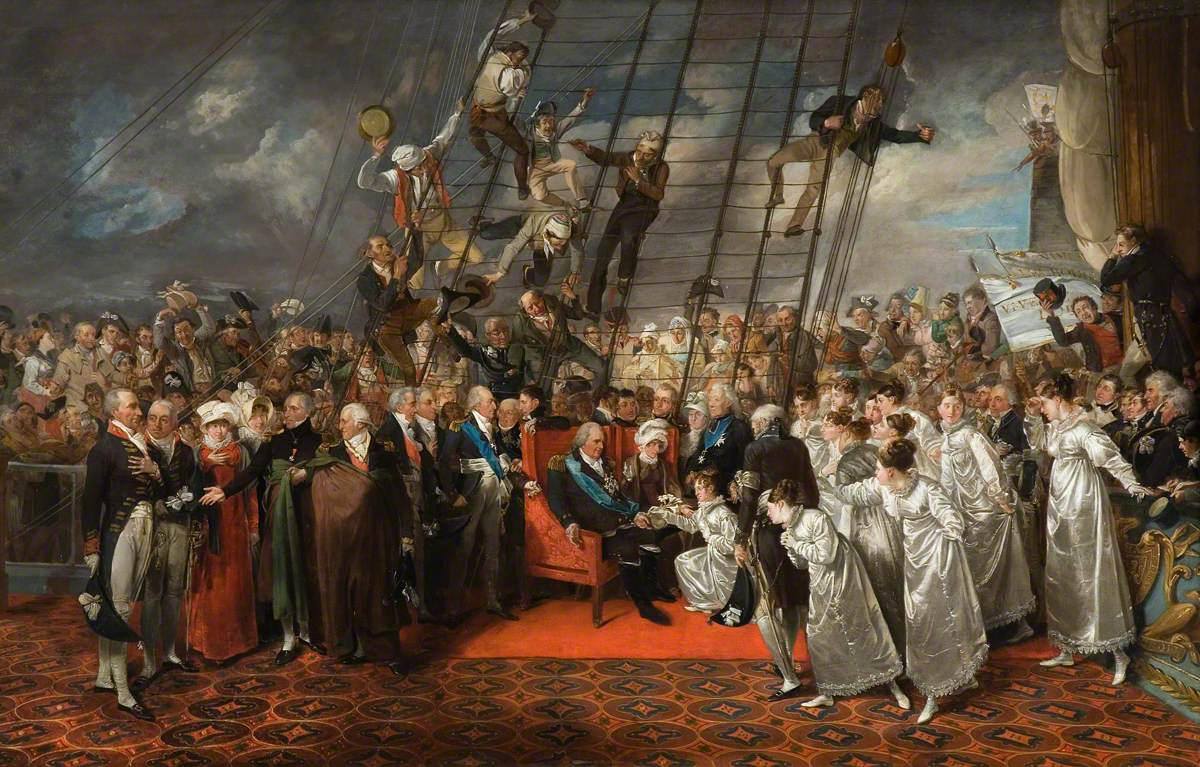
- Artist: Edward Bird
- Year: 1816
- Type: Oil on panel, history painting
- Dimensions: 110 cm × 174 cm (43 in × 69 in)
- Location: Wolverhampton Art Gallery, Wolverhampton

The Arrival of King Louis XVIII of France at Calais is an oil on canvas history painting by the English artist Edward Bird, from 1816.

== History and description ==
It depicts the arrival of Louis XVIII, the long-exiled claimant to the throne of France, arriving in Calais, on 24 April 1814, following the downfall of Napoleon. Louis, the younger brother of the guillotined Louis XVI, had spent the later stages of the Napoleonic Wars in exile in Regency Britain. The First Bourbon Restoration proved to be short-lived as Napoleon escaped from Elba in 1815. It was a companion piece to The Embarkation of Louis XVIII at Dover, which shows the beginning of the voyage.

Bird was a founder of the Bristol School and in 1815 was elected a member of the Royal Academy. He was known for his genre paintings, but his career ended in bankruptcy, and his early death in 1819. The painting is in the collection of the Wolverhampton Art Gallery, which purchased it in 1935. Another version is on display at Burton Constable Hall, in Yorkshire.

== See also ==
- Louis XVIII Raising France from Its Ruins, an 1814 painting by Louis-Philippe Crépin featuring an allegorical depiction of the king's arrival at Calais

== Bibliography ==
- Greenacre, Francis. The Bristol School of Artists: Francis Danby and Painting in Bristol, 1810-1840. City Art Gallery, 1973.
- Richardson, Sarah. Edward Bird, 1772-1819. Wolverhampton Art Gallery, 1982.
- Roe, Sonia & Ellis, Andrew. Oil Paintings in Public Ownership in Staffordshire. Public Catalogue Foundation, 2007.
- Wright, Christopher, Gordon, Catherine May & Smith, Mary Peskett. British and Irish Paintings in Public Collections: An Index of British and Irish Oil Paintings by Artists Born Before 1870 in Public and Institutional Collections in the United Kingdom and Ireland. Yale University Press, 2006.
