= The Reading of the Will Concluded =

Painting by Edward Bird

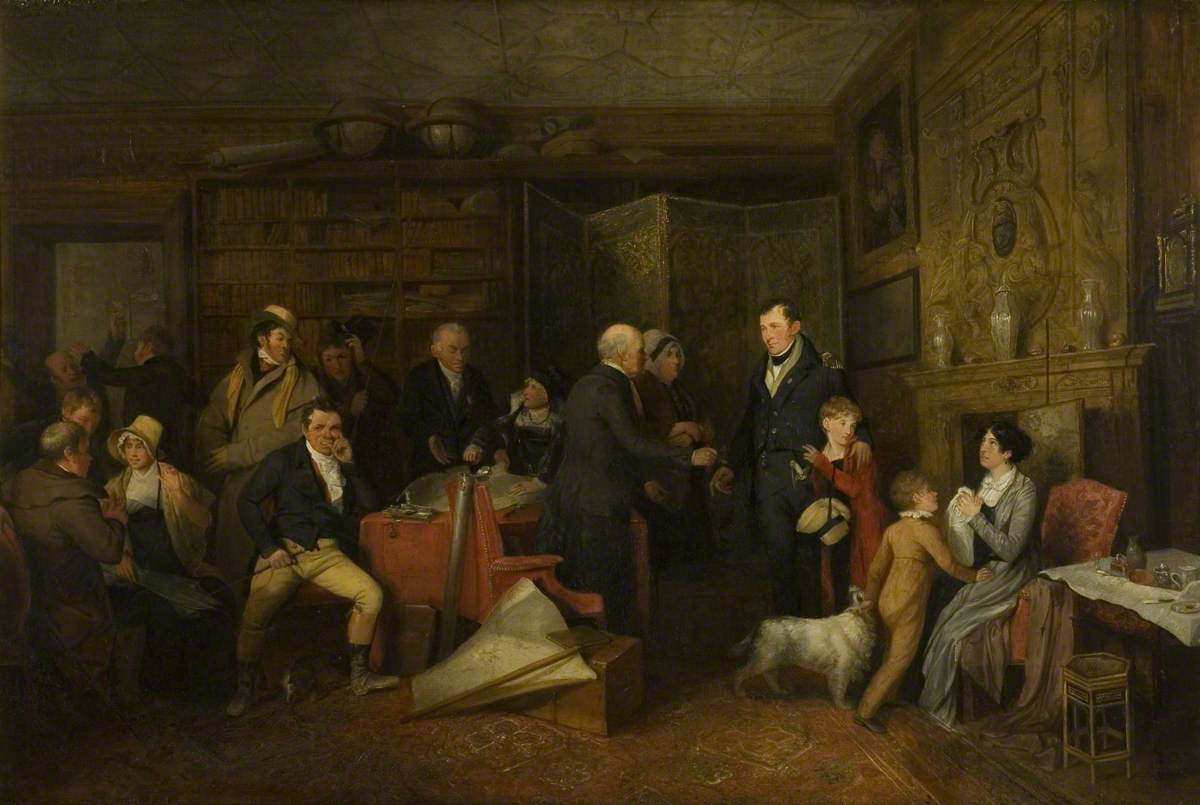
- Artist: Edward Bird
- Year: 1811
- Type: Oil on panel, genre painting
- Dimensions: 62.2 cm × 97.7 cm (24.5 in × 38.5 in)
- Location: City Museum and Art Gallery, Bristol

'The Reading of the Will Concluded is an oil on panel genre painting by the English artist Edward Bird, from 1811. It is held at the Bristol City Museum and Art Gallery.

== History and description ==
It features a group scene following the death of an wealthy old bachelor. His various relatives have all gathered hoping for a slice of his wealth. However, he appears to have named a modest Royal Navy officer as his heir to the irritation of others present.

Genre scenes depicting ordinary life were popular during the Regency era. Bird was a member of the Bristol School of artists, influencing followers such as Francis Danby. The picture was displayed at the Royal Academy Exhibition of 1811 at Somerset House. The painting is in the collection of the Bristol City Museum and Art Gallery, having been acquired in 1917.

== See also ==
- Reading the Will, an 1820 painting by David Wilkie

== Bibliography ==
- Byrde, Penelope. Nineteenth Century Fashion. Batsford, 1992.
- Carter, Julia. Bristol Museum and Art Gallery: Guide to the Art Collection. Bristol Books, 2017.
- Greenacre, Francis. The Bristol School of Artists: Francis Danby and Painting in Bristol, 1810-1840. City Art Gallery, 1973.
- Richardson, Sarah. Edward Bird, 1772-1819. Wolverhampton Art Gallery, 1982.
