= Londoners Gypsying =

Painting by Charles Robert Leslie

- Artist: Charles Robert Leslie
- Year: 1820
- Type: Oil on Canvas, genre painting
- Dimensions: 81.5 cm × 98.5 cm (32.1 in × 38.8 in)
- Location: Museum of the Home, London

Londoners Gypsying is an oil on canvas genre painting by the British-American artist Charles Robert Leslie, from 1820. It depicts a family of Londoners enjoying a picnic in Epping Forest. It reflects the common usage of the term "gypsyng" in the early nineteenth century to refer to outdoor leisure activities in imitation of gypsy culture. It was displayed at the Royal Academy Exhibition of 1820 at Somerset House. Today is in the Museum of the Home, in London, having been acquired in 1976.

== Bibliography ==
- Byrde, Penelope. Nineteenth Century Fashion. Batsford, 1992.
- Galinou, Mireille & Hayes, John. London in Paint: Oil Paintings in the Collection at the Museum of London. The Museum, 1996.
- Matthews, Jodie. The Gypsy Woman: Representations in Literature and Visual Culture. Bloomsbury Publishing, 2020.
