= The Village Choristers =

Painting by Edward Bird

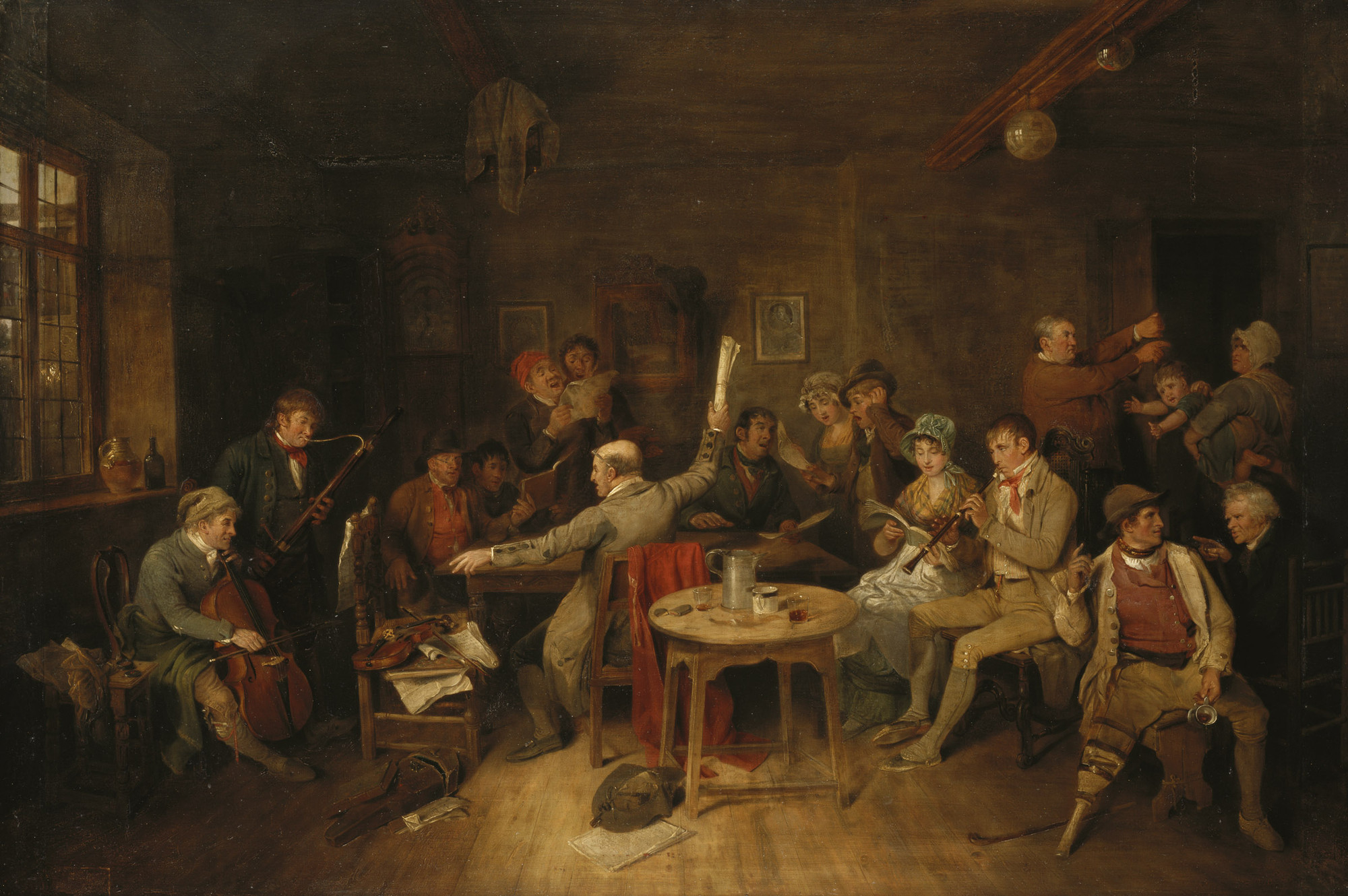
- Artist: Edward Bird
- Year: 1810
- Type: Oil on panel, genre painting
- Dimensions: 63.1 cm × 92.8 cm (24.8 in × 36.5 in)
- Location: Royal Collection

The Village Choristers is an oil on panel genre painting by the English artist Edward Bird, from 1810. It is held in the Royal Collection.

== History and description ==
It depicts the choir of an English village rehearsing hymns for the Sunday service. Inspired by the genre works on the Dutch Old Masters, Bird portrays them in the village tavern. It is also known as The Country Choristers.

The painting was purchased for 250 guineas by George, Prince of Wales, after seeing it at the Royal Academy's Summer Exhibition of 1810. He made the acquisition on the advice of the President of the Royal Academy, Benjamin West, then commissioned the Scottish painter David Wilkie to produce a companion piece, Blind-Man's Buff, to accompany it at his residence in Carlton House.

== Bibliography ==
- Herrmann, Luke. Nineteenth Century British Painting. Charles de la Mare, 2000.
- Richardson, Sarah. Edward Bird, 1772-1819. Wolverhampton Art Gallery, 1982.
- Tromans, Nicholas. David Wilkie: The People's Painter. Edinburgh University Press, 2007.
