= Pierre Alexandre Schoenewerk =

French sculptor

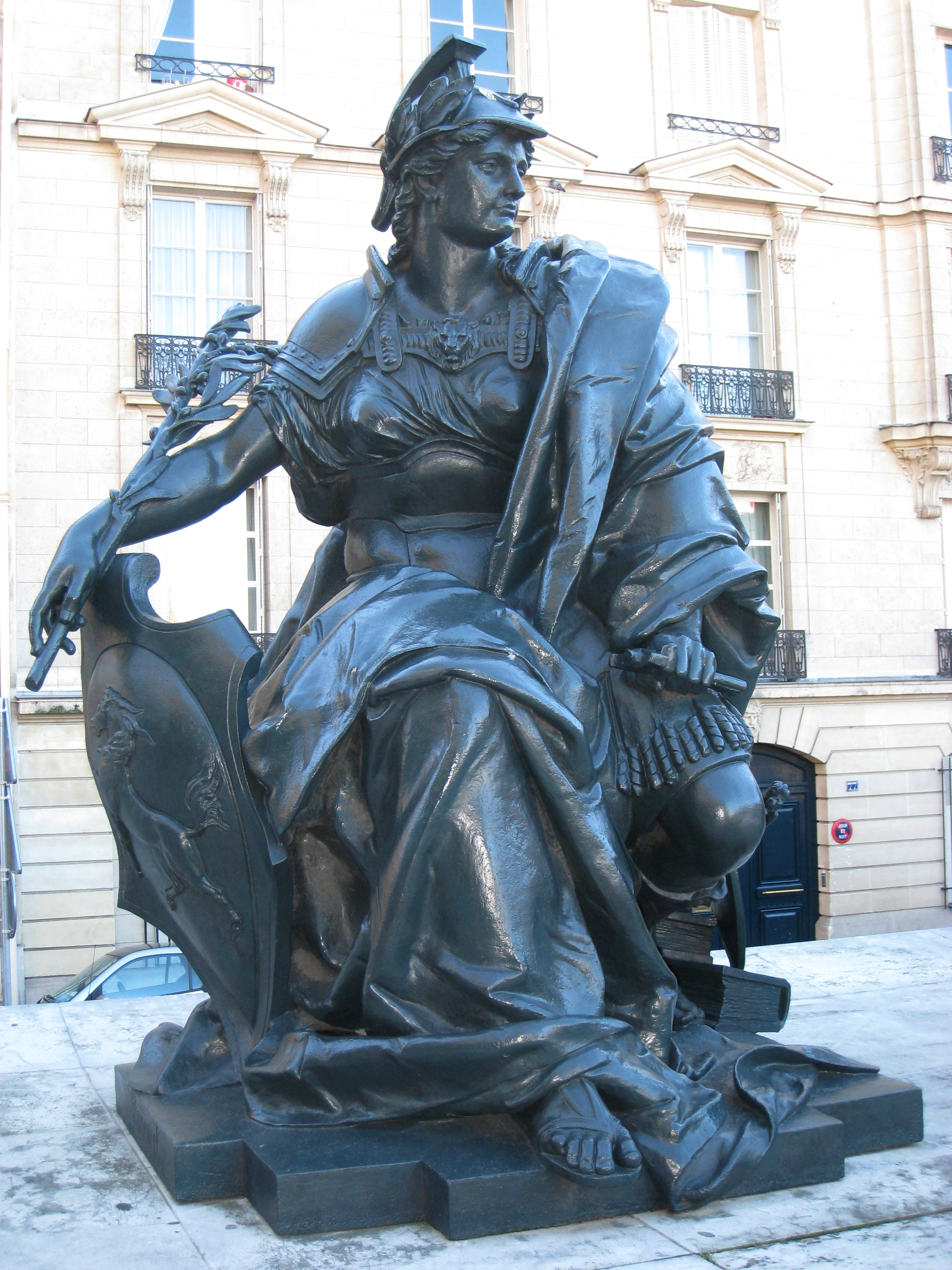
L'Europe, by Pierre Alexandre Schoenewerk

Pierre Alexandre Schoenewerk (18 February 1820 – 23 July 1885), or Alexandre Schoenewerk, was a French sculptor. He was a student of David d'Angers, and was named a Chevalier of the French Legion of Honor in 1873.

== Selected works ==
- La jeune Tarantine (Young Tarantine), marble, 1871 (Musée d'Orsay)
- L'Europe (Musée d'Orsay square)
- Jeune fille à la Fontaine, marble, 1873
- The bather, marble
- Andromeda, bronze
