= Salisbury Cathedral from Lower Marsh Close =

Painting by John Constable

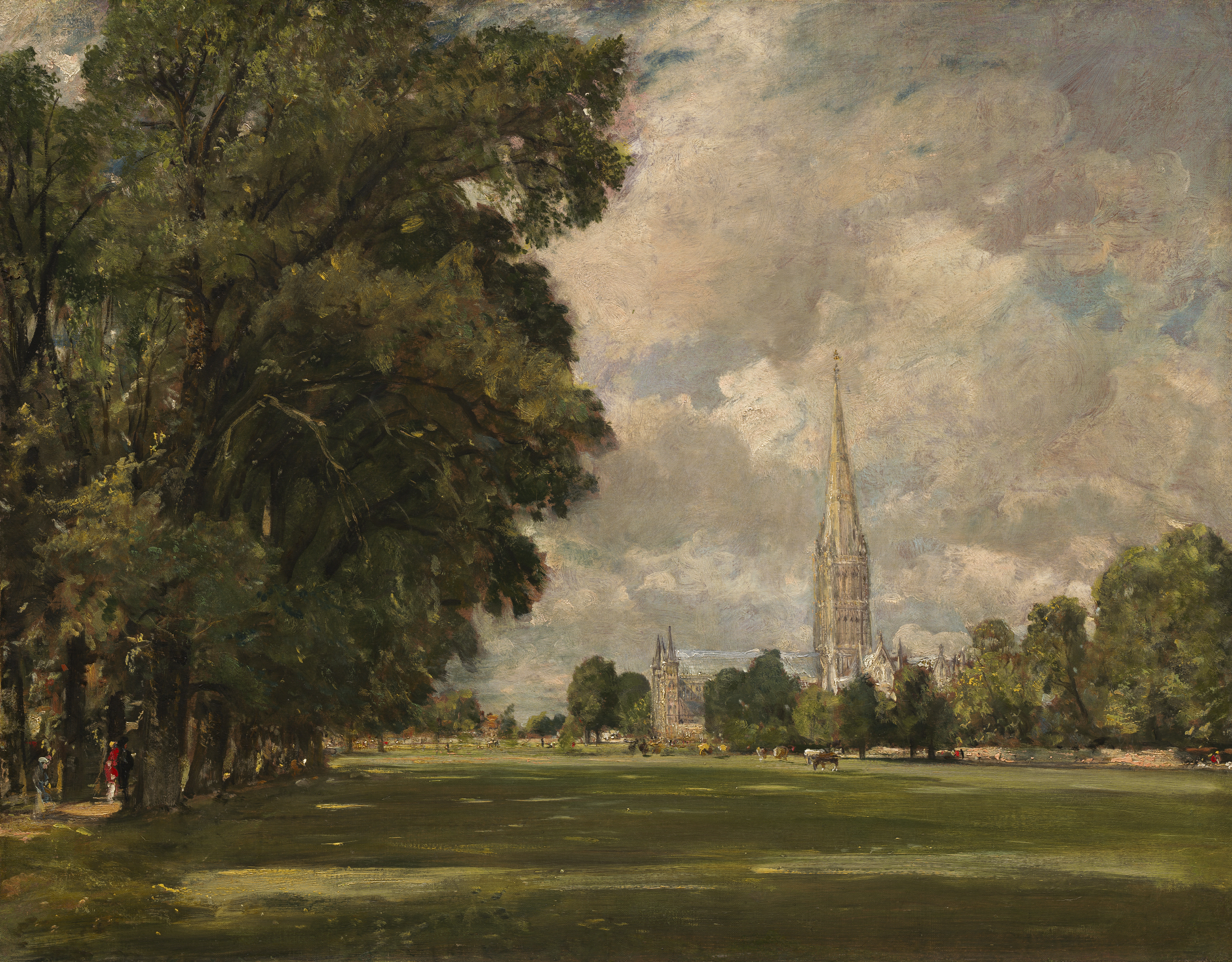
- Artist: John Constable
- Year: 1820
- Type: Oil on canvas, landscape painting
- Dimensions: 73 cm × 91 cm (29 in × 36 in)
- Location: National Gallery of Art, Washington D.C.

Salisbury Cathedral from Lower Marsh Close is an 1820 landscape painting by the British artist John Constable. It depicts a view of Salisbury Cathedral in the English county of Wiltshire, presenting it from the Lower Marsh Close. Salisbury appeared in a number of Constable's paintings. He was connected to the city through his friends and patrons the Bishop of Salisbury and his nephew John Fisher. Today the painting is in the collection of the National Gallery of Art of Washington, having been acquired in 1937.

== See also ==
- List of paintings by John Constable

== Bibliography ==
- Bailey, Anthony. John Constable: A Kingdom of his Own. Random House, 2012.
- Bury, Stephen (ed.) Benezit Dictionary of British Graphic Artists and Illustrators, Volume 1. OUP, 2012.
- Charles, Victoria. Constable. Parkstone International, 2015.
- Price, Nicholas M., Talley, Kirby & Vaccaro, Alessandra Melucco Historical and Philosophical Issues in the Conservation of Cultural Heritage. Getty Publications, 2016.
