= Portrait of Earl Grey =

Painting by Thomas Phillips

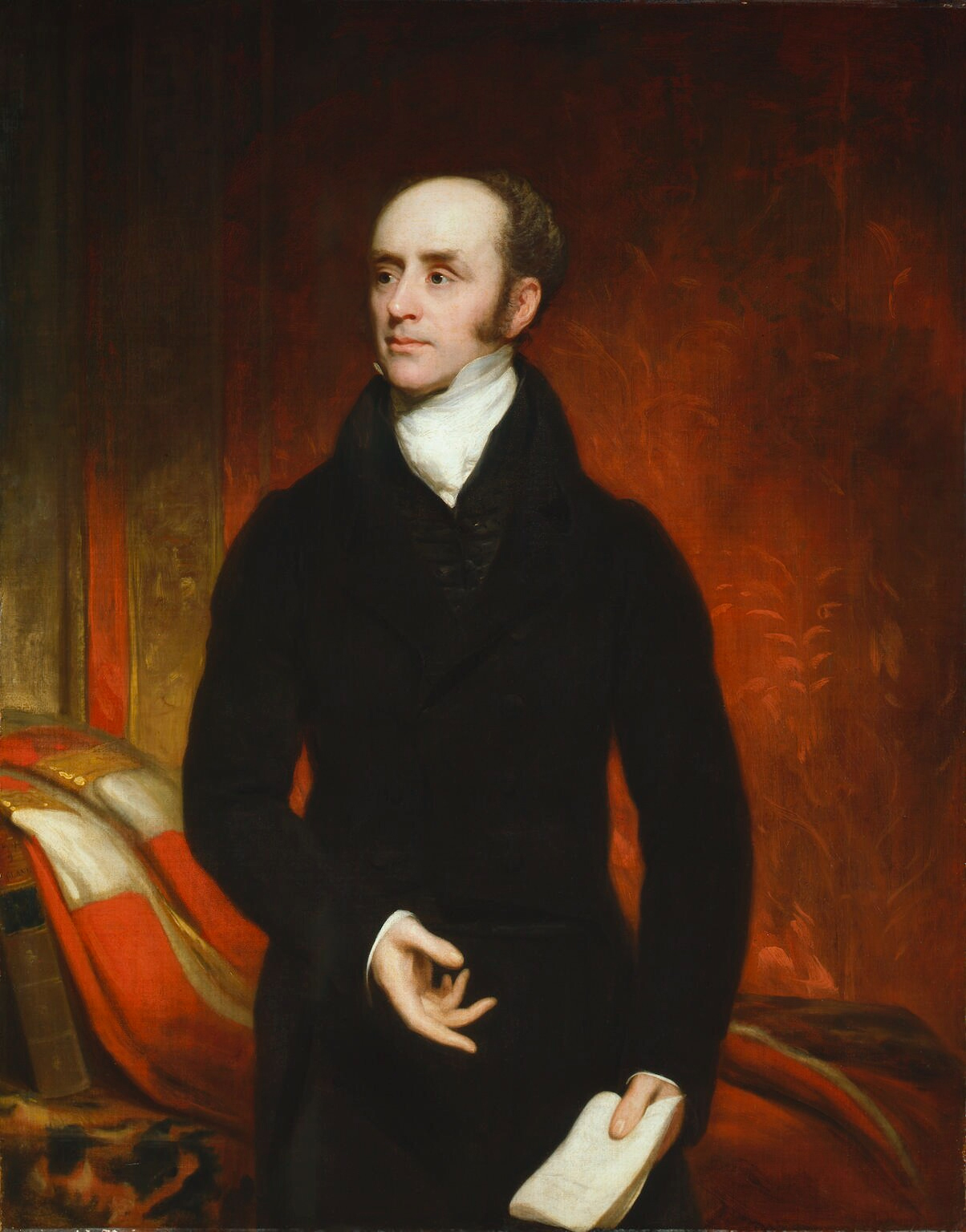
- Artist: Thomas Phillips
- Year: 1820
- Type: Oil on canvas, portrait
- Dimensions: 127.6 cm × 101 cm (50.2 in × 40 in)
- Location: National Portrait Gallery, London

Portrait of Earl Grey is an 1820 portrait painting by the English artist Thomas Phillips depicting the British aristocrat and Whig politician Charles Grey, 2nd Earl Grey, who later became Prime Minister.

== History ==
After briefly serving as Foreign Secretary in 1806–07 during the Ministry of All the Talents he was in opposition for many years. He effectively functioned as its leader during the Regency era closely allied with Lord Grenville. Grey took a prominent role for the defence during the Trial of Queen Caroline in the House of Lords the same year as the painting. He remained in opposition until 1830 when he became Prime Minister. He headed the government for four years passing through the Great Reform Act and the Abolition of Slavery.

Phillips was a prominent portraitist and member of the Royal Academy. He shows Grey as a statesman, with his robes as a British peer behind him. He produced three versions of the painting, one commissioned by Earl Fitzwilliam. A version was displayed at the Royal Academy's Summer Exhibition at Somerset House in 1820. One version is now in the National Portrait Gallery in Central London, having been acquired in 1960.

Grey was also notably painted by Thomas Lawrence, a work that now hangs at Howick Hall.

== Bibliography ==
- Crane, David. Romantics & Revolutionaries: Regency Portraits from the National Portrait Gallery London. National Portrait Gallery, 2002.
- O'Keeffe, Paul. A Genius for Failure: The life of Benjamin Robert Haydon. Random House, 2011.
- Smith, E.A. Lord Grey, 1764-1845. Clarendon Press, 1990.
