= Venus in Search of Cupid Surprises Diana =

Painting by William Hilton

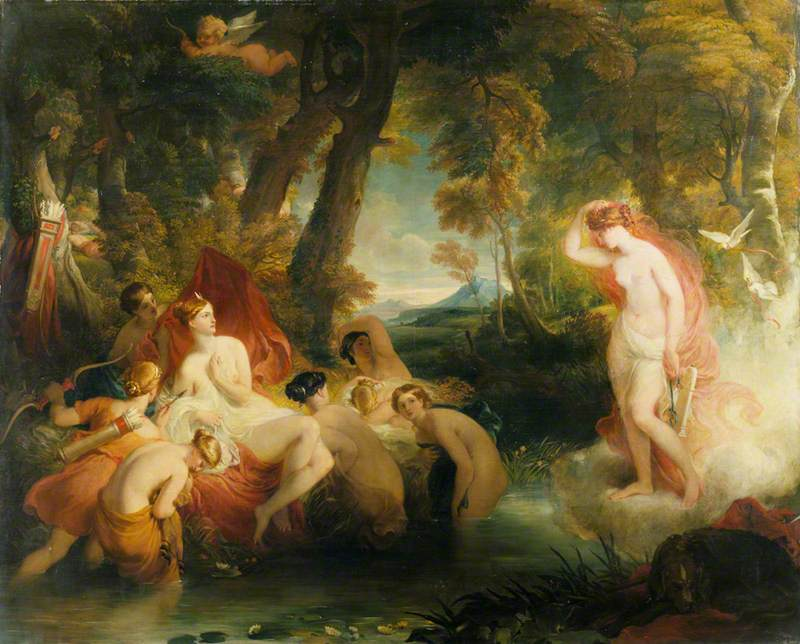
- Artist: William Hilton
- Year: 1820
- Medium: Oil on canvas
- Dimensions: 154.8 cm × 191 cm (60.9 in × 75 in)
- Location: Wallace Collection, London

Venus in Search of Cupid Surprises Diana is an 1820 oil painting by the British artist William Hilton. It depicts a scene from the poem The Faerie Queene by the Tudor era writer Edmund Spenser. The style pays homage to the Old Master Titian. Venus, searching for her son Cupid, runs across Diana and her attendants bathing nude. It was one of seven paintings that Hilton produced over a number of years illustrating scenes from the poem.

The painting was exhibited at the Royal Academy's 1820 Summer Exhibition at Somerset House. Today it is in the Wallace Collection in London, having been acquired by Marquess of Hertford in 1854.

== Bibliography ==
- Ingamells, John. The Wallace Collection: British, German, Italian, Spanish. Wallace Collection, 1985.
- Hamilton, A.C. (ed.) The Spenser Encyclopedia. Routledge, 1 Jul 2020.
- Peakman, Julie. Travellers in Eighteenth Century Europe: The Sexes Abroad. Pen and Sword History, 2025.
