= Rome, from the Vatican =

Painting by J. M. W. Turner

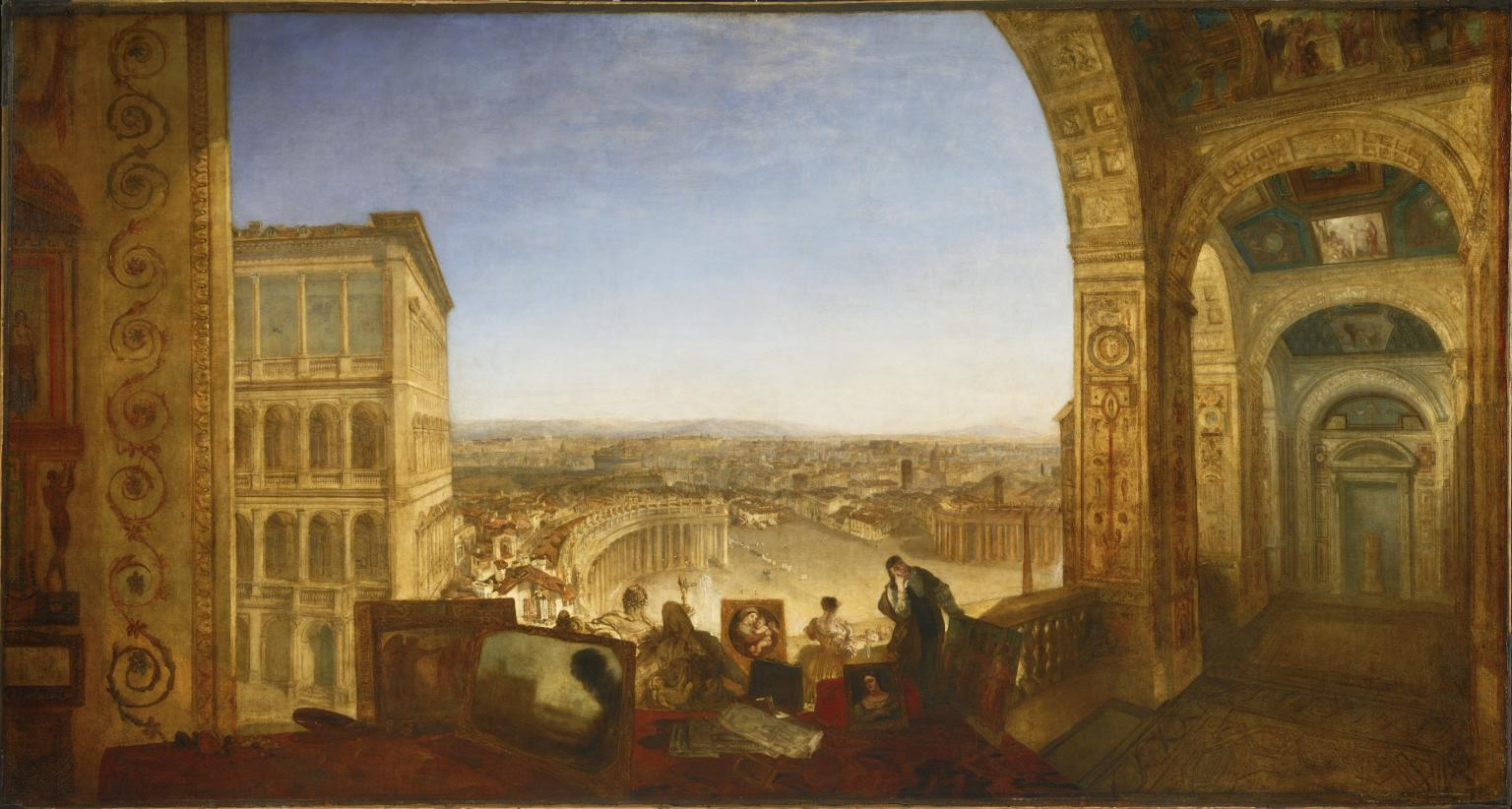
- Artist: J. M. W. Turner
- Year: 1820
- Type: Oil on canvas
- Dimensions: 177 cm × 335.5 cm (70 in × 132.1 in)
- Location: Tate Britain, London
- Website: www.tate.org.uk/...n00503

Rome, from the Vatican is an 1820 history painting by the English artist J. M. W. Turner. Turner painted it following his a lengthy trip to Italy and exhibited it at the Royal Academy Summer Exhibition at Somerset House. It commemorates the three hundredth anniversary of the death of the Renaissance painter Raphael. Raphael is shown in the Vatican loggias in the company of La Fornarina overlooking the city of Rome. Its longer title is Rome, from the Vatican. Raffaelle, Accompanied by La Fornarina, Preparing his Pictures for the Decoration of the Loggia.

Turner had recently paid a lengthy visit to Italy and had done extensive sketching around Rome. He painted the work in eight to ten weeks after returning London in time to exhibit at the Royal Academy. He chose to add Bernini's colonnades in St. Peter's Square although these were not constructed until the seventeenth century. Shown around the artist are several of his masterpieces.

It was part of the Turner Bequest in 1856 and is now in the Tate Britain's collection.

== See also ==
- List of paintings by J. M. W. Turner

== Bibliography ==
- Hamilton, James. Turner - A Life. Sceptre, 1998.
