= Edward Bird =

English painter

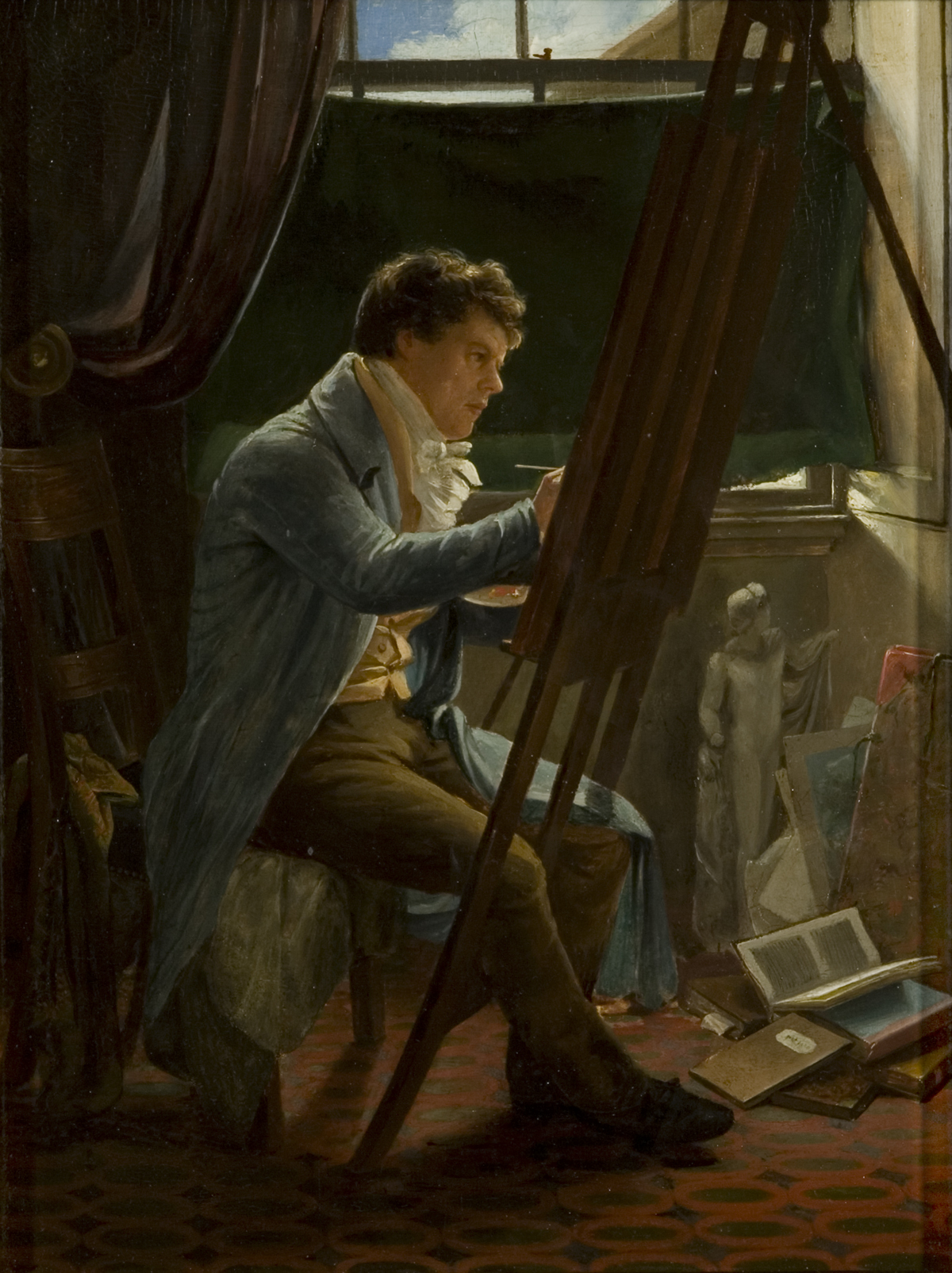
- Edward Bird by Edward Villiers Rippingille, 1817
- Born: 1772; Wolverhampton
- Died: 2 November 1819 (aged 46–47); Bristol
- Known for: Genre painting, History painting

Edward Bird RA (1772 – 2 November 1819) was an English genre painter who spent most of his working life in Bristol, where the Bristol School of artists formed around him. He enjoyed a few years of popularity in London, where he challenged the dominance of Sir David Wilkie in the genre painting field, before moving on to history painting, specialising in battle scenes.

== Early years ==
Bird was born in Wolverhampton, the son of a carpenter. He received no formal artistic training, but from the age of 13 developed his skills through apprenticeship as a japanning artist painting tea trays for Henry Clay in Birmingham. Once such tray, depicting the death of James Cook, after a painting by George Carter, is now in the Australian Maritime Museum.

In 1794 Bird moved to Bristol, where he married Martha Dodrell and pursued a career in artistic commissions: portraiture, book illustrations, and church painting.

== Bristol School ==
At Bristol, Bird became the centre of an informal group which included other artists such as Edward Villiers Rippingille and Nathan Cooper Branwhite, and which developed into the Bristol School. Initially amateur artists dominated the group, and Bird's closest friends included the amateurs John King, who was also Bird's doctor, and George Cumberland. Cumberland, who moved to Bristol in 1807, became godfather to Bird's son. He had a large art collection from which he would lend items for Bird to study.

The group conducted evening sketching meetings and sketching excursions to scenic locations around Bristol. Landscape with Cottage was probably painted on one of these trips. However, Bird painted landscapes relatively infrequently and he would often accompany the excursions without joining in the sketching. Bird's greatest influence on the Bristol artists was in the naturalistic style and fresh colours of his genre painting, especially so in the case of Rippingille, who worked closely with him. In 1814 they both exhibited works at the Royal Academy with the same subject, The Cheat Detected. Francis Danby, who moved to Bristol from Ireland in 1813 and was to succeed Bird as a leader of the Bristol School, was also influenced by Bird's genre style.

== Success ==
In 1809, he exhibited at the Royal Academy Exhibition of 1809, Good News, a genre portrait of an old soldier. Placed next to Wilkie's The Cut Finger, it attracted attention, and Bird's popularity grew when the Prince Regent bought his The Village Choristers and commissioned Blind Man's Buff. His works also include the Field of Chevy Chase and the Day after the Battle, which was pronounced his masterpiece.

Bird was elected an associate of the Royal Academy in 1812, was appointed historical painter to Princess Charlotte in 1813, and elected a full member in 1815.

Plagued by ill-health for over five years and unable to paint in the last year of his life, Bird died on 2 November 1819. He was buried in Bristol Cathedral. The following year a successful retrospective exhibition of his work was shown at the Bristol Fire Office, for the benefit of his family. His son George later became a midshipman, his equipment paid for by the subscriptions of Bird's friends. His daughter Martha became a Bristol watercolourist, and the younger daughter Harriet a governess.

== Gallery ==
The Old Soldier's Story, 1808

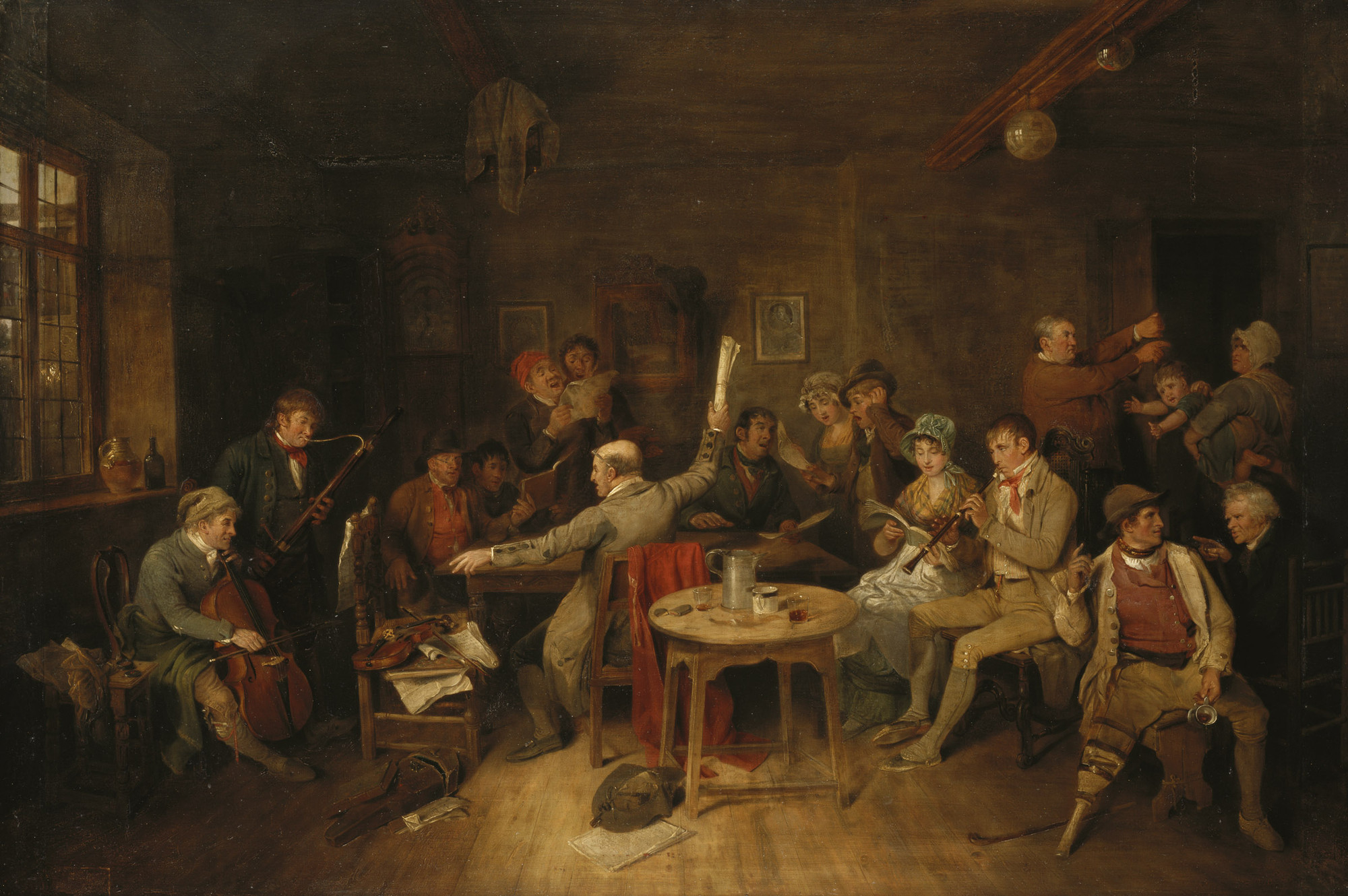
The Village Choristers, 1810

The Reading of the Will Concluded, 1811

Queen Philippa Supplicating King Edward to Spare the Lives of the Six Burghers of Calais, 1814

The Cheat Detected, 1814

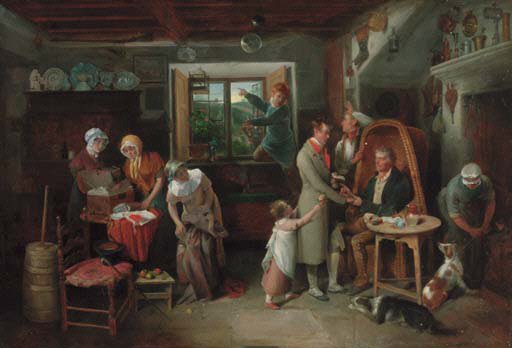
The Departure to London, 1815

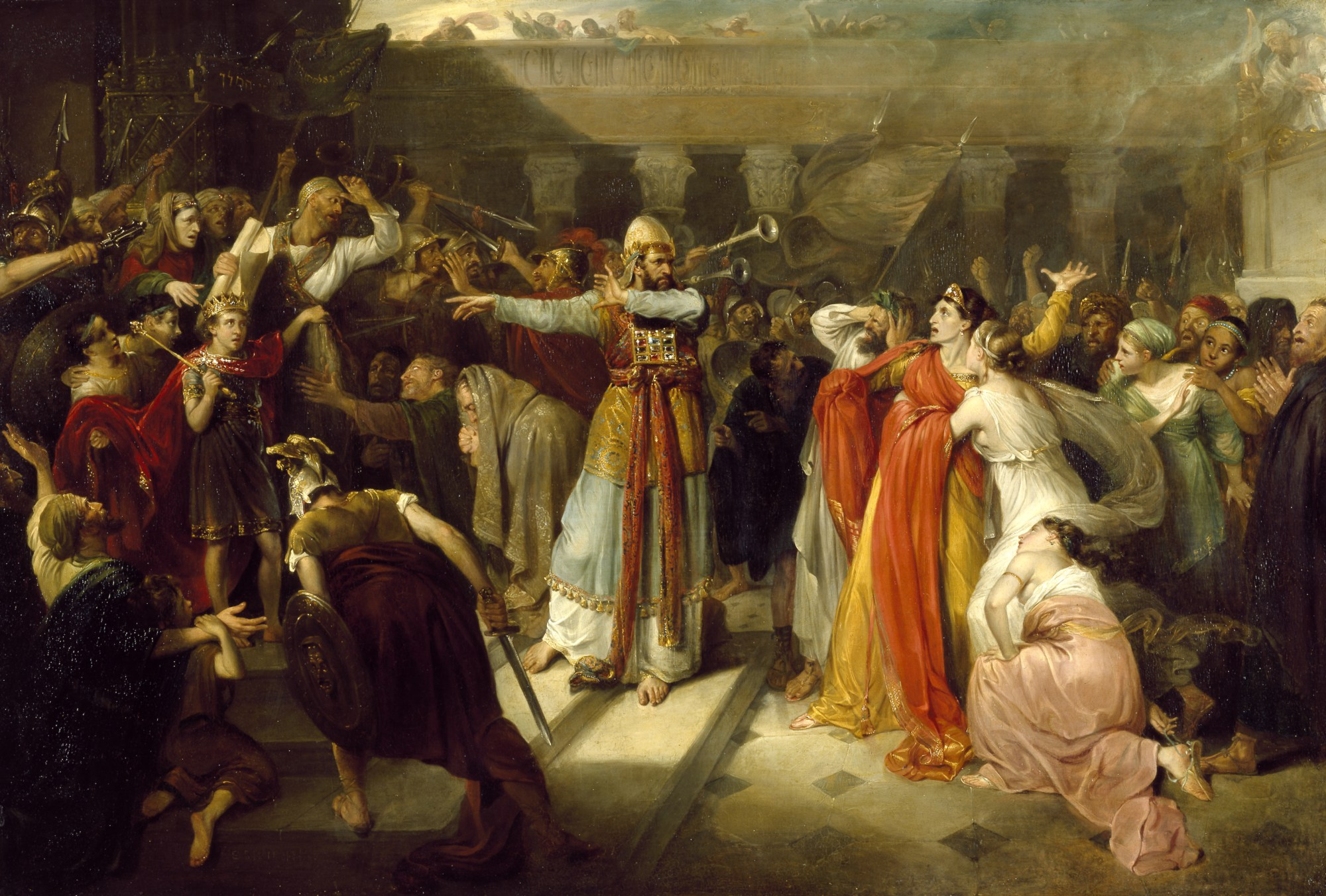
Proclaiming Joash King, 1815

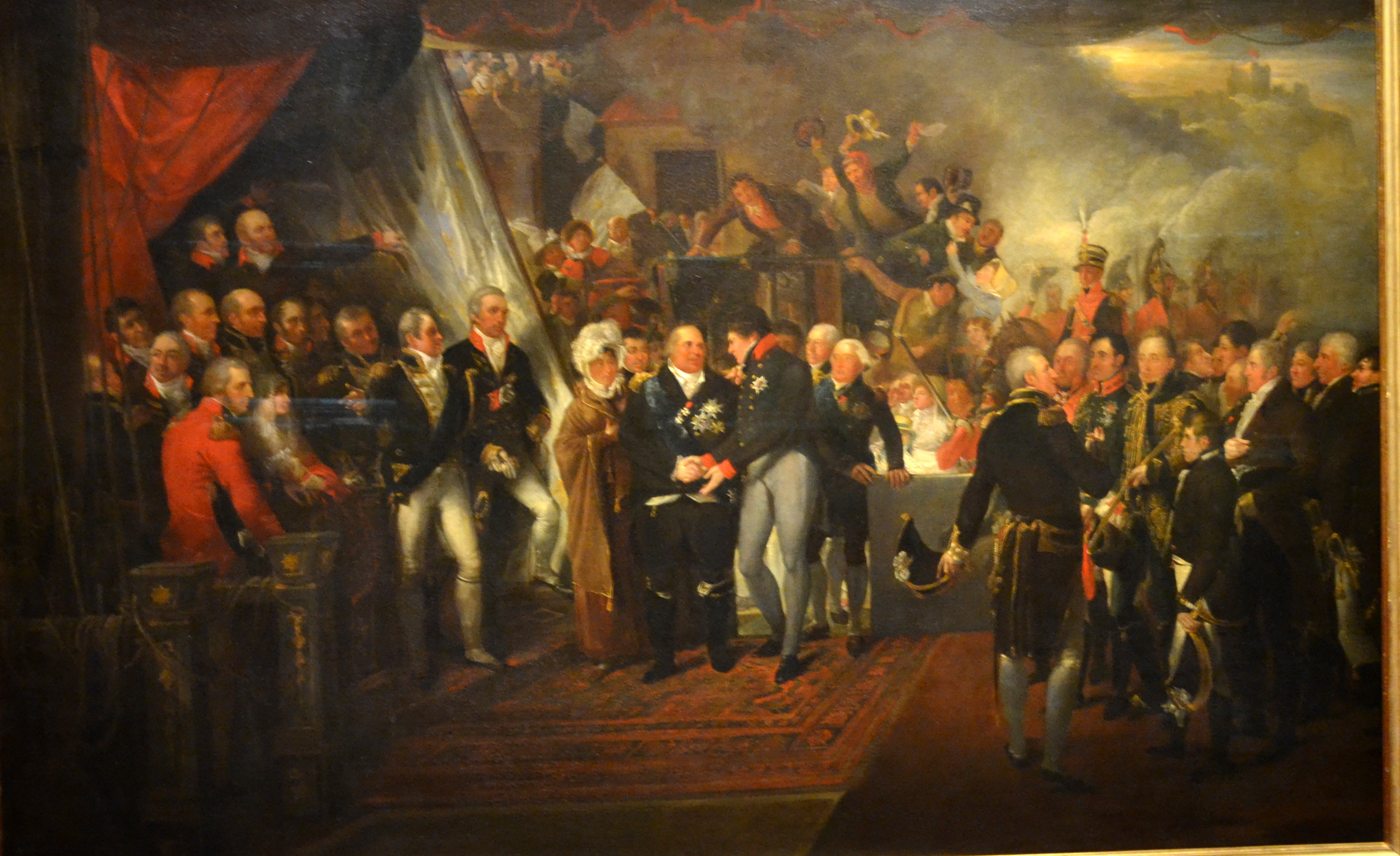
The Embarkation of Louis XVIII at Dover, 1816

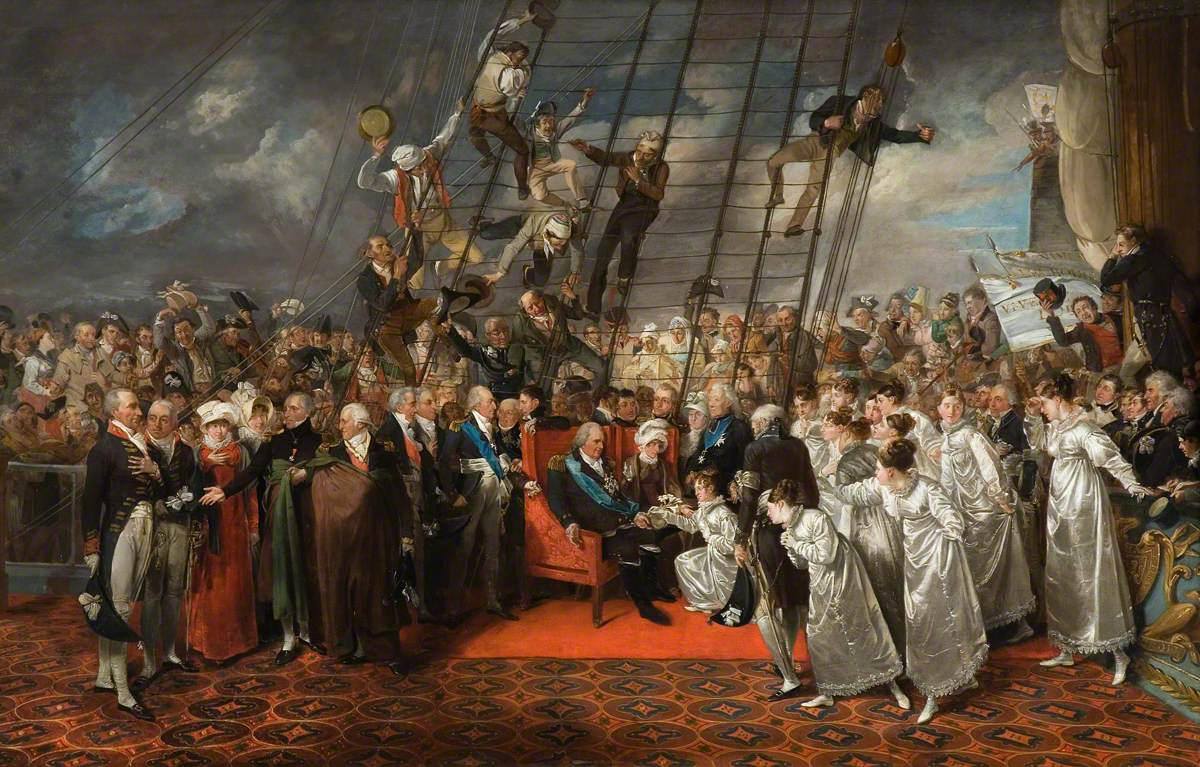
The Arrival of King Louis XVIII of France at Calais, 1816

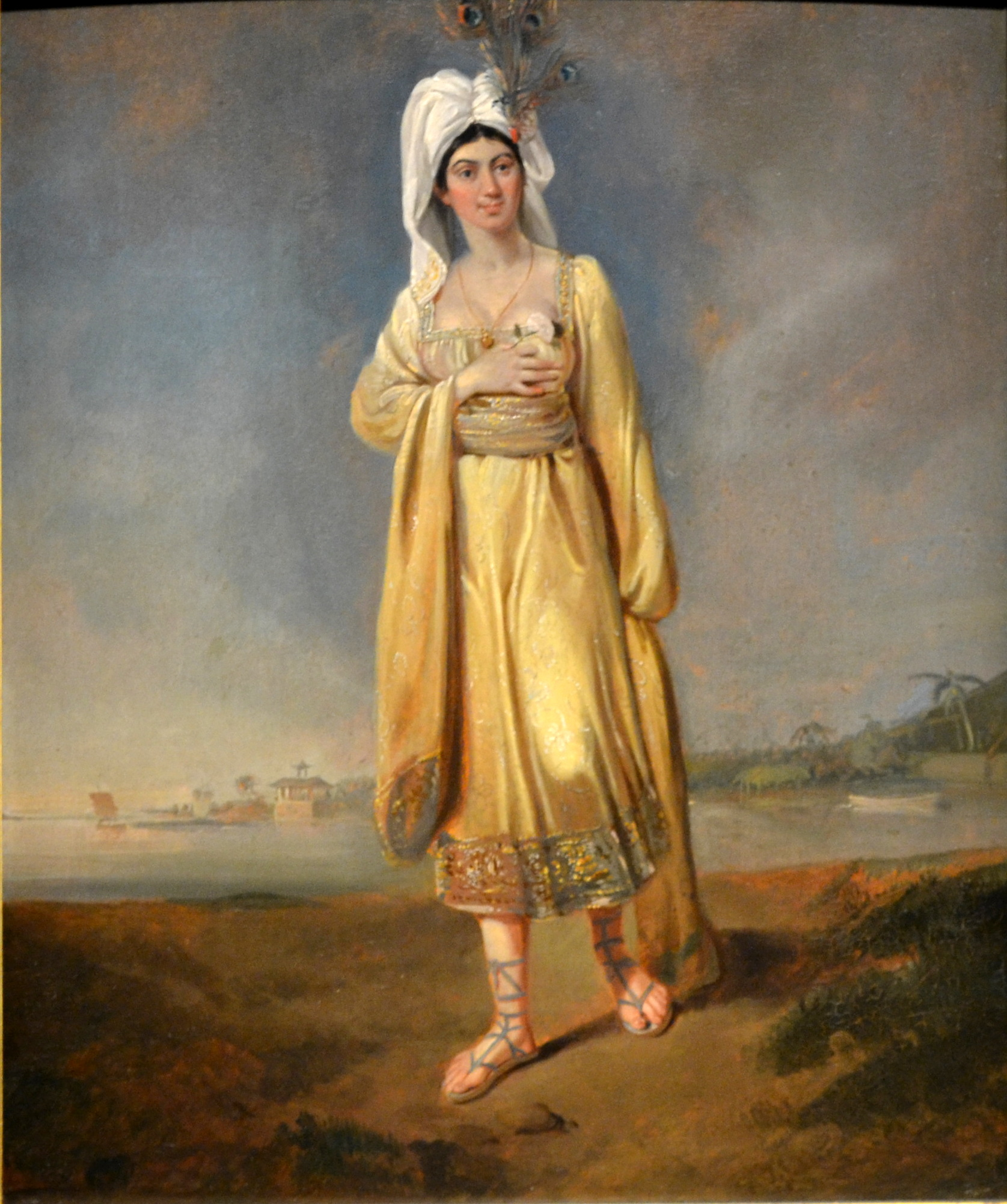
Princess Caraboo, 1817

The Italian Dancing Dogmaster
