= 1814 in art =

Events in the year 1814 in Art.

Goya – The Third of May 1808 (1814)

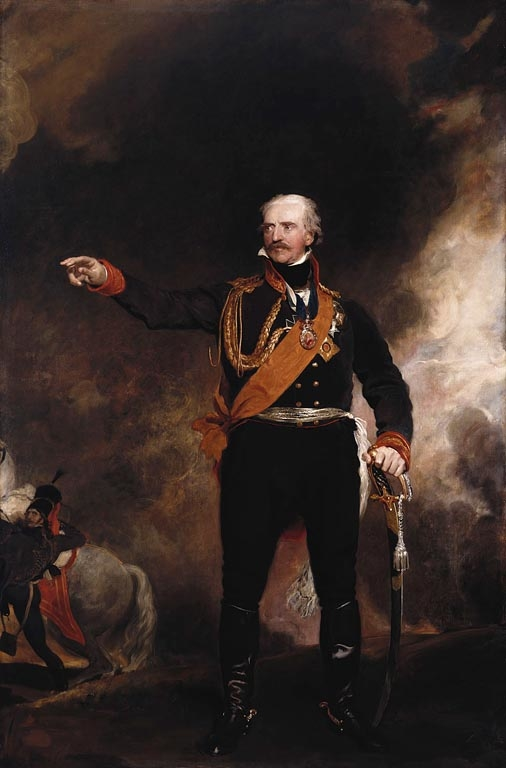
Lawrence – Portrait of Marshal Blücher.

== Events ==
- 2 May – The Royal Academy Exhibition of 1814 opens at Somerset House in London.
- 5 November – The Salon of 1814 opens at the Louvre in Paris, the first to take place following the Bourbon Restoration.
- A Madonna of St Jerome by Antonio da Correggio is returned to Parma, eighteen years after being looted by the French.

== Works ==
- Jean-Antoine Alavoine – The Elephant of the Bastille (full-size model)
- Edward Bird – The Cheat Detected
- Merry-Joseph Blondel - La Circassienne au Bain
- Antonio Canova – The Three Graces
- John Constable
  - The Celebration in East Bergholt of the Peace of 1814
  - The Mill Stream
- John Singleton Copley – The Battle of the Pyrenees
- Louis-Philippe Crépin – Louis XVIII Raising France from Its Ruins
- John Crome – The River Wensum, Norwich
- George Cruikshank
  - The Allied Bakers
  - The Corsican Shuttlecock
- Louis Daguerre – Interior of a Chapel of the Church of the Feuillants
- Jacques-Louis David
  - Apelles Painting Campaspe in the Presence of Alexander the Great
  - Leonidas at Thermopylae
- Charles Lock Eastlake – Brutus Exhorting the Romans to Revenge the Death of Lucretia
- Christoffer Wilhelm Eckersberg – View of the Forum in Rome
- François Gérard – Portrait of the Duke of Wellington
- Francisco Goya
  - The Second of May 1808
  - The Third of May 1808
- John James Halls – Edmund Kean as Richard III
- Hokusai
  - The Dream of the Fisherman's Wife (woodcut)
  - Hokusai Manga (publication begins)
- Jean Auguste Dominique Ingres
  - Grande Odalisque
  - Pope Pius VII in the Sistine Chapel
  - Portrait of Caroline Murat, Queen of Naples
  - Raphael and La Fornarina
- Thomas Lawrence
  - Portrait of Marshal Blücher
- John Smith of Darnick – William Wallace Statue, Bemersyde
- Thomas Phillips
  - Portrait of the Duke of Wellington
  - Portrait of Lord Byron
- Henry Raeburn – Boy and Rabbit
- J.M.W. Turner – Dido and Aeneas
- James Ward – Gordale Scar
- David Wilkie
  - The Pedlar
  - The Refusal

== Births ==
- January 17 – John Mix Stanley, American painter (died 1872)
- February 18 – Gustav Fabergé, Baltic German jeweller (died 1894)
- March 3 – Louis Buvelot, Swiss-Australian painter (died 1888)
- March 9 (February 25 O.S.) – Taras Shevchenko, Ukrainian poet and artist (died 1861)
- March 22 – Thomas Crawford, American sculptor (died 1857)
- May 21 – Louis Janmot, French painter and poet (died 1892)
- May 22 – Amalia Lindegren, Swedish painter (died 1891)
- July – Charles Lucy, English historical painter (died 1873)
- July 13 – Johann Halbig, German classicist sculptor (died 1882)
- August 26 – Johann Pucher, Slovene Catholic priest, inventor, scientist, photographer, artist and poet (died 1864)
- September 1 – John Cooke Bourne, English topographical artist, lithographer and photographer (died 1896)
- September 15 – Ferdinand von Arnim, German architect and watercolour painter (died 1866)
- October 4 – Jean-François Millet, French painter (died 1875)
- October 12 – Ernest Gambart, Belgian-born art dealer (died 1902)
- date unknown – Frederick William Fairholt, English engraver (died 1866)

== Deaths ==
- January 5 – Johann Friedrich Bause, German engraver (born 1738)
- January 20 – Jean-François Pierre Peyron, French neoclassical painter (born 1744)
- January 28 – Pierre Lacour, French painter (born 1745)
- February 26 – Johan Tobias Sergel, Swedish sculptor born in Stockholm (born 1740)
- February 27 – Margaret Bingham, British painter and writer (born 1740)
- March 29 – Claude Michel, French sculptor in the Rococo style (born 1738)
- May 31 – Arend Johan van Glinstra, Dutch painter (born 1754)
- June 17 – Henry Tresham, Irish-born painter of large-scale history paintings (born 1751)
- August 21 – Antonio Carnicero, Spanish painter in the Neoclassical style (born 1748)
- November 18 – Aleijadinho, Colonial Brazil-born sculptor and architect (born 1730/1738)
- November 30 – Jean-Michel Moreau, illustrator and engraver (born 1741)
- December 22 – Pieter Faes, Dutch painter of flowers and fruit (born 1760)
- date unknown
  - Pierre Chasselat, French miniature painter (born 1753)
  - Grigory Ostrovsky, Russian portraitist (born 1756)
  - Hyewon, Korean painter of the Joseon Dynasty (born 1758)
  - Andries Vermeulen, Dutch painter (born 1763)
