= Sheepshanks =

Sheepshanks is a surname. Notable people include:

- Anne Sheepshanks (1794–1855), English astronomical benefactor
  - Sheepshanks (crater), a lunar crater named for Anne Sheepshanks
- David Sheepshanks, British businessman
- Ernest Sheepshanks (1910–1937), English cricketer
- John Sheepshanks (disambiguation), multiple people
- Mary Sheepshanks (1872–1960), English pacifist, feminist, journalist, and social worker
- Richard Sheepshanks (1794–1855), English astronomer
  - Sheepshanks equatorial, of many things named for Sheepshanks this was refracting telescope of the Royal Observatory at Greenwich
- Sheepshanks Gift, 1857 donation of art
