= Oswald Sickert =

Danish-German artist

Oswald Adalbert Sickert
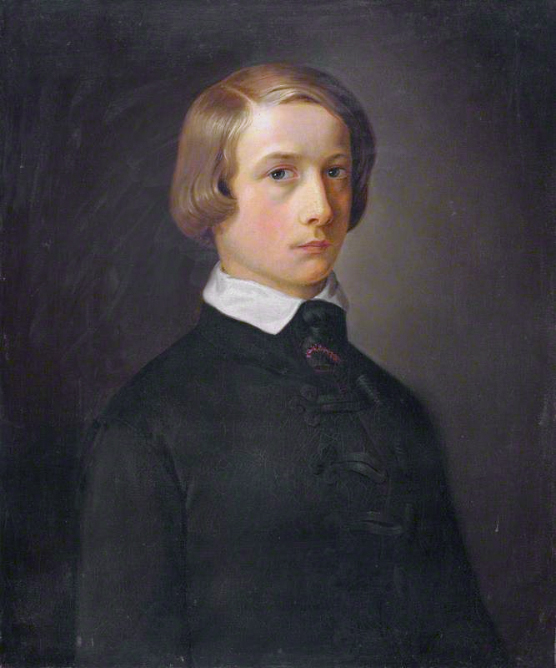
- Self portrait (c. 1844)
- Born: 21 February 1828; Altona, Denmark
- Died: 11 November 1885 (aged 57); London, United Kingdom
- Education: Royal Danish Academy of Fine Arts
- Known for: Landscape painting, engraving
- Movement: Romanticism
- Spouse: Eleanor Louisa Henry
- Children: Helena Swanwick, Walter Sickert and others

Oswald Adalbert Sickert (21 February 1828 – 11 November 1885) was a Danish artist. His landscape paintings are primarily of the dramatic genre, and his engravings are from the English school.

== Early life ==
He was born in Altona, then in Denmark, the son of Johann Jürgen Sickert (1803–1864), who was also a painter and engraver.

He received his formal training from his father and at the Copenhagen Académie in Denmark from 1844 to 1846. In 1852, he traveled to Munich to complete his studies, and thereafter to Paris for six months together with Wilhelm Füssli, before moving permanently to London.

== Career ==
He left Munich to settle in England at the time of the Great Exhibition, Oswald's work having been recommended by Freiin Rebecca von Kreusser to Ralph Nicholson Wornum, who was Keeper of the National Gallery in London at the time.

He opened a studio in London and eventually became a British citizen. His successful career as an artist included exhibitions at the British Institute, Grosvenor Gallery and several other London galleries.

== Personal life ==
He married Eleanor Louisa Henry, the illegitimate daughter of the English astronomer Richard Sheepshanks (1794–1855).

He had five sons and one daughter.

- Oswald Valentine, author, salesman and international traveller for Encyclopædia Britannica.
- Robert, a recluse who died from injuries when he was hit by a lorry.
- Leonard, who died after a long battle with substance abuse.
- Walter Sickert (1860–1942), an influential post-impressionist painter and printmaker.
- Bernhard, a painter and architectural engraver, suffered from depression and alcoholism.
- Helena (1864–1939), later Helena Swanwick, a suffragist and pacifist.

None of his children produced grandchildren.

He is buried in Brompton Cemetery, London.

== Artworks and personal papers ==
Paintings and sketches by Oswald Sickert are held at Islington Local History Centre. The centre's Walter Sickert archive also contains papers related to Oswald Sickert.
