= Wilhelm Füssli =

Swiss portrait artist (1830–1916)

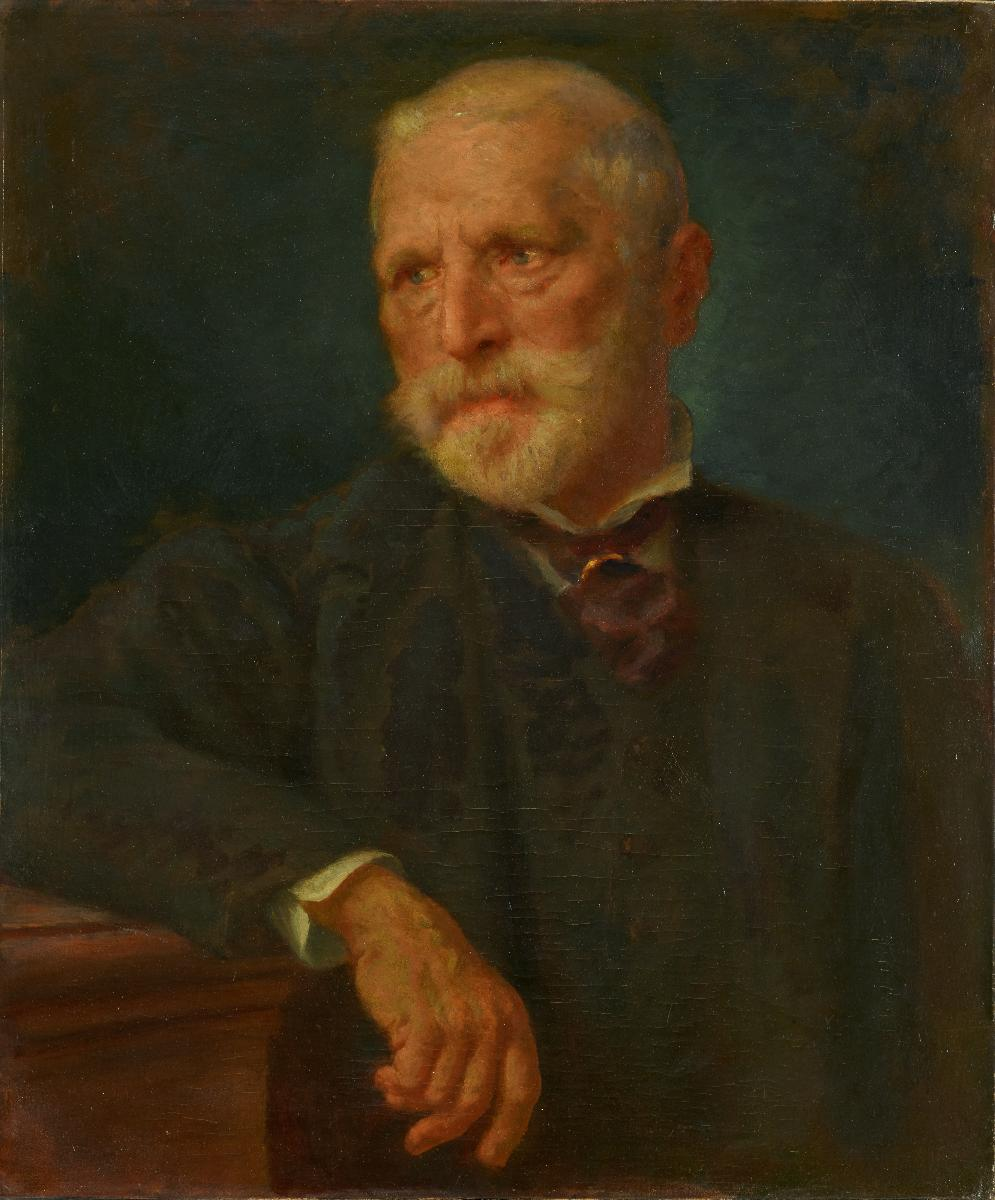
- Self-portrait c. 1900
- Born: Wilhelm Heinrich Füssli; 16 January 1830; Zurich, Switzerland
- Died: 11 January 1916 (aged 85); Baden-Baden, German Empire (now Germany)
- Education: Städelschule
- Known for: Portrait painting
- Spouse: Emma von Möllenbeck (m. 1860)
- Children: 1

Wilhelm Heinrich Füssli (Swiss Standard German pronunciation: [ˈvɪlhɛlm ˈfʏsli]; 16 January 1830 – 11 January 1916) was a Swiss portrait artist and drawer who was primarily painting in oil and pastel colors.

== Early life and education ==
Füssli was born 16 January 1830 in Zurich, Switzerland, the only child of Wilhelm Füssli (1803–1845), a jurist, politician, publicist and author, and Anna Füssli (née Locher), both from old established families in Zurich. Füssli had a younger sister, Anna ("Nanni"). During his childhood, he spent extended periods with his grandfather, Wilhelm Füssli, at his residence "Zum weissen Fräuli" ("At the Little White Lady"), while his father was frequently traveling.

He grew up in a artistically inclined family with his father being an amateur painter. With parental support, Füssli studied under Jakob Becker, who was known for the Düsseldorf School of Painting, at Städelschule in Frankfurt am Main. From 1849, he was briefly a student at the Academy of Fine Arts, Munich, and apprenticed at the studio of Johann Baptist Berdellé, known of historism and portrait painting.

Füssli maintained connections with numerous artists and intellectuals, including Édouard Manet, Anselm Feuerbach, and the writers Gottfried Keller and Paul Heyse.

== Artistic career ==
In 1850, he undertook his first study trip to Italy, visiting Venice. In 1853, he travelled to Paris with the painter Oswald Sickert, where he studied in the studio of Thomas Couture and copied works of the Old Masters in the Louvre.

He later lived in Italy for several years between 1861 and 1868, working mainly in Florence and Rome and executing portrait commissions while studying artists such as Titian and Raphael.

In 1869, he participated in the Munich International Art Exhibition and was awarded a gold medal.

== Personal life ==
In 1860, Füssli married German-born Emma Eleonora Viktoria Rosalie von Möllenbeck (born 1835), originally from Karlsruhe, hailing from a noble family with her father being a legation councilor. They had one daughter;

- Anna Eleonora "Nora" Füssli (1874–1941), married firstly Werner von Siemens (1856–1900), a farmer and son of the industrialist Carl Heinrich von Siemens, with whom she had a son who died young. She married secondly to Prince Malcolm Khan and thirdly Italian-born general Luigi Fecia di Cossato, both times without issue. In 1923, she married a fourth time to Werner Ferdinand von Siemens (1885–1937), son of Georg Wilhelm von Siemens.

After his death on 11 January 1916 the Füssli family name became extinct in the male line.
