= The Refusal (painting) =

Painting by David Wilkie

- Artist: David Wilkie
- Year: 1814
- Type: Oil on panel, genre painting
- Dimensions: 60.5 cm × 52.5 cm (23.8 in × 20.7 in)
- Location: Victoria and Albert Museum, London

The Refusal is an 1814 genre painting by the British artist David Wilkie. It depicts a scene inspired by the 1798 song "Duncan Gray" by Robert Burns. It portrays the proud Maggie having rejected an offer of marriage from her suitor Duncan Gray, although she later changes her mind. Wilkie's friend, the Irish painter William Mulready, was the model for Duncan Gray.

Wilkie, a Scottish-born painter who settled in England, became known for his genre paintings that drew artistic inspiration from the Dutch Old Masters of the seventeenth century. The painting was displayed at the Royal Academy's Summer Exhibition of 1814 at Somerset House in London along with Wilkie's The Letter of Introduction. It is now in collection of the Victoria and Albert Museum in South Kensington, having been donated as part of the Sheepshanks Gift by John Sheepshanks in 1857. A smaller version of the painting is in the Scottish National Gallery in Edinburgh.

== Bibliography ==
- Gillis, John R. For Better, for Worse: British Marriages, 1600 to the Present. Oxford University Press, 1985.
- Tromans, Nicholas. David Wilkie: The People's Painter. Edinburgh University Press, 2007.
- Wright, Christopher, Gordon, Catherine May & Smith, Mary Peskett. British and Irish Paintings in Public Collections: An Index of British and Irish Oil Paintings by Artists Born Before 1870 in Public and Institutional Collections in the United Kingdom and Ireland. Yale University Press, 2006.
