= The Battle of the Pyrenees (painting) =

Painting by John Singleton Copley

- Artist: John Singleton Copley
- Year: 1814
- Medium: Oil on canvas
- Dimensions: 198 cm × 216 cm (78 in × 85 in)
- Location: Private collection

The Battle of the Pyrenees is an 1814 history painting by the Anglo-American artist John Singleton Copley. It depicts a scene from the Battle of the Pyrenees, fought in the summer of 1813 during the Peninsular War. The Allied Army led by the Duke of Wellington were able to repulse an attack led by the French commander Marshal Soult. The victory allowed Wellington to launch his invasion of France later in the year. The focus of the painting is Wellington, mounted on a white horse, accompanied by two of his aide-de-camps the Prince of Orange to the left and the Earl of March to the right, with the battle raging in the background.

The Boston-born Copley had settled in Britain several decades before. Although a noted producer of portraits, he is best known for his large battle paintings such as The Death of Major Pierson and The Defeat of the Floating Batteries at Gibraltar. He produced this work with the idea of displaying it at the Royal Academy Exhibition of 1814, but did not finish it in time. It was his final completed work before his death the following year. His son Lord Lyndhurst would later serve as Lord Chancellor in the cabinet of Wellington when he became Prime Minister in 1828.

== Bibliography ==
- Kamensky, Jane. A Revolution in Color: The World of John Singleton Copley. W. W. Norton & Company, 2016.
- Prown, Jules David. John Singleton Copley: In England, 1774–1815. National Gallery of Art, Washington, 1966.
- Wellesley, Charles. Wellington Portrayed. Unicorn Press, 2014.
