= Royal Academy Exhibition of 1814 =

1814 art exhibition in London

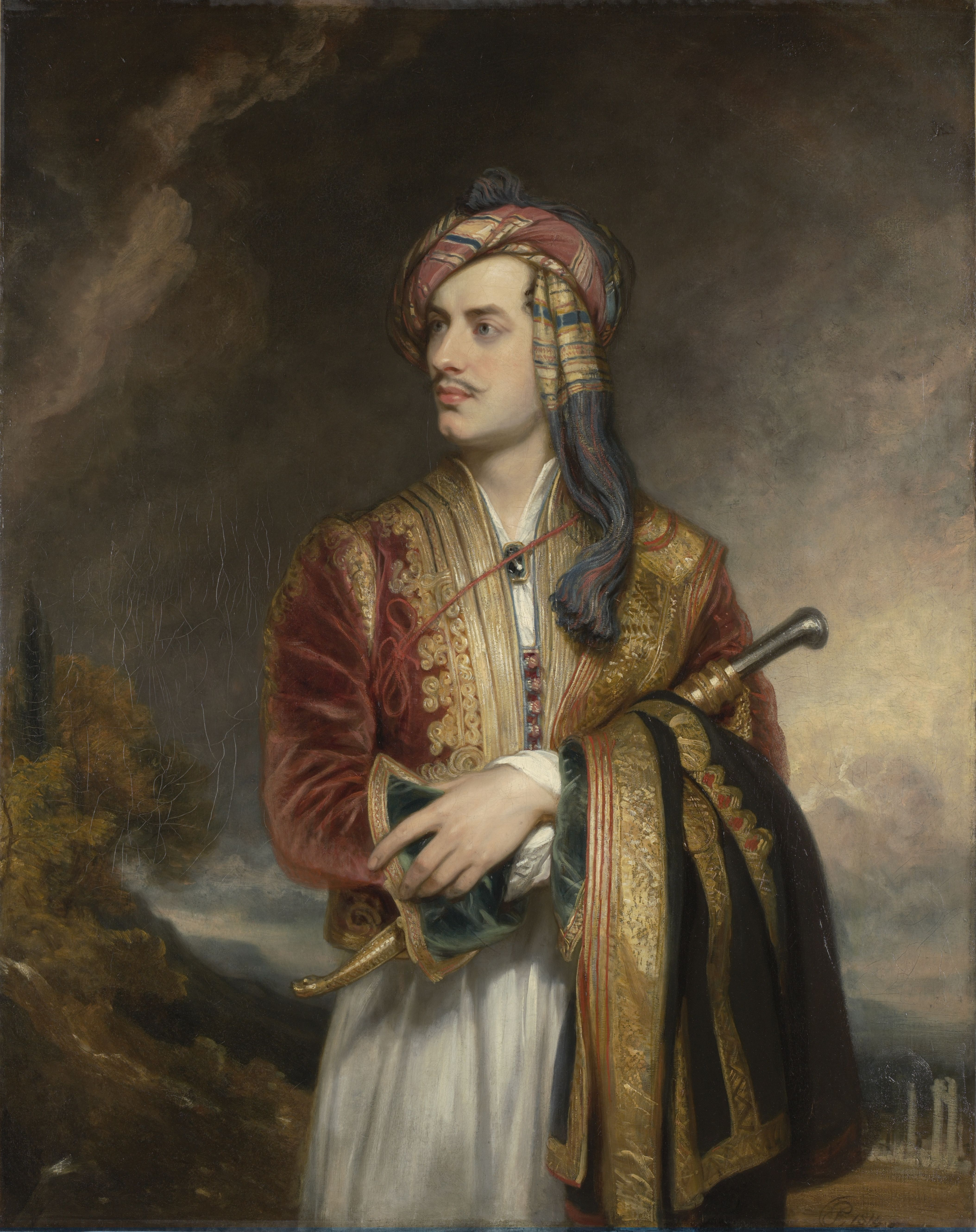
Lord Byron in Albanian Dress by Thomas Phillips

The Royal Academy Exhibition of 1814 was the annual Summer Exhibition of the British Royal Academy of Arts. It was held at Somerset House in London from 2 May to 9 July 1814.

The exhibition coincided with the visit of the Allied sovereigns' visit to England following victory in the Napoleonic Wars. Prominent European leaders allied to Britain for celebrations as a prelude to the Congress of Vienna. The Tsar of Russia Alexander I was amongst those who visited the Academy exhibition.

As was common during the era, portrait paintings made up a larg proportion of the artworks submitted. Notable amongst the works on display were two pictures by Thomas Phillips featuring the poet Lord Byron. Lord Byron in Albanian Dress made reference to the foreign travels that has inspired his breakthrough work Childe Harold's Pilgrimage, while the writer also featured in the more conventional Portrait of Lord Byron. The leading Regency era portraitist Thomas Lawrence displayed a number of paintings featuring political or society figures. Amongst them was a portrait of the British Foreign Secretary Lord Castlereagh who had been one of the architects of the coalition that defeated Napoleon. During the Allied visit Lawrence produced his Portrait of Marshal Blucher which he displayed at the 1815 Summer Exhibition. Other noted portrait painters submitting works included William Beechey, Martin Archer Shee and Henry Raeburn.

J.M.W. Turner Dido and Aeneas, a blend of landscape and history painting set in Ancient Carthage. John Constable featured a landscape Ploughing Scene in Suffolk, depicting rural life in his native county. In addition he submitted The Mill Stream.

The American Samuel Morse submitted a painting based on a scene from Don Quixote. David Wilkie displayed the genre paintings The Refusal and The Letter of Introduction. The Bristol School artist Edward Bird produced the genre work The Cheat Detected and the historical Queen Phillipa Pleading for the Lives of the Calais Burghers.

== Gallery ==
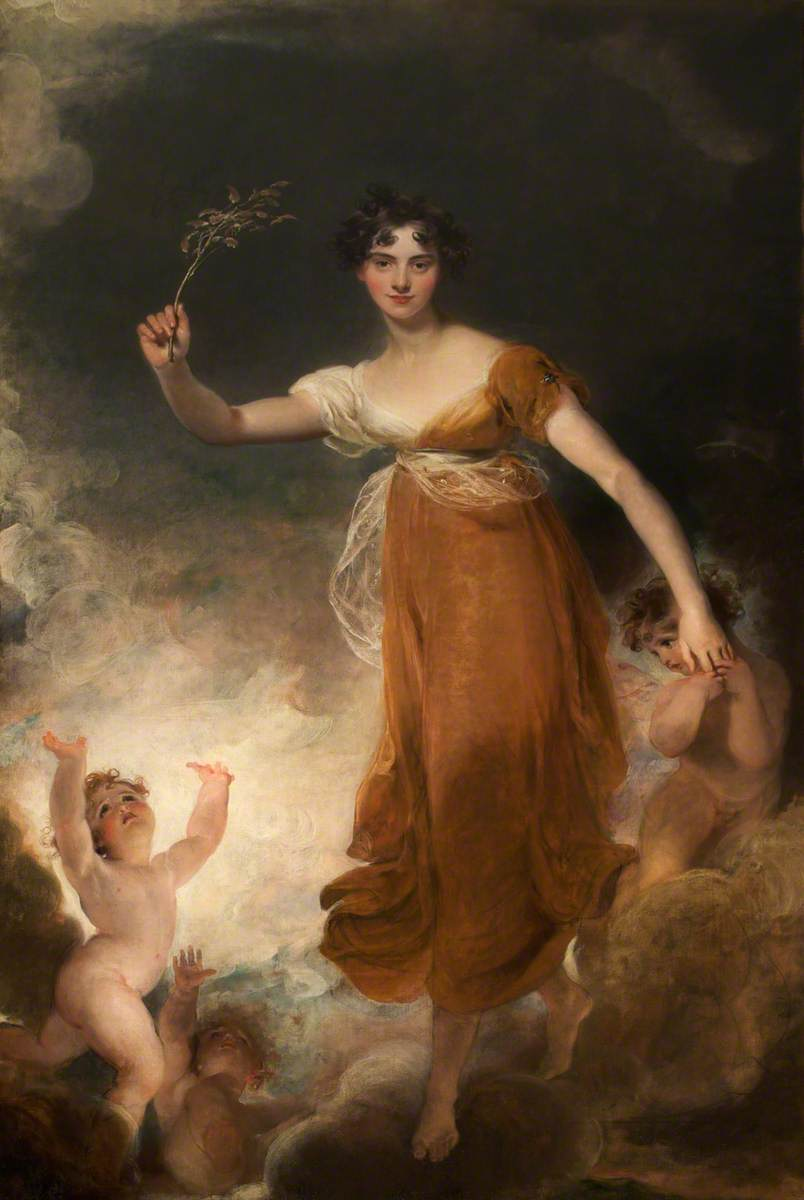
Lady Leicester as Hope by Thomas Lawrence

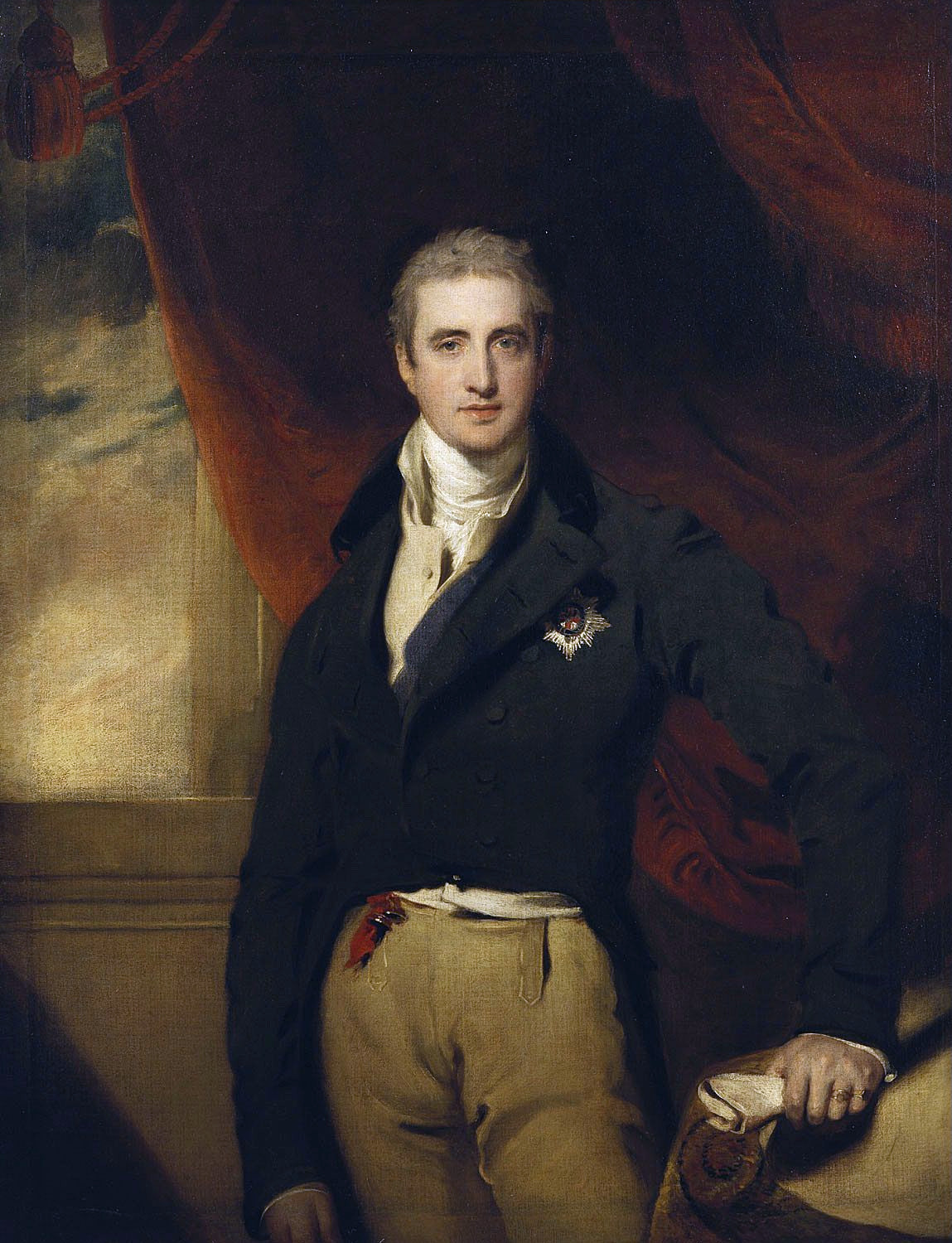
Portrait of Lord Castlereagh by Thomas Lawrence

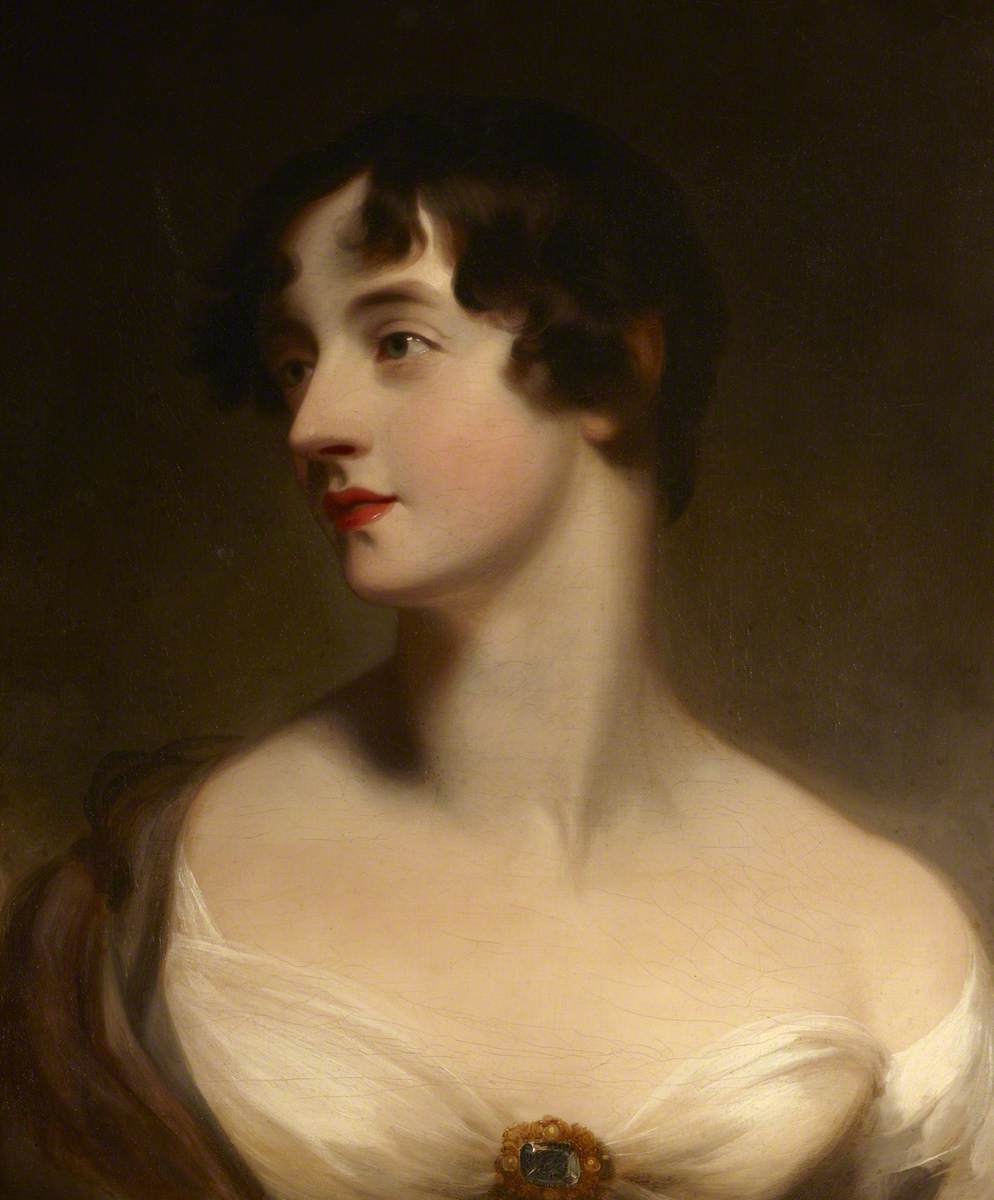
Portrait of Lady Grantham by Thomas Lawrence

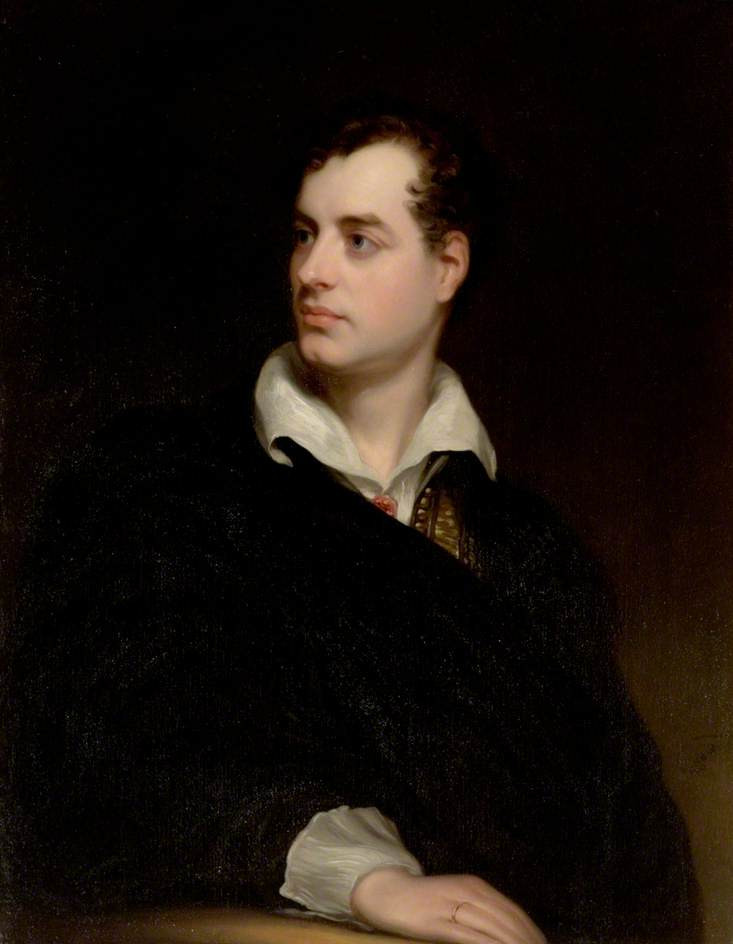
Portrait of Lord Byron by Thomas Phillips

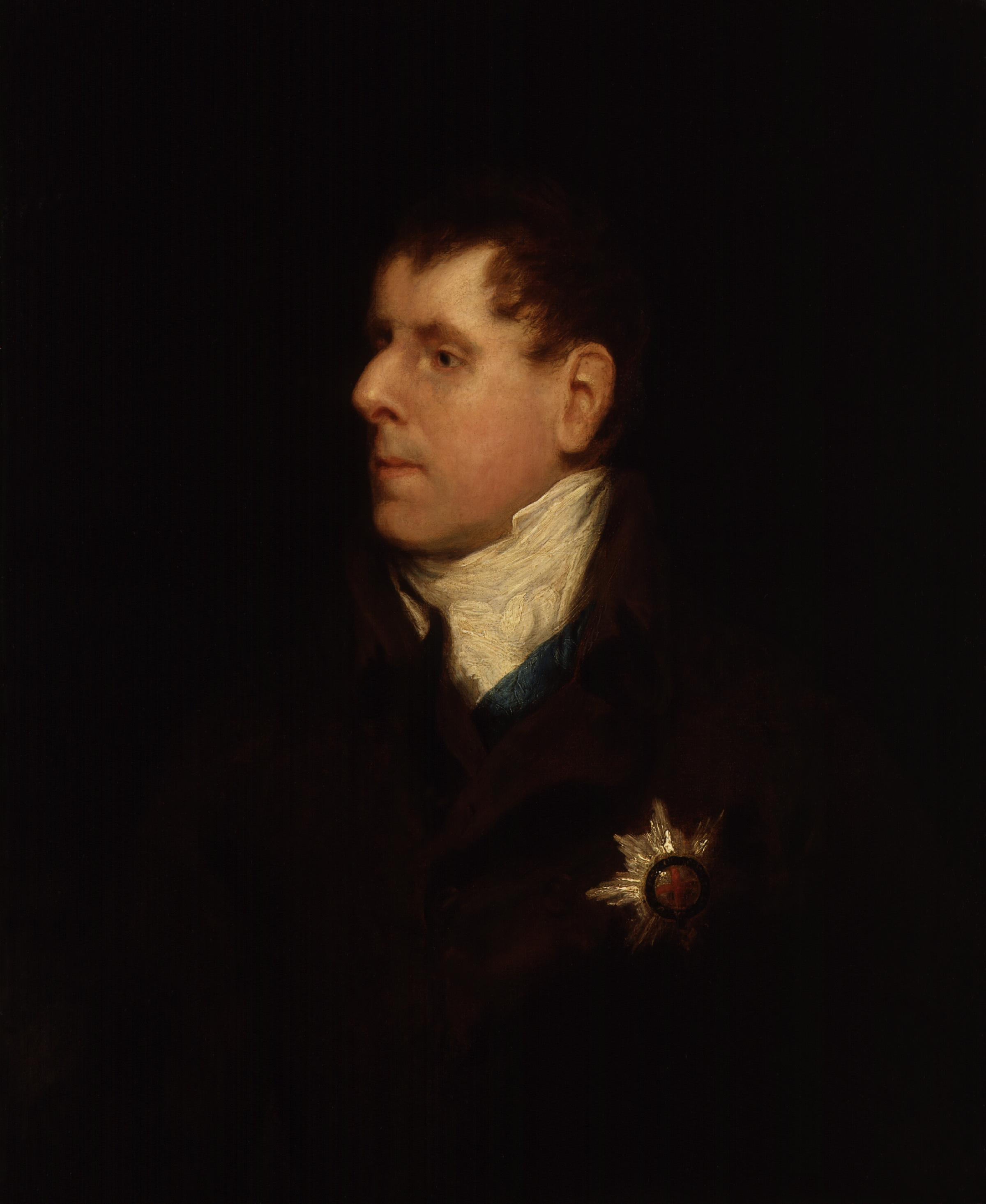
Portrait of the Marquess or Stafford by Thomas Phillips

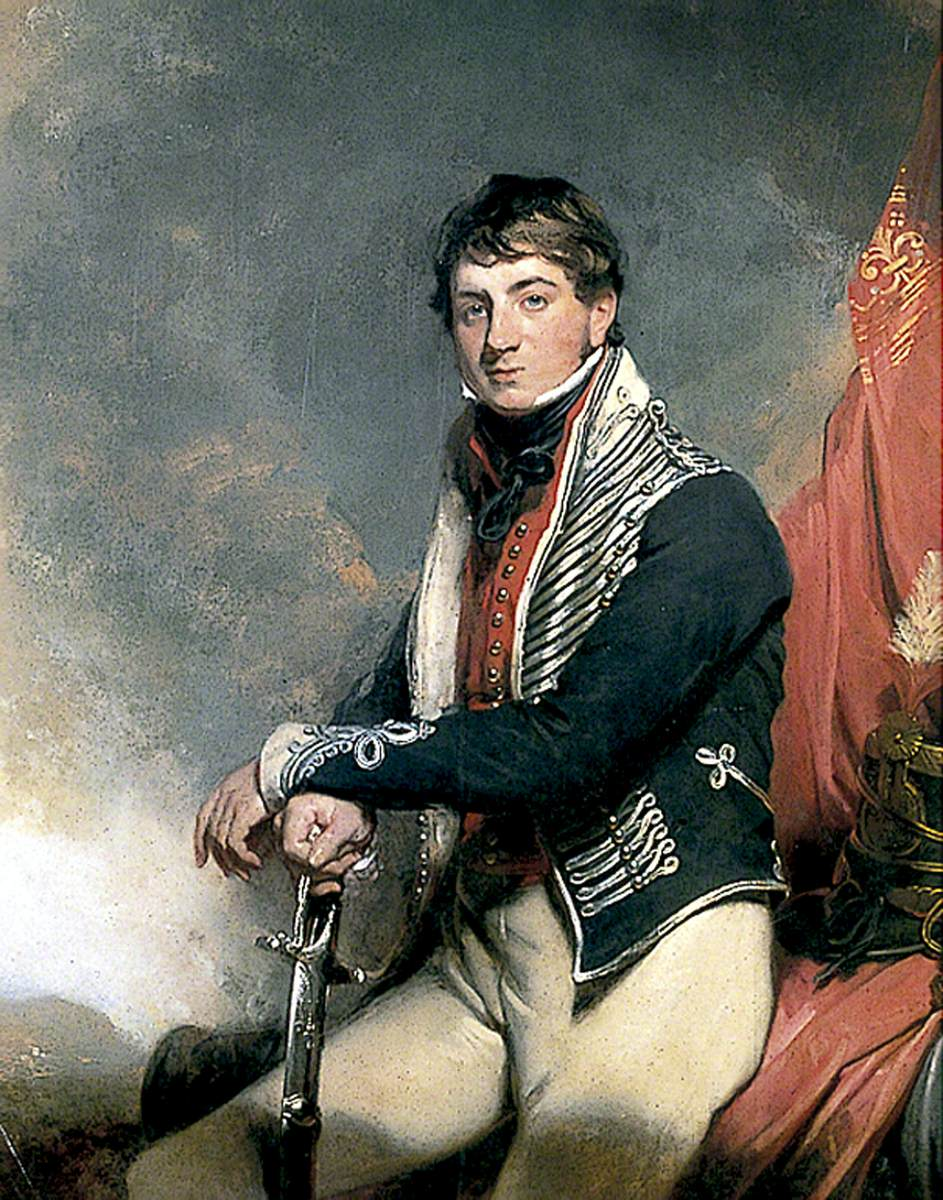
Portrait of Henry Vassall Webster by Martin Archer Shee

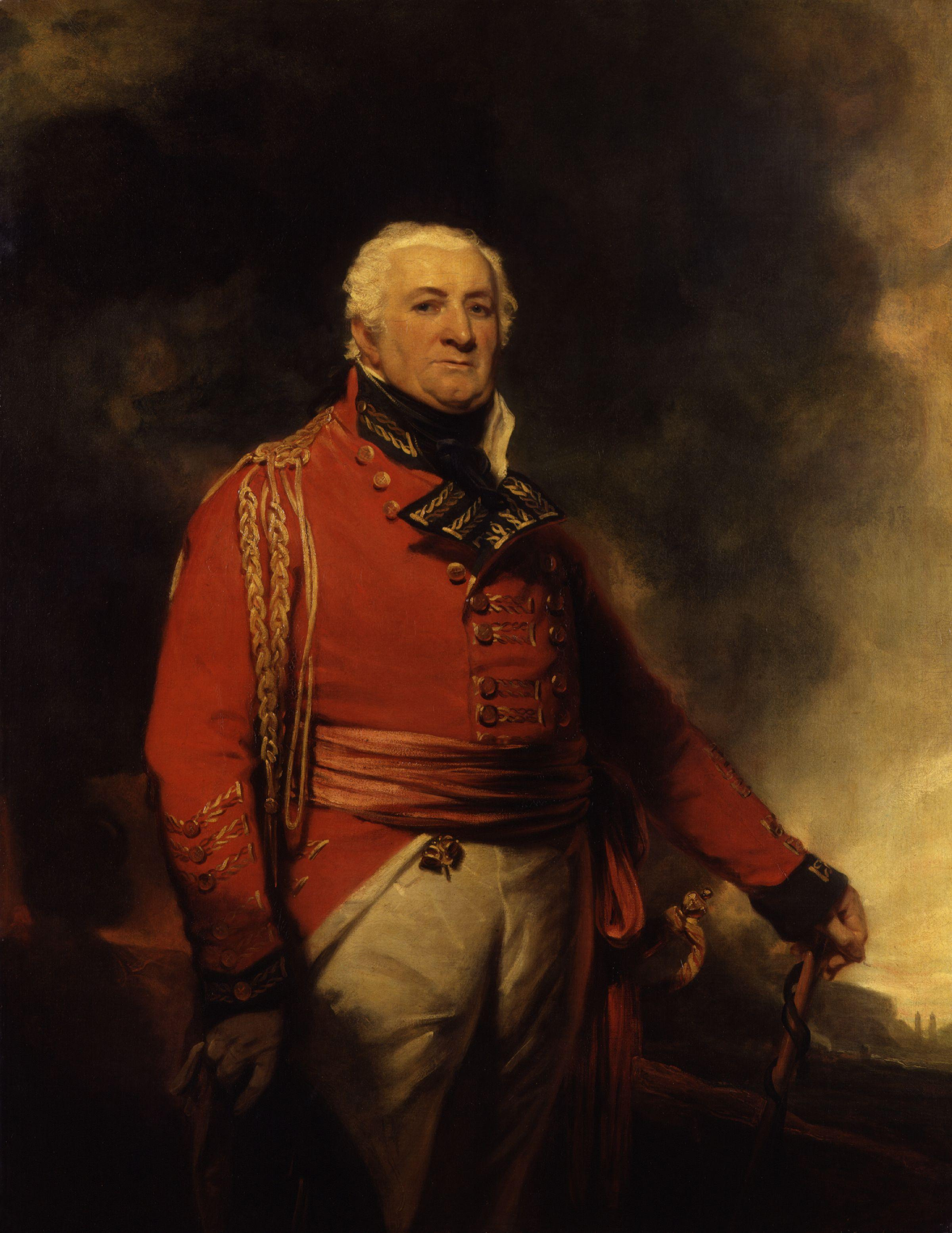
Portrait of William Popham by Martin Archer Shee

Portrait of Edward Kerrison by Martin Archer Shee

Portrait of William Manning by James Lonsdale

Portrait of Lord Seaforth by Henry Raeburn

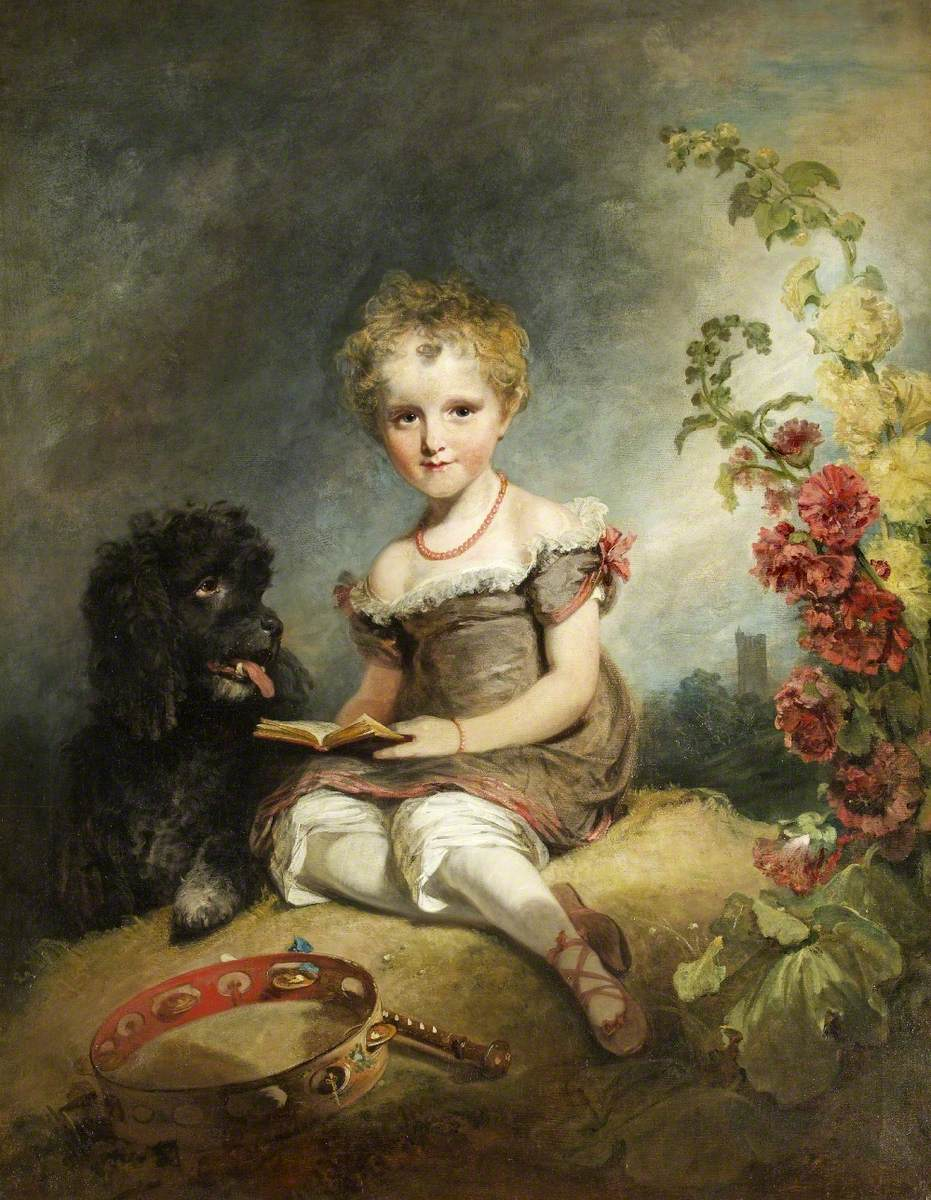
Portrait of Anne Hoare by William Owen

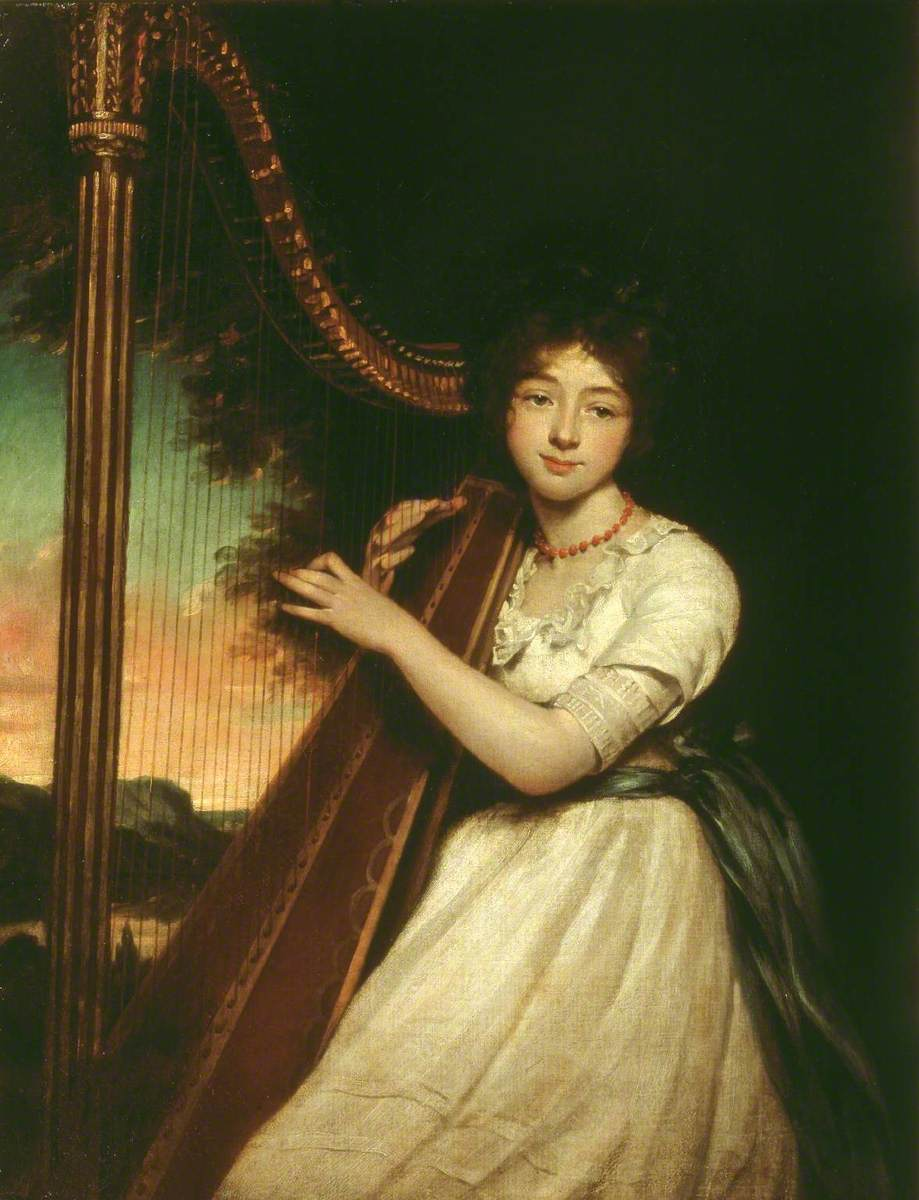
A Young Lady Playing the Harp by James Northcote

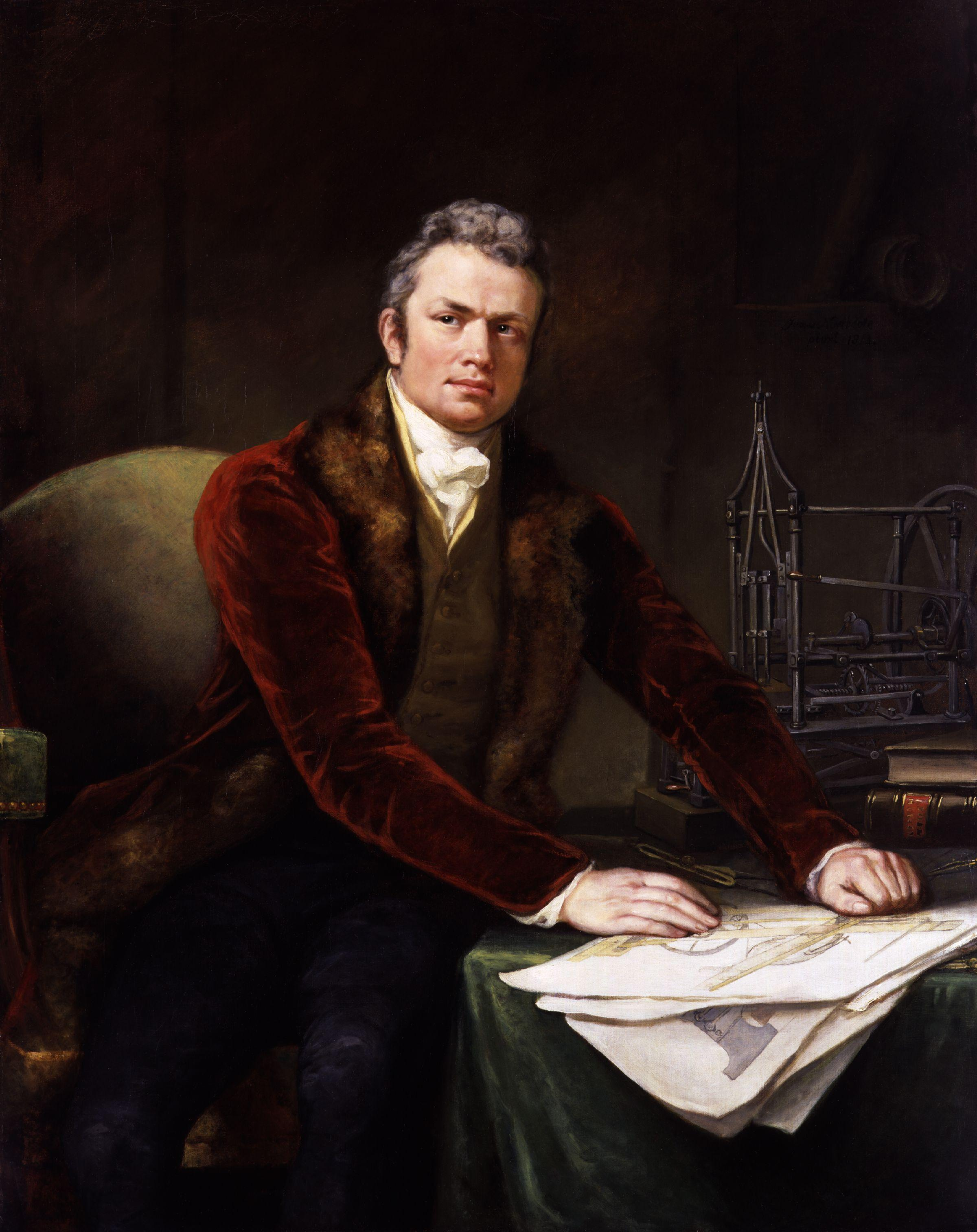
Portrait of Marc Isambard Brunel by James Northcote

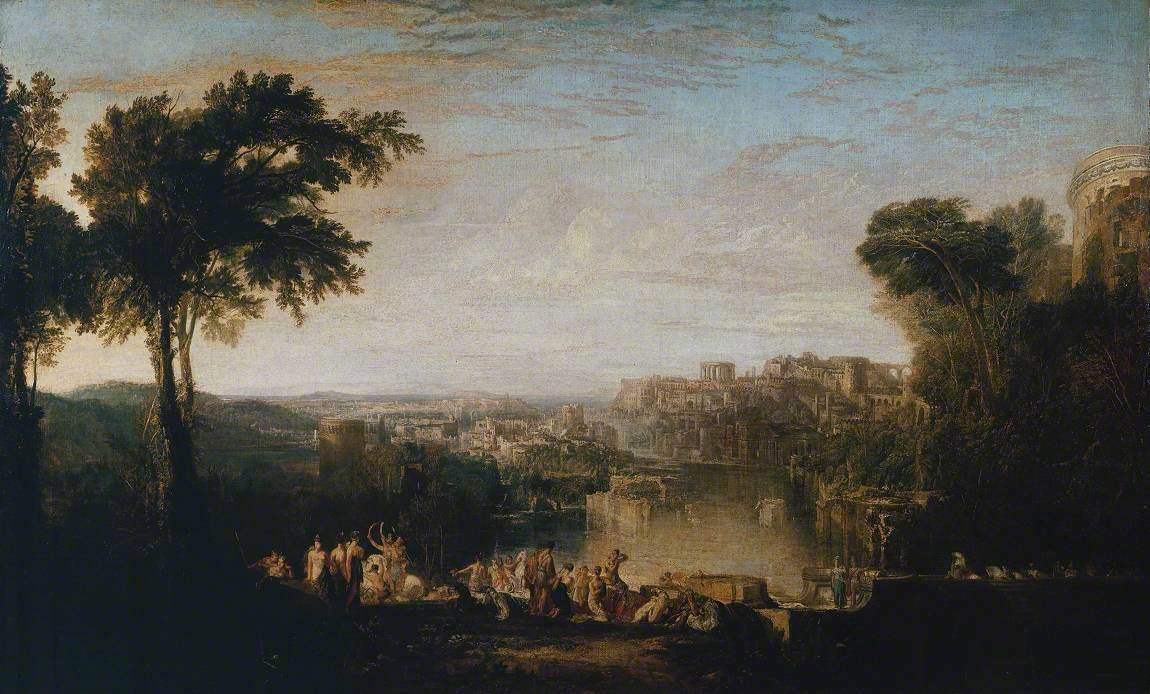
Dido and Aeneas by J.M.W. Turner

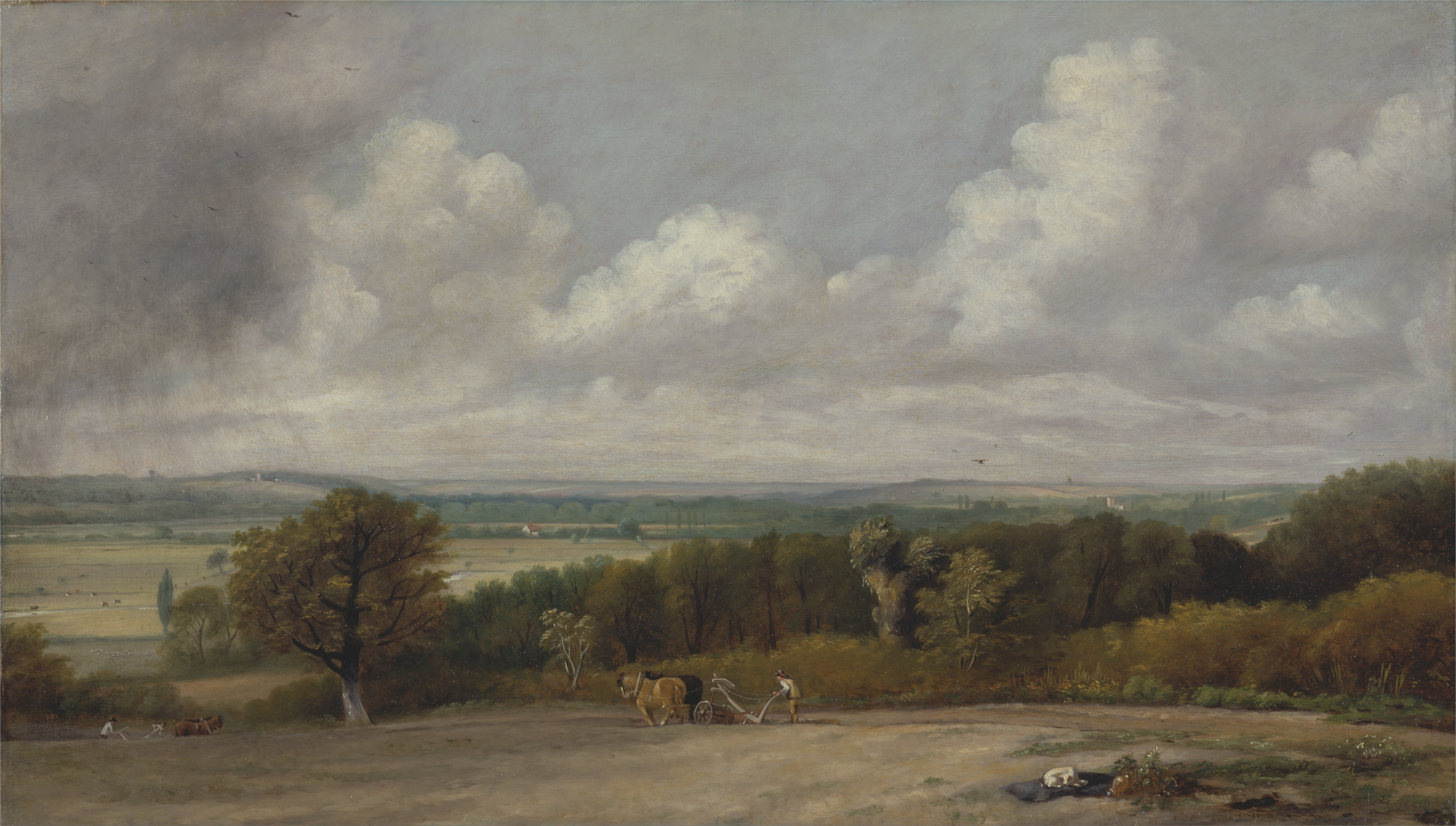
Ploughing Scene in Suffolk by John Constable. Later version of the painting exhibited in 1814.

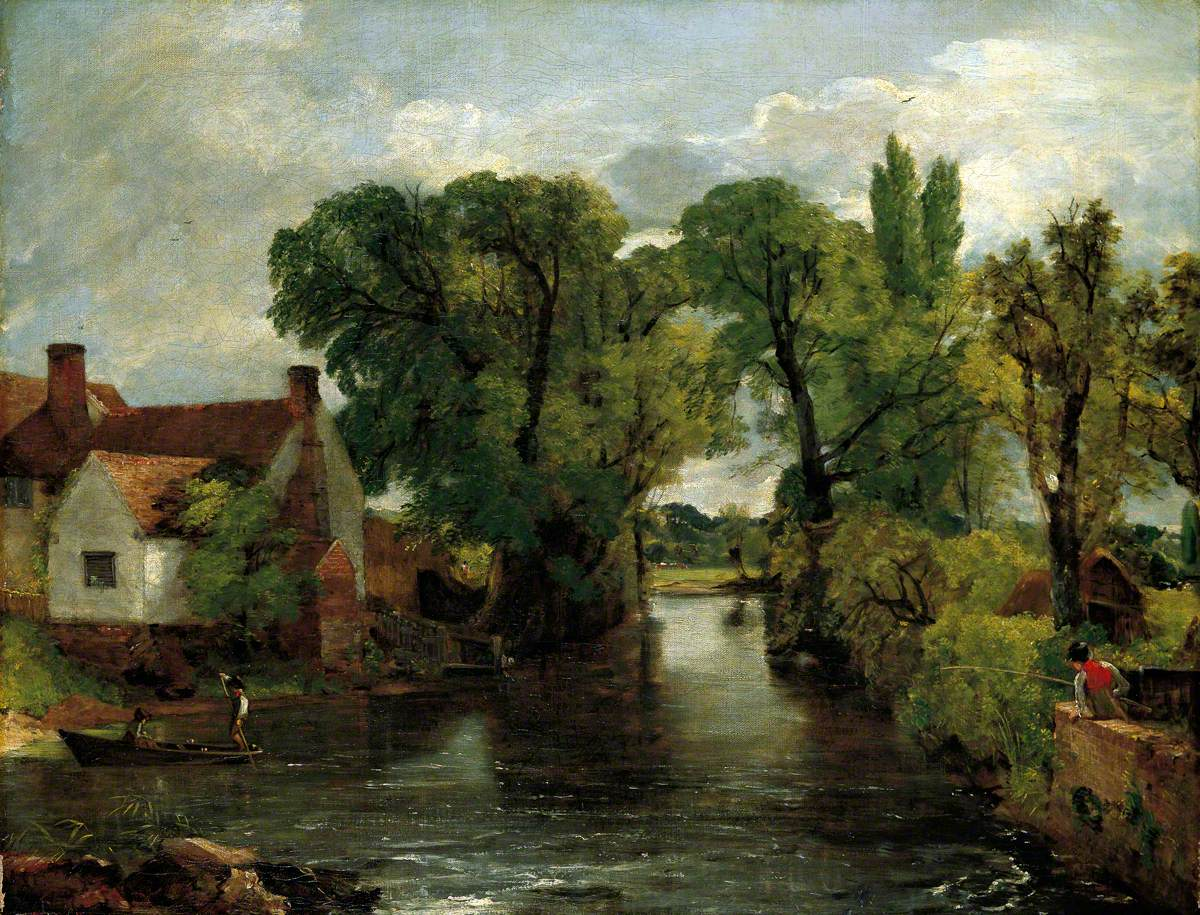
The Mill Stream by John Constable

The Refusal by David Wilkie

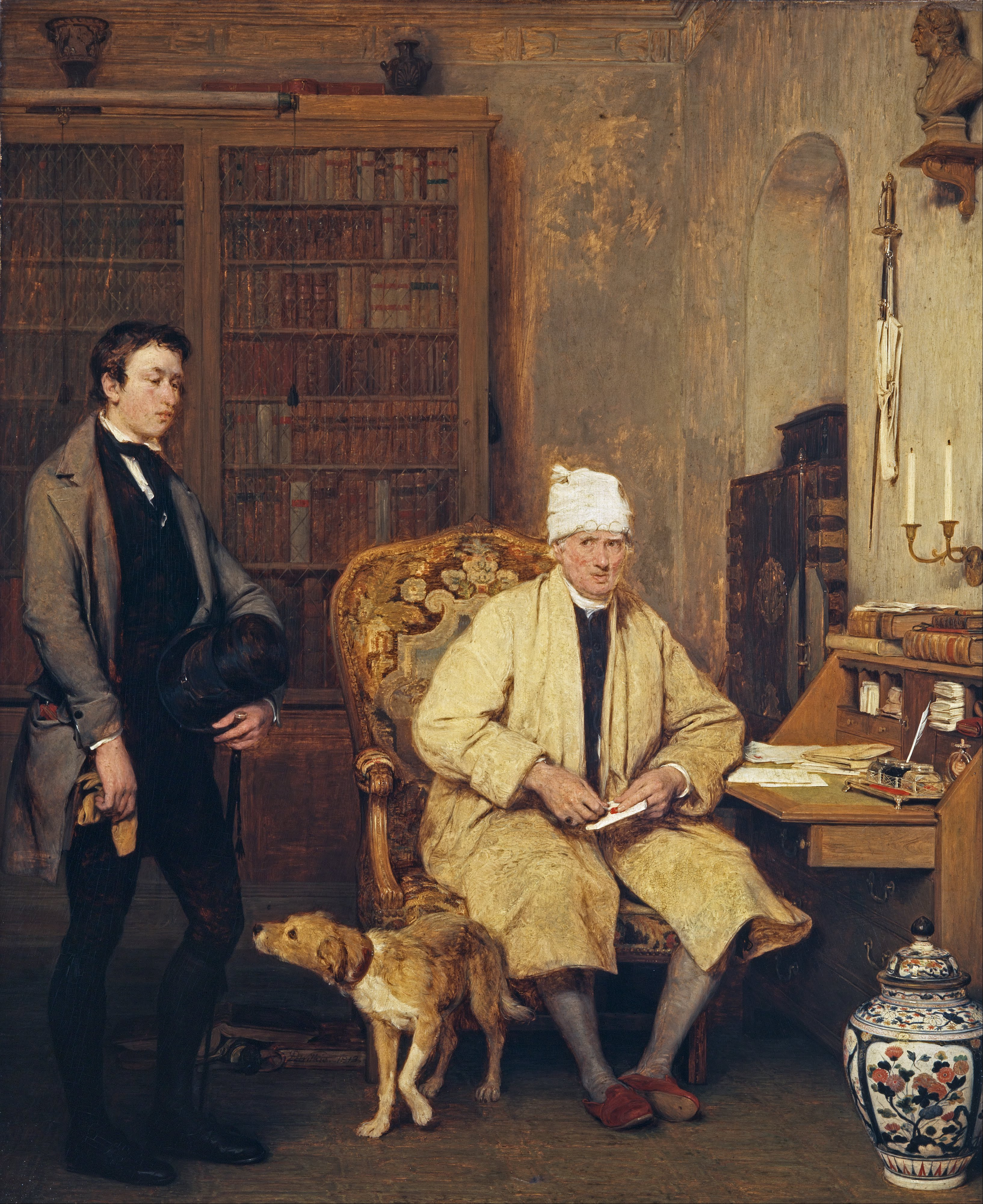
The Letter of Introduction by David Wilkie

Queen Philippa Supplicating King Edward to Spare the Lives of the Six Burghers of Calais by Edward Bird

The Cheat Detected by Edward Bird

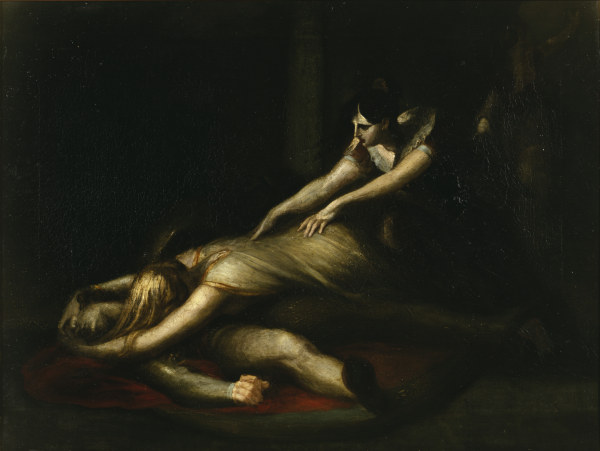
Kreimhild Mourns Siegfried by Henry Fuseli

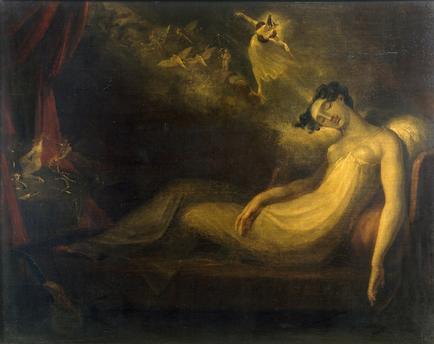
Queen Mab by Henry Fuseli

The Cottage Window by Samuel Woodforde

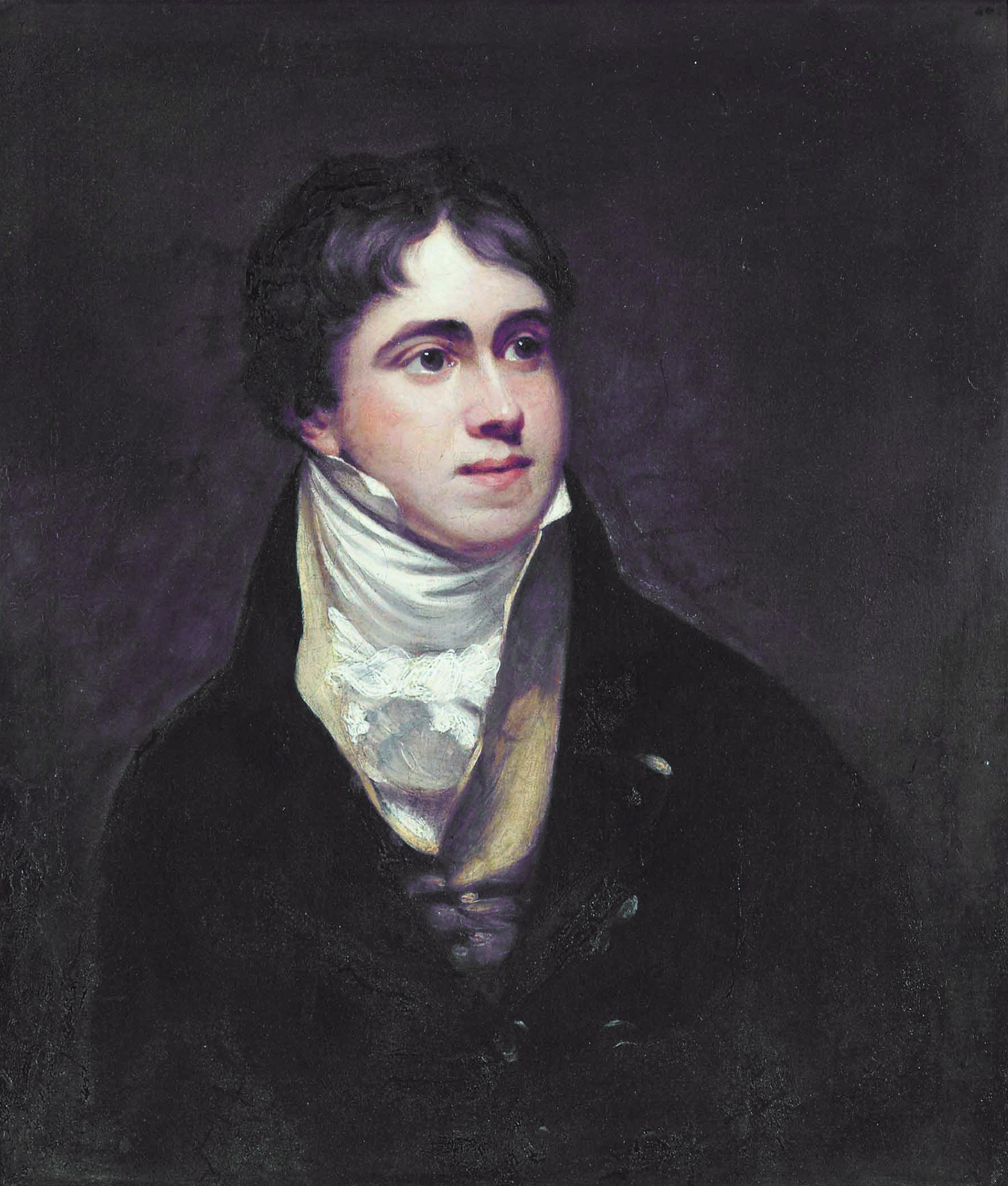
Portrait of Edward Gambier by William Beechey

== See also ==
- Salon of 1814, a contemporary French art exhibition held at the Louvre in Paris

== Bibliography ==
- Bailey, Anthony. J.M.W. Turner: Standing in the Sun. Tate Enterprises Ltd, 2013.
- Boime, Albert. A Social History of Modern Art, Volume 2: Art in an Age of Bonapartism, 1800-1815. University of Chicago Press, 1993.
- Tromans, Nicholas. David Wilkie: The People's Painter. Edinburgh University Press, 2007.
