= Lord Byron in Albanian Dress =

Painting by Thomas Phillips

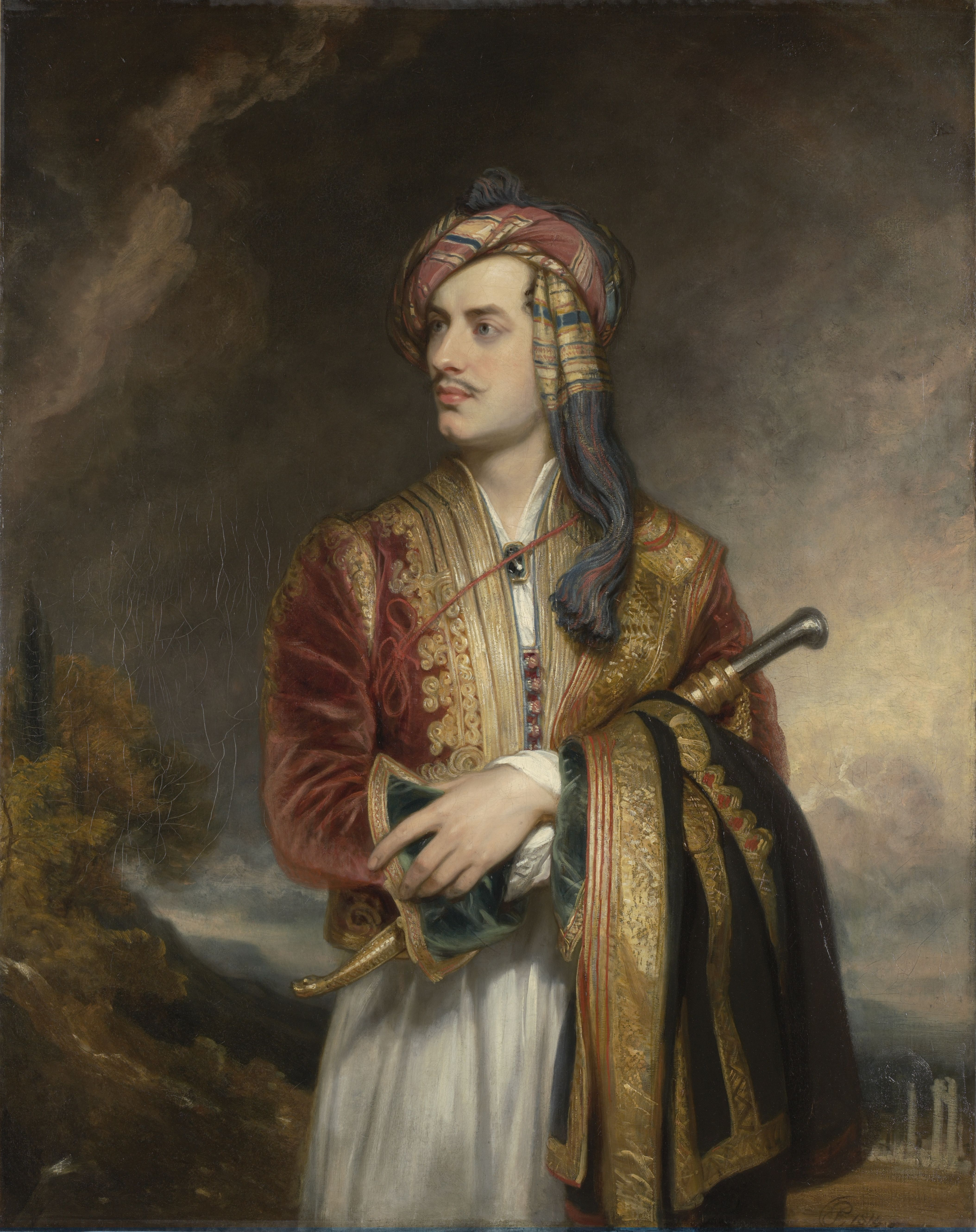
- Artist: Thomas Phillips
- Year: 1813
- Type: Oil on canvas, portrait
- Dimensions: 130 cm × 102 cm (50 in × 40.1 in)
- Location: Government Art Collection, Athens

Lord Byron in Albanian Dress is an oil on canvas portrait painting by the English artist Thomas Phillips, from 1813.

== History and description ==
It depicts the poet Lord Byron in the traditional Albanian costume including a Fustanella. Romantic in style, it celebrated the poet's reputation for exotic travel. Byron had travelled widely across Europe before returning to Britain where the success of his Childe Harold's Pilgrimage made him a celebrity. He had acquired the costume while staying in Albania or Epirus in 1809. The painting was likely done at the request of Byron's publisher John Murray. It was exhibited at the Royal Academy's Summer Exhibition of 1814 alongside the artist's more conventional Portrait of Lord Byron. Byron only wore this costume for the painting, and then gave it to his friend Margaret Mercer-Elphinstone.

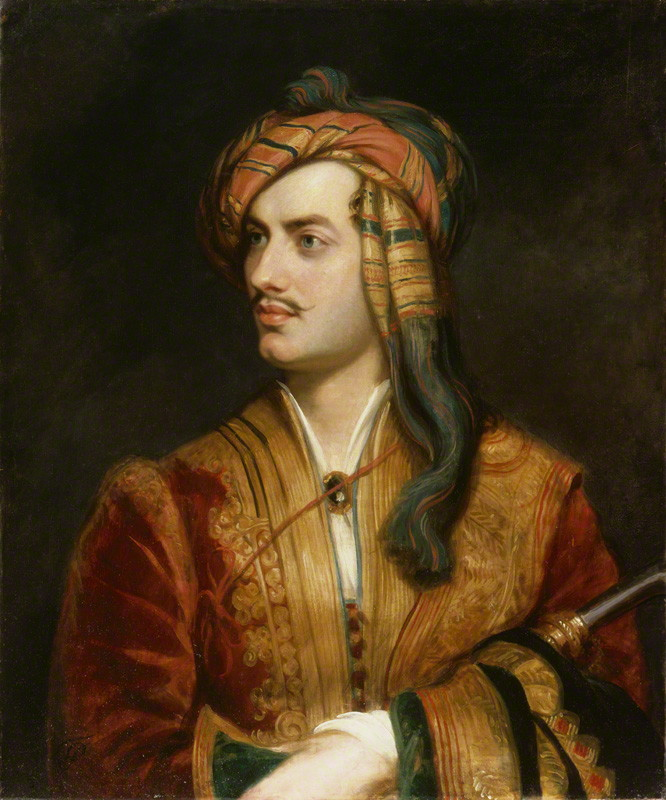
1835 version by Phillips in the National Portrait Gallery.

Today the work is part of the Government Art Collection and hangs in the British Embassy in Athens, due to Byron's close association with the Greek War of Independence. An 1835 version by Phillips, based on the original but focused on head and shoulders, is now in the National Portrait Gallery in London.

== Bibliography ==
- Burwick, Frederick. A History of Romantic Literature. John Wiley & Sons, 2019.
- Casaliggi, Carmen & Fermanis, Porscha. Romanticism: A Literary and Cultural History. Routledge, 2016.
- Elsie Robert. Historical Dictionary of Albania. Scarecrow Press, 2010.
- Paley, Morton D. Portraits of Coleridge. Clarendon Press, 1999.
- Peattie, Anthony. The Private Life of Lord Byron. Unbound Publishing, 2019.
- Shears Jonathon & Rawes, Alan. The Oxford Handbook of Lord Byron. Oxford University Press, 2024.
