= Helena Swanwick =

British suffragist, pacifist and writer (1864–1939)

Helena Maria Lucy Swanwick CH
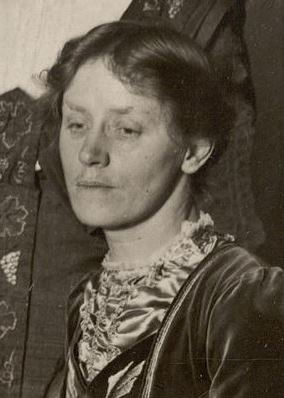
- Swanwick at a debate between suffragists and anti-suffragists in October 1909
- Born: Helena Maria Lucy Sickert; 30 January 1864; Munich, Kingdom of Bavaria
- Died: 16 November 1939 (aged 75); Maidenhead, Berkshire, England
- Other name: Helena Sickert
- Education: Notting Hill High School; Girton College, Cambridge
- Employer(s): Westfield College, Machester Guardian, The Common Cause
- Organization(s): Women's Social and Political Union, National Union of Women's Suffrage Societies, Union of Democratic Control, The Women's Peace Crusade, Women's International League for Peace and Freedom, Institute of International Affairs
- Known for: suffragist, pacifist and writer
- Political party: Labour Party (UK)
- Spouse: Frederick Swanwick (m. 1888)
- Father: Oswald Sickert
- Relatives: Richard Sheepshanks (maternal grandfather), Walter Sickert (brother)
- Awards: Order of the Companions of Honour

Helena Maria Lucy Swanwick CH (née Sickert; 30 January 1864 – 16 November 1939) was a Bavarian-born British suffragist, pacifist, internationalist and writer. Her autobiography, I Have Been Young (1935), gives an account of the non-militant women's suffrage campaign in the UK and of anti-war campaigning during the First World War, together with philosophical discussions of non-violence.

Swanwick's name and picture, along with 58 other women's suffrage supporters, are on the plinth of the statue of Millicent Fawcett in Parliament Square, London, unveiled in April 2018.

== Family ==
Born in Munich, Swanwick was the only daughter of Eleanor Louisa Moravia Henry and the Danish painter Oswald Sickert. Swanwick had five brothers including the painter Walter Sickert. Her maternal grandmother was an Irish dancer who became pregnant by the astronomer Richard Sheepshanks, a Fellow of Trinity College, Cambridge. When she was four years old, the family moved to Britain.

== Education and early career ==
She was educated at the Notting Hill High School, then attended a boarding school in France. She studied at Girton College, Cambridge, which was financed by a partial scholarship from her sympathetic godmother, as her parents did not see the point in a girl gaining a higher education and did not contribute to the cost.

Reading John Stuart Mill's The Subjection of Women (1869) during her studies influenced Swanwick to become a feminist. She was furious when her mother would not allow her to go out unchaperoned and how she was treated differently to her brothers.

Swanwick was appointed lecturer in psychology at Westfield College in 1885. She married the Manchester University lecturer and mathematician Frederick Swanwick in 1888. He had decided not to marry until he met her, and supported her in her activism.

Swanwick worked as a journalist, initially as a protégée of C. P. Scott, and wrote articles for the liberal paper the Manchester Guardian. She covered topics including book reviews and domestic matters, and wrote for the Country Diary column.

== Suffrage ==
After reading about Christabel Pankhurst and Annie Kenney's protest and unfurling a banner declaring "Votes for Women" at the Manchester Free Trade Hall in October 1905, Swanwick joined the Women's Social and Political Union (WSPU) and later wrote that her "heart rose up in support of their revolt." In 1906, Swanwick left the WSPU and joined the National Union of Women's Suffrage Societies (NUWSS), because of her belief in non-violence and as she found that she could not work with the Pankhurts.

Quickly becoming prominent within the NUWSS, Swanwick was an active speaker who addressed 150 meetings across England and Scotland in 1908 and participated in a debate between suffrage and anti-suffrage societies at the Free Trade Hall, Manchester, in October 1909. She served as the first editor and manager of the NUWSS weekly journal, The Common Cause, from 1909 to 1912. She was paid a salary of £200, and after her husband retired from teaching they moved to London so that the paper could be produced in the capital.

Despite her pacifist views, she wrote to the Manchester Guardian in November 1910, on behalf of the NUWSS, in defence of the suffragettes arrested during the Battle of Downing Street. While regretting the suffragettes' violence, she blamed the confrontation on Prime Minister H. H. Asquith's "continual evasions" on the matter of women's suffrage, calling him a "past-master in evasion". She wrote to Scott on 19 July 1912 that "I have much sympathy for feminine rebellion. For their claptrap and dishonesty, for their persecution and terrorism, I have loathing."

During this period she also wrote The Future of the Women's Movement (1913). Swanwick remained on the NUWSS Executive until 1915, when, together with other suffragists as Catherine Marshall and Agnes Maude Royden, she resigned from the NUWSS over its refusal to send delegates to the International Women's Congress at the Hague.

== Pacifism ==
On the outbreak of World War I, Swanwick began campaigning for a negotiated peace, attended protests urging women to strike against the sudden war and argued that militarism directly involved the subjection of women. From 1914, she was one of the founding members of the Union of Democratic Control (UDC) and their first female member. She described the movement as not an organisation to "stop the war" but to "plan for peace." She wrote pamphlets for the UDC such as Women and War (1915), The War in its Effect upon Women (1916) and Builders of Peace, Being Ten Years History of the Union of Democratic Control (1924), and edited their journal Foreign Affairs. As a pacifist, Swanwick also joined the Women's Peace Crusade.

G. K. Chesterton criticised Swanwick's pacifism in the 2 September 1916 issue of Illustrated London News, writing that: "Mrs. Swanwick... has recently declared that there must be no punishment for the responsible Prussian. She puts it specifically on the ground that they were promised, or promised themselves, the conquest of the whole world; and they have not got it. This, she says, will be punishment enough. If I were to propose, to the group which is supposed to inspire the Pacifist propaganda, that a man who burgled their strong boxes or pilfered their petty cash should suffer no punishment beyond failing to get the money, they would very logically ask me if I was an Anarchist." (Note: Chesterton, G. K. (2 September 1916). "'Topsy-turvydom' | Illustrated London News". G.K. WEEKLY. First section of "Our Notebook" article. Free to access.)

== Post-war work and death ==
After the war she maintained her internationalist views, opposing the "unjust and unsustainable" terms of the Treaty of Versailles. In her autobiography I Have Been Young she reflected on the peace negotiations at the end of World War I, writing that "when I hear that women are unfit to be diplomats I wonder by what standards of duplicity and frivolity they could possibly prove themselves inferior to the men who represented the victors at Versailles."

In April 1915, Aletta Jacobs, a suffragist in the Netherlands, invited suffrage members from around the world to an International Congress of Women in The Hague. At the conference, the Women's International League for Peace and Freedom (WILPF) was formed and Swanswick was a founding member and chairwoman. Other notable leading members of WILPF in Britain included Kathleen Courtney, Isabella Ford, Margaret Hills, Catherine Marshall, Emmeline Pethick-Lawrence, Maude Royden and Ethel Snowdon. Swanwick was among the British delegation to the second conference of the WILPF in Zurich in 1919. She also argued that the WILPF should become popularised through education and public debate and wrote in a 1919 essay that she hoped that the organisation would "rouse the great mass of people in every country to take an interest in these great matters."

When the political think thank British Institute of International Affairs (known as Chatham House) was founded in 1920, Swanwick became a member. Alongside Arthur Henderson, Gilbert Murray, and Charles Roden Buxton, Swanwick served as a British delegate to the League of Nations Assembly in Geneva in 1924. She observed that only one woman headed a section of the League, Rachel Crowdy, and reflected on how due to sexist gender stereotypes it was assumed that women were only educated about feminine concerns such as refugees, the protection of children, trafficking women, alcoholism and opium, whereas she wanted to discuss international security questions, disarmament and sanctions.

Swanwick also contributed to the magazine Time and Tide, writing in 1927 that "the earlier struggles of women for emancipation necessarily take the form of beating at the closed doors of life. Till these are opened and we can see for ourselves what there is of knowledge and opportunity we cannot know how much we can put to good use. Many of these doors are still closed, but far more have been opened even in my lifetime than, as a girl, I should have ventured to hope."

In 1928, Swanwick participated in a debate hosted by the National Peace Council in London, where she discussed international sanctions as a means of preventing war and arguing that it risked unjustified application of force on civilians. She advocated for the development of peaceful tribunals for the settlement of international disputes. Swanwick became Vice President of the League of Nations Union, and served as a United Kingdom delegate to the League of Nations Assembly for the second time, where she became acquainted with Winifrid Holtby and Vera Brittain.

Swanwick was appointed to the Order of the Companions of Honour in the New Years' Honours of 1931, in recognition of her work for peace and the enfranchisement of women. She was also a member of the Labour Party.

Swanwick retired from public life in 1931, but continued to write. She became increasingly depressed throughout the 1930s by the growing attitude of preparedness towards fascist violence, a depression that deepened after the death of her husband in 1934. In November 1939, following the outbreak of the Second World War, she died by suicide with an overdose of veronal at her home in Maidenhead, Berkshire.

== Selected works ==
- The Small Town Garden (1907)
- The Future of the Women's Movement (1913)
- The War in its Effect upon Women (1916)
- Women in the Socialist State (1921)
- Builders of Peace, Being Ten Years History of the Union of Democratic Control (1924)
- Labour's foreign policy: what has been and what might be (1929)
- Frankenstein and His Monster: Aviation for World War Service (1934)
- I Have Been Young, autobiography, (1935).
- Collective Insecurity (1937)
- The Roots of Peace: A Sequel to Collective Insecurity, Being an Essay on Some of the Uses, Condition (1938)

== See also ==
- List of British suffragists and suffragettes
- List of peace activists
