= Letter of introduction =

Type of formal communication

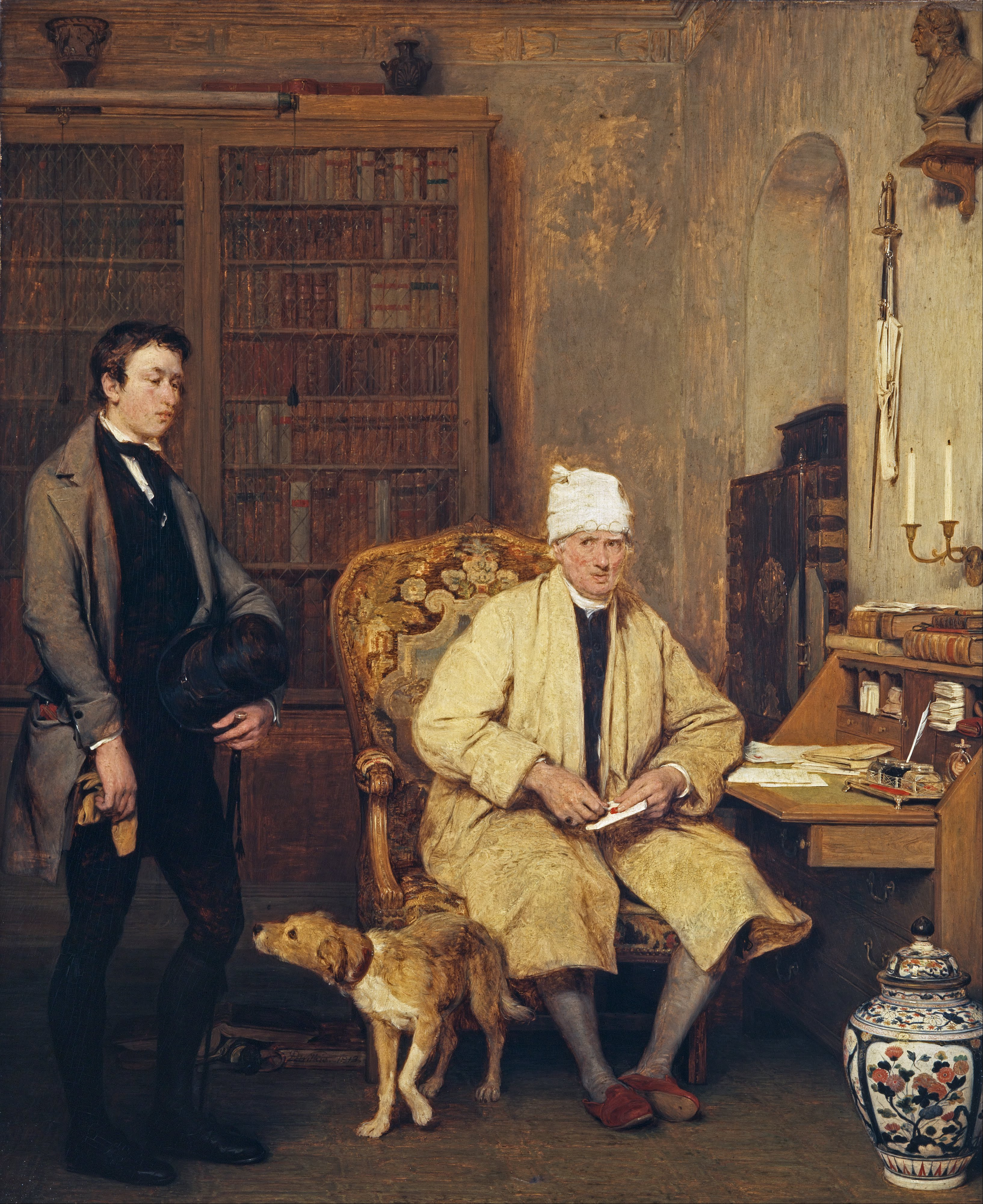
The Letter of Introduction, 1813, represents David Wilkie's own unfortunate experience of presenting such a letter to a prospective patron.

The letter of introduction, along with the visiting card, was an important part of polite social interaction in the 18th and 19th centuries. It remains important in formal situations, such as an ambassador presenting his or her credentials (a letter of credence), and in certain business circles.

In general, a person would not interact socially with others unless they had been properly introduced, whether in person or by letter. A person of lower social status would request a patron of higher social status to write a letter of introduction to a third party, also of higher social status than the first person. It was important to observe the niceties of etiquette in requesting, writing and presenting such letters, in such matters as the quality of the paper used, and whether it would be delivered unsealed to allow the requesting party to read it. For example, it was best practice to deliver a letter of introduction to the intended recipient with a visiting card, to allow the recipient to reciprocate by calling upon the sender the next day.

When Benjamin Franklin served as Ambassador to France (1776–1785) he was besieged by those traveling to America who desired letters of introduction, and he drafted the following letter:

The bearer of this, who is going to America, presses me to give him a letter of recommendation, though I know nothing of him, not even his name. This may seem extraordinary, but I assure you that it is not uncommon here. Sometimes, indeed, one unknown person brings another, equally unknown, to recommend him; and sometimes they recommend one another. As to this gentleman, I must refer you to himself for his character and merits, with which he is certainly better acquainted than I can possibly be. I recommend him, however, to those civilities which every stranger of whom one knows no harm has a right to; and I request you will do him all good offices.

== See also ==
- Letter of recommendation
