= John Sheepshanks =

John Sheepshanks may refer to:

- John Sheepshanks (priest) (1765-1844), Archdeacon of Cornwall and vicar of St Gluvias
- John Sheepshanks (art collector) (1787–1863), British manufacturer and art collector
- John Sheepshanks (bishop) (1834–1912), English Anglican bishop
