= Lady Leicester as Hope =

Painting by Thomas Lawrence

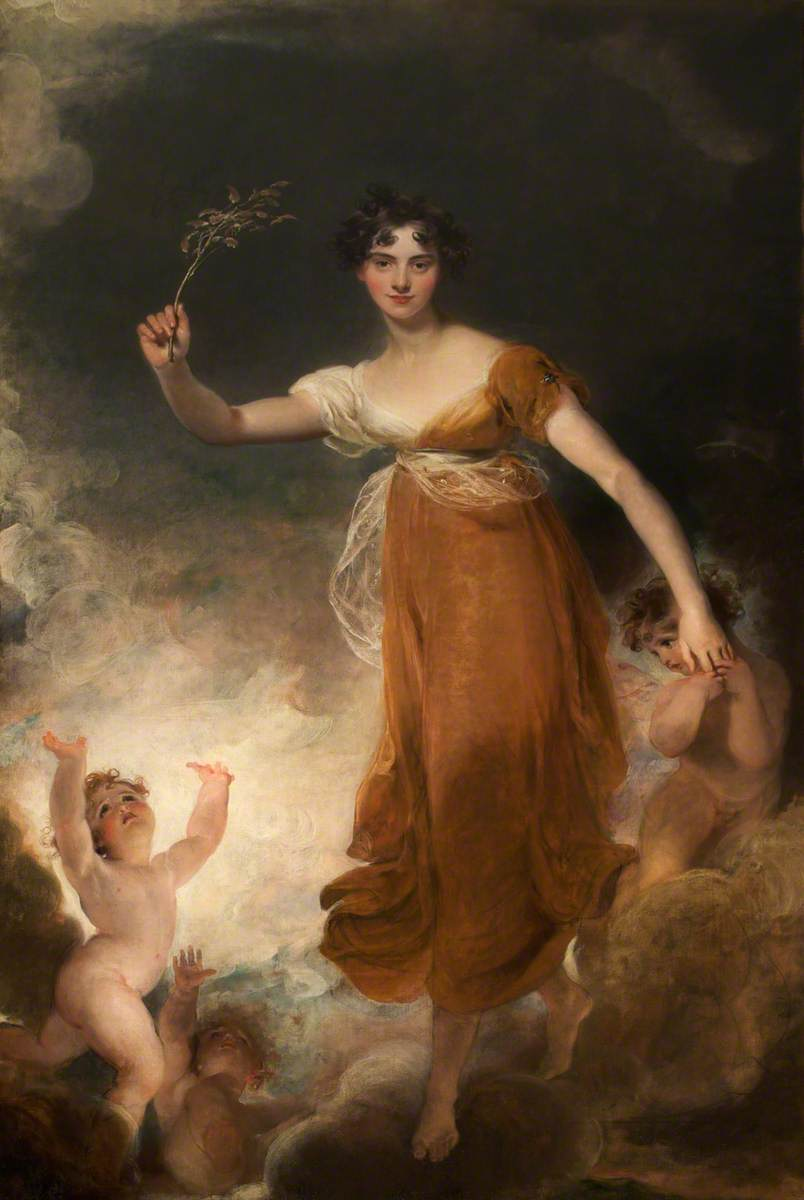
- Artist: Thomas Lawrence
- Year: c.1814
- Type: Oil on canvas, portrait painting
- Dimensions: 243.9 cm × 147.3 cm (96.0 in × 58.0 in)
- Location: Tabley House, Cheshire

Lady Leicester as Hope is an 1814 portrait painting by the British artist Thomas Lawrence. It depicts the English aristocrat Georgiana Leicester the wife Sir John Leicester a noted landowner and art collector who she had married in 1810. It depicts her allegorically in the character of Hope, shown standing on a cloud and surrounded by cherubs. It emphasis both her youth and her situation as a future mother.

Considerably younger than her first husband she outlived him and in 1828 controversially married his nephew the Reverend Frederick Leicester. Thomas Lawrence was the premeenint portraitists of the Regency. The picture was commissioned by her husband in 1811. The painting was displayed at the Royal Academy Exhibition of 1814 held at Somerset House in London. It also featured at the Art Treasures Exhibition of Manchester in 1857. The work hangs at Tabley House in Cheshire, having been acquired by the University of Manchester in 1976.

A mezzotint was produced inspired by the painting by the engraver Henry Hoppner Meyer in 1823.

== Bibliography ==
- Pergam, Elizabeth A. The Manchester Art Treasures Exhibition of 1857. Routledge, 2017.
- Wilton, Andrew. The Swagger Portrait: Grand Manner Portraiture in Britain from Van Dyck to Augustus John, 1630-1930. Tate Gallery, 1992.
