= The Cheat Detected =

Painting by Edward Bird

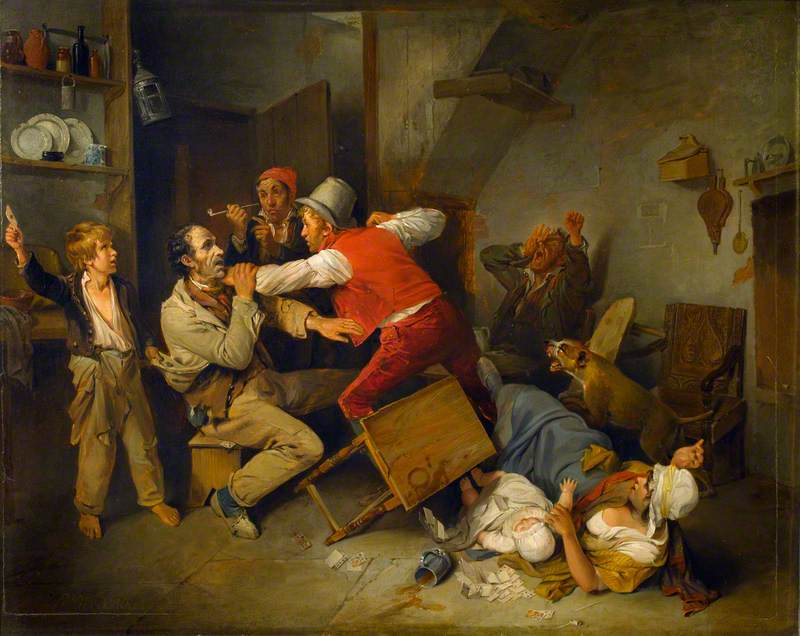
- Artist: Edward Bird
- Year: 1814
- Type: Oil on panel, genre painting
- Dimensions: 43 cm × 56 cm (17 in × 22 in)
- Location: Sir John Soane's Museum, London

The Cheat Detected is an oil painting on panel by the British artist Edward Bird, from 1814. It hangs now in Sir John Soane's Museum, in Lincoln's Inn Fields, London.

== History and description ==
It depicts a fight breaking out when it is discovered that one of the players in a card game has been cheating. The scene is chaotic. A man in the red coat attacks the presumed cheater. A woman with her baby, meanwhile, had felt to the ground. A dog barks, while a man, in the background, has been hit in the face. A child shows the cheating chard, as a proof, at the left.

It was part of the tradition of genre paintings popular in the Regency era produced by artists such as Bird and David Wilkie, that harked back to scenes of everyday life produced by the Old Masters during the Dutch Golden Age.

The painting was displayed at the Royal Academy Exhibition of 1814 held at Somerset House in London. His friend and protégé, Edward Villiers Rippingille, a fellow member of the Bristol School, submitted a different painting with the same title and subject. It was acquired by the architect and art collector John Soane, a Bird's fellow member of the Royal Academy, following his death in 1819. It hangs now in Sir John Soane's Museum, in Lincoln's Inn Fields, London.

== Bibliography ==
- Richardson, Sarah. Edward Bird, 1772-1819. Wolverhampton Art Gallery, 1982.
- Solkin, David H. Painting Out of the Ordinary: Modernity and the Art of Everyday Life in Nineteenth-century Britain. Yale University Press, 2008.
