= Anne Sheepshanks =

British astronomical benefactor (1794–1876)

- Born: April 2, 1789; Leeds, England
- Died: February 8, 1876 (aged 86); Reading, Berkshire, England
- Occupation: Astronomical benefactor

Anne Sheepshanks (2 April 1789 – 8 February 1876) was a British astronomical benefactor.

== Life ==
Sheepshanks was born in Leeds on 2 April 1789. She was the daughter of Joseph and Ann Sheepshanks. Her mother was from Kendal and her father was a cloth manufacturer. Her brothers were John and Richard Sheepshanks. In 1819, her brother Richard returned from being tenth wrangler and after obtaining his master's degree at Trinity College, Cambridge. Sheepshanks went to live with him. When he died unmarried in Reading in 1855 she was his heir. She gave 196 books from her brother's book collection to the Royal Astronomical Society.

Sheepshanks gave £10,000 to the Cambridge Observatory. This fund was used to purchase a modern photographic telescope at the observatory, which was named in her honour, and also to establish the Sheepshanks Exhibition. She became an honorary member of the Royal Astronomical Society. The crater Sheepshanks on the Moon is also named after her, one of the few lunar craters with a female eponym.
