= The Mill Stream =

Painting by John Constable

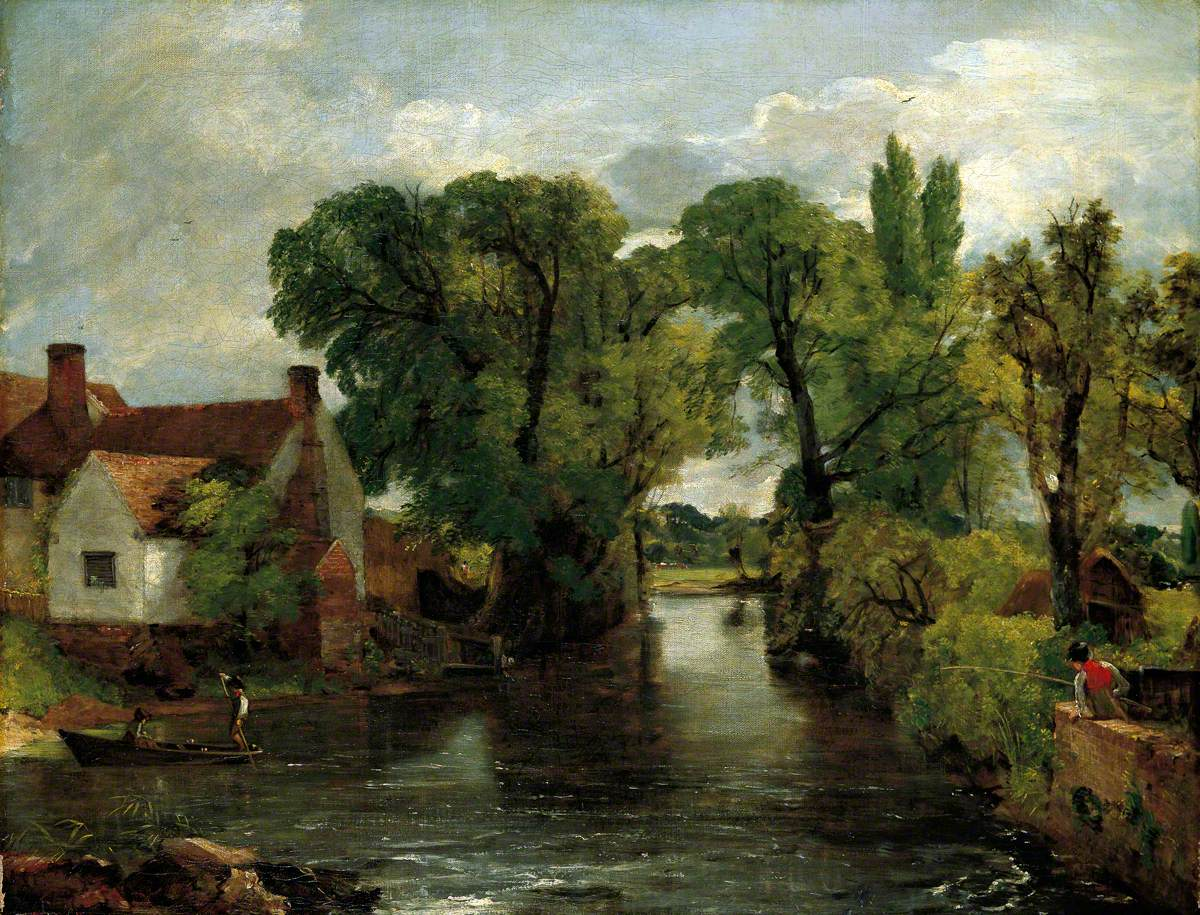
- Artist: John Constable
- Year: 1814
- Type: Oil on canvas, landscape painting
- Dimensions: 71.1 cm × 91.5 cm (28.0 in × 36.0 in)
- Location: Christchurch Mansion, Ipswich

The Mill Stream is an 1814 landscape painting by the British artist John Constable. It features a view of the mill stream by Willy Lott's Cottage in Flatford in Suffolk and the ferry across it. Constable later used a similar view for one of his best-known works The Hay Wain in 1821.

The painting was displayed at the Royal Academy Exhibition of 1814 at Somerset House in London. Today the work is in the collection of Christchurch Mansion overseen by the Colchester and Ipswich Museums Service. The Tate Britain in London has an oil sketch painted in preparation for the painting.

== See also ==
- List of paintings by John Constable

== Bibliography ==
- Allhusen, Edward. John Constable. Medici Society, 1976.
- Bailey, Anthony. John Constable: A Kingdom of his Own. Random House, 2012.
- Charles, Victoria. Constable. Parkstone International, 2015.
- Hamilton, James. Constable: A Portrait. Hachette UK, 2022.
- Smart, Alastair. Constable and His Country. Elek, 1976.
