= Dido and Aeneas (painting) =

Painting by J. M. W. Turner

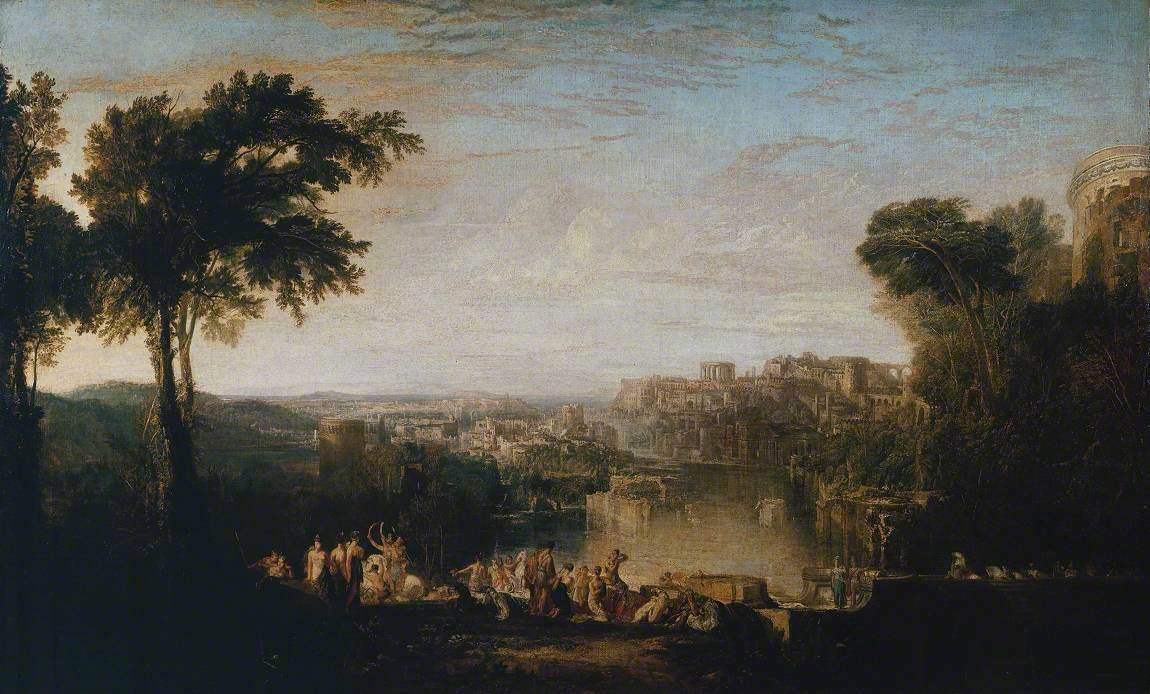
- Artist: J. M. W. Turner
- Year: 1814
- Type: Oil on canvas, history
- Dimensions: 237.2 cm × 146 cm (93.4 in × 57 in)
- Location: Tate Britain, London
- Website: www.tate.org.uk/...n00494

Dido and Aeneas is an 1814 history painting by the British painter J.M.W. Turner that portrays a scene inspired by the Aeneid by the Roman poet Virgil. Turner depicts a panoramic view of the city of Ancient Carthage with the lovers Dido and Aeneas in the bottom right.

Although possibly started as early as 1805, Turner displayed the work in 1814 at the Royal Academy's Summer Exhibition of 1814 at Somerset House. The story of Aeneas was a favourite of Turner and he returned to It again near the end of his career at the Royal Academy Exhibition of 1850.

Today the painting is in the collection of the Tate Britain,having been part of the Turner Bequest of 1856.

== See also ==
- List of paintings by J. M. W. Turner

== Bibliography ==
- Bailey, Anthony. J.M.W. Turner: Standing in the Sun. Tate Enterprises Ltd, 2013.
- Costello, Leo. J.M.W. Turner and the Subject of History. Taylor and Francis, 2017.
- Finley, Gerald. Angel in the Sun; Turner's Vision of History. McGill-Queen's University Press, 1999.
