= Sheepshanks (crater) =

Crater on the Moon

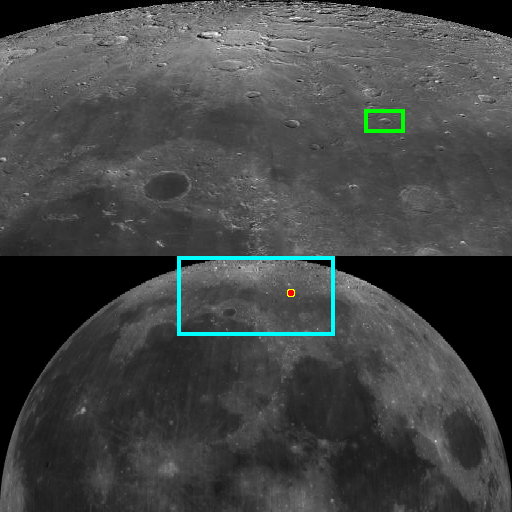
- Location of the lunar crater Sheepshanks.
- Coordinates: 59.2°N 16.9°E
- Diameter: 25 km
- Depth: 2.0 km
- Colongitude: 17° at sunrise
- Eponym: Anne Sheepshanks

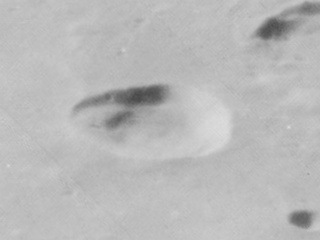
Oblique view from Lunar Orbiter 4

Sheepshanks is a small lunar impact crater located near the northern edge of Mare Frigoris. Due south on the opposite shore is the prominent crater Aristoteles while to the north is C. Mayer. Sheepshanks appears somewhat oblong due to foreshortening, but it is actually nearly circular. The inner walls slope down to a ring of material around the inner floor. There is a small craterlet along the southeastern inner wall. The crater is otherwise not particularly eroded by impacts.

About 30 kilometres (19 mi) to the southeast of the crater rim is the western end of the narrow rille named Rima Sheepshanks. This cleft extends for a distance of about 200 kilometres (120 mi) across the surface of the mare, running to the east-northeast.

The craters are named for Anne Sheepshanks who was a benefactor to the Royal Astronomical Society. Despite being overlooked for membership of the society her contribution is recorded in the naming of these craters.

== Satellite craters ==
By convention these features are identified on lunar maps by placing the letter on the side of the crater midpoint that is closest to Sheepshanks.

| Sheepshanks | Latitude | Longitude | Diameter |
|---|---|---|---|
| A | 60.0° N | 19.0° E | 7 km |
| B | 60.3° N | 21.1° E | 5 km |
| C | 57.0° N | 18.1° E | 11 km |
