= The Pedlar (Wilkie) =

Painting by David Wilkie

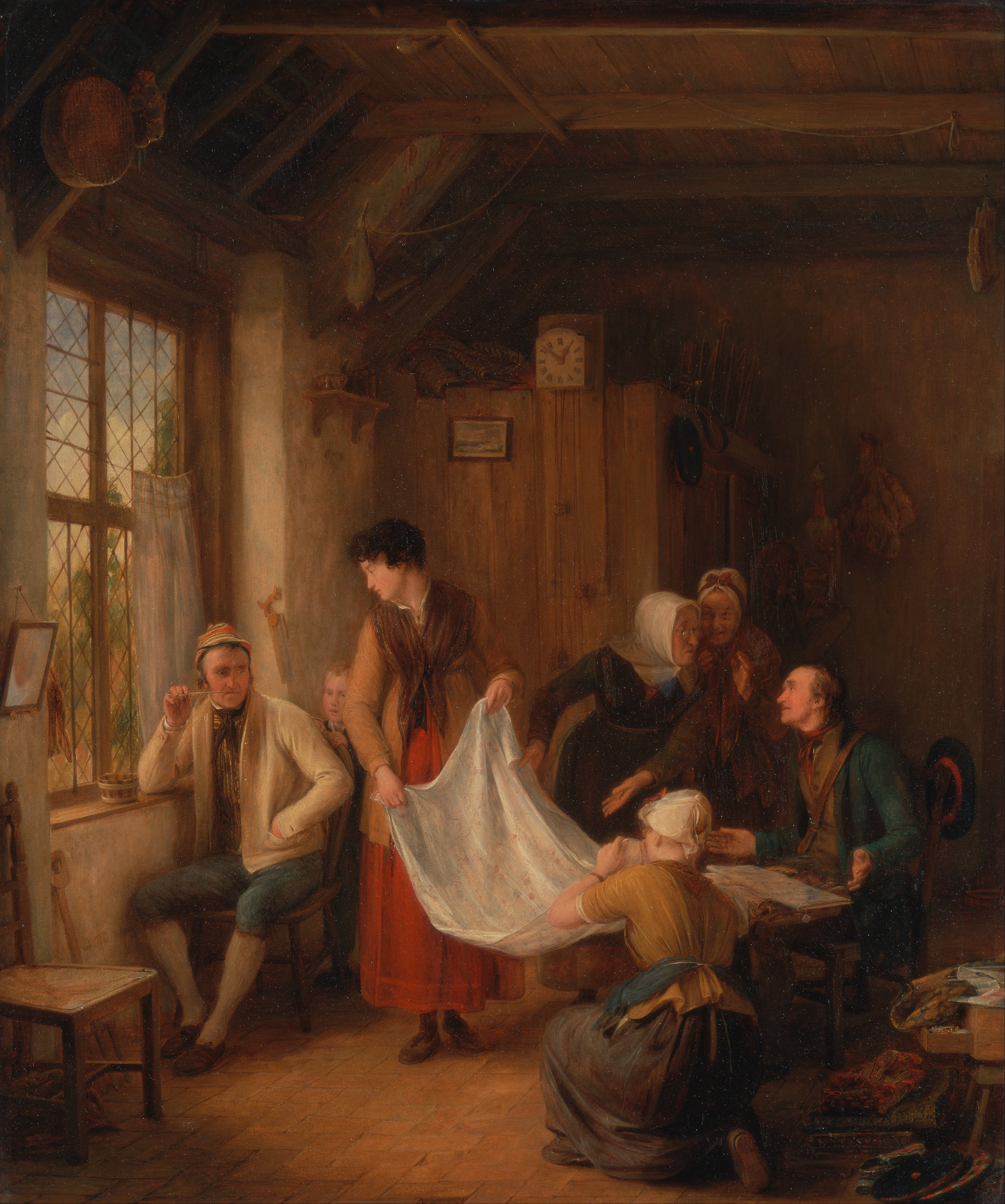
- Artist: David Wilkie
- Year: 1814
- Type: Oil on panel, genre painting
- Dimensions: 79.4 cm × 692 cm (31.3 in × 272 in)
- Location: Yale Center for British Art; New Haven, Connecticut

The Pedlar is an 1814 genre painting by the British artist David Wilkie. It depicts a Scottish pedlar calling at a cottage in England. The painting was commissioned by Wilkie's physician Matthew Baillie.

Wilkie's genre works, produced in the style of the seventeenth century Old Master David Teniers, enjoyed success during the Regency era. It was exhibited at the British Institution in 1817 along with Wilkie's landscape Sheepwashing. Today the painting is in the collection of the Yale Center for British Art in Connecticut.

== Bibliography ==
- Davidson, Hilary. Dress in the Age of Jane Austen: Regency Fashion. Yale University Press, 2019.
- Morrison, John. Painting the Nation: Identity and Nationalism in Scottish Painting, 1800-1920. Edinburgh University Press, 2003.
- Tromans, Nicholas. David Wilkie: The People's Painter. Edinburgh University Press, 2007.
