= Füssli =

Füssli is a Swiss-German surname. Notable people with the surname include:

- Henry Fuseli (1741–1825), Swiss-born British painter
- Johann Caspar Füssli (1706–1782), Swiss portrait painter
- Johann Kaspar Füssli (1743–1786), Swiss entomologist

== See also ==
- Orell Füssli, Swiss bookshop and publisher
