= The Letter of Introduction =

Painting by David Wilkie

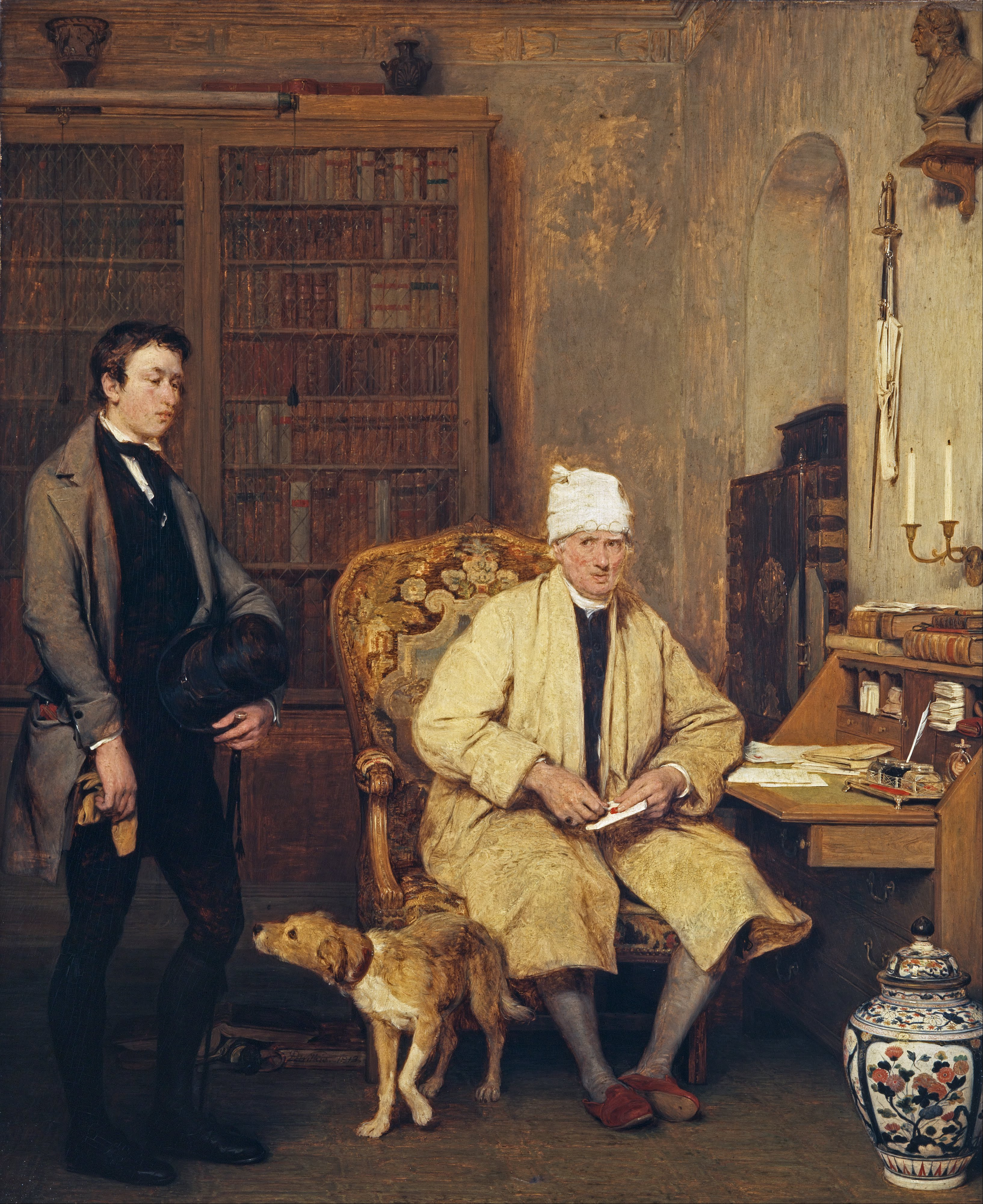
- Artist: David Wilkie
- Year: 1813
- Type: Oil on panel, genre painting
- Dimensions: 61 cm × 50.2 cm (24 in × 19.8 in)
- Location: Scottish National Gallery, Edinburgh

The Letter of Introduction is an 1813 genre painting by the British artist David Wilkie. It shows a young man in an awkward situation having called on a potential patron early in the morning with what turns out to be a worthless letter of introduction. The man, a gentlemen scholar, has an unwelcoming expression while his dog is noticeably hostile.

The painting was shown at the Royal Academy's Summer Exhibition of 1814 along with The Refusal. Today it is in the collection of the National Gallery of Scotland in Edinburgh, having been acquired in 1938.

== Bibliography ==
- Macmillan, Duncan. Scottish Art, 1460-2000. Mainstream Publishing, 2000.
- Tromans, Nicholas. David Wilkie: The People's Painter. Edinburgh University Press, 2007.
- Wright, Christopher, Gordon, Catherine May & Smith, Mary Peskett. British and Irish Paintings in Public Collections: An Index of British and Irish Oil Paintings by Artists Born Before 1870 in Public and Institutional Collections in the United Kingdom and Ireland.
