= John Sheepshanks (art collector) =

English clothing manufacturer and art collector (1787–1863)

- Born: 1787; Leeds, England, United Kingdom
- Died: 1863 (aged 75–76)
- Occupations: Clothing manufacturer Art collector
- Known for: Leaving his art collection to the Victoria & Albert Museum

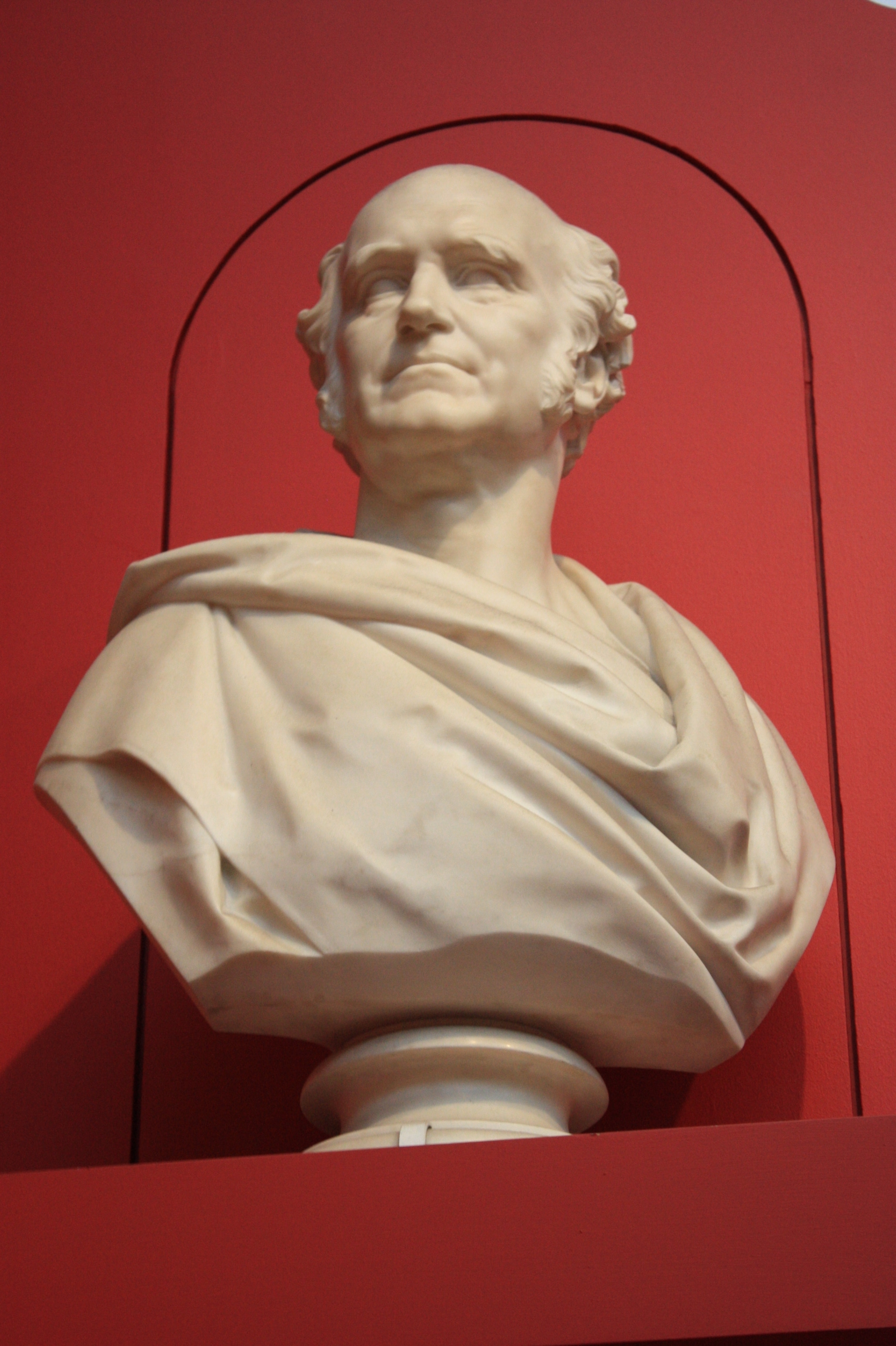
John Sheepshanks by John Henry Foley, 1866, Victoria & Albert Museum

John Sheepshanks (1787–1863) was a British manufacturer and art collector He was born in Leeds, and became a partner in his father's business as a cloth manufacturer.

== Art collector ==
Sheepshanks collected pictures, mainly by British artists, and in 1857 presented his notable collection to the nation. These are at the Victoria & Albert Museum, London, which no longer observes all the conditions which he attached to the gift. He retired from business in 1833 and died a bachelor in 1863. His sister and brother were Anne Sheepshanks and Richard Sheepshanks.
