= Richard Sheepshanks =

British astronomer (1794–1855)

Richard Sheepshanks (30 July 1794 – 4 August 1855) was a British astronomer.

== Personal life ==
Sheepshanks was born on 30 July 1794, in Leeds, the son of Joseph Sheepshanks, a Leeds textile manufacturer of the well-to-do Sheepshank family of Bilton, Harrogate. His brother was John Sheepshanks (clothing manufacturer and art collector), and his sister was Anne Sheepshanks (astronomical benefactor). He received his education at Trinity College, Cambridge, graduating in 1816. He was called to the bar in 1824 and took orders in Church of England in 1825, but did not practise either profession as the death of his father left him with sufficient wealth to pursue his scientific interests. He had six children from a relationship with an Irish dancer, one of whom was Eleanor Louisa Moravia Henry, also known as Nelly, mother of the painter Walter Sickert and the feminist Helena Swanwick. Sheepshanks gave financial support to the dancer and her husband, who in turn claimed paternity. In later life, he and his sister lived in Reading in Berkshire.

== Professional life ==
From 1817 until his death, Sheepshanks was a fellow of Trinity College, Cambridge, where he was an active astronomer. He served as editor of Monthly Notices of the Royal Astronomical Society and greatly improved their content. In 1830, he was elected a Fellow of the Royal Society. In 1832, he got involved in the lawsuit of Edward Troughton against Sir James South, in which Troughton demanded payment for an equatorial mounting that he had supplied to South, but which South claimed to be defective. Sheepshanks informally served as legal counsel to Troughton; South's legal counsel was Drinkwater Bethune. Troughton prevailed in the lawsuit. In 1833, he recommended withholding publication of an early edition of Stephen Groombridge's star catalogue, which was being published posthumously, after discovering the edition contained errors. A final corrected edition was later published in 1838 under the auspices of George Biddell Airy. In his later career he worked on establishing a standard of length for imperial measures. He was reportedly deeply sceptical of the work of Charles Babbage and of Babbage's ability to deliver a working Difference Engine or Analytical Engine. The two men publicly criticized each other.

== Death and legacy ==
He suffered a stroke ("apoplexy") on 29 July 1855, dying on 4 August, in Reading, and was buried at Trinity College. There is a memorial notice at St John's Church, Bilton in Harrogate. After his death, Richard's sister Anne Sheepshanks contributed a legacy towards research to be conducted by the Cambridge Observatory and a scholarship in her brother's name.

== See also ==
- Sheepshanks equatorial
