= Portrait of Lord Byron =

Painting by Thomas Phillips

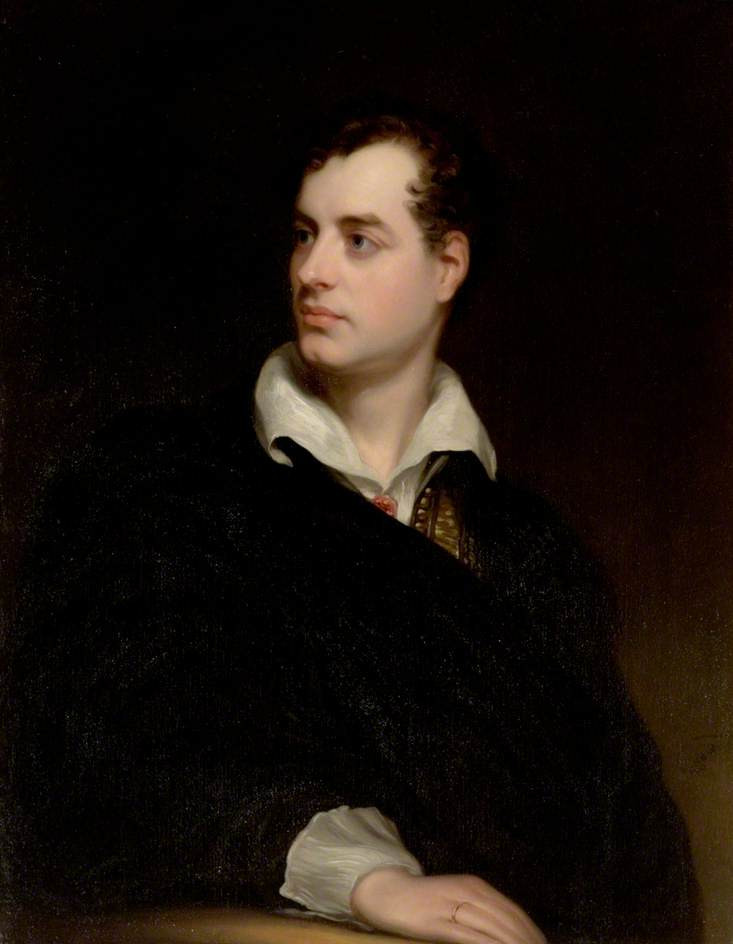
- Artist: Thomas Phillips
- Year: c. 1813–1814
- Type: Oil on canvas, portrait
- Dimensions: 91 cm × 71 cm (36 in × 28 in)
- Location: Newstead Abbey, Nottinghamshire

Portrait of Lord Byron is an oil on canvas portrait painting by the English painter Thomas Phillips, from c. 1813–1814. It depicts the famous British aristocrat and poet Lord Byron.

== History and description ==
Byron had become famous for his narrative poem Childe Harold's Pilgrimage, published in 1812 establishing him as a celebrity in Regency Britain. In 1816 he left Britain after controversy over his behaviour and spent the remainder of his life in Continental Europe. In 1824 he died of disease while taking part in the Greek War of Independence.

Phillips had produced an 1813 portrait Lord Byron in Albanian Dress at the urging of Byron's publisher John Murray. However, Byron preferred this painting, which was commissioned by his sister Augusta Leigh. It shows him in a romantic style, with his young and handsome features, while wearing a cloak wrapped around his shoulders. He sits in a dark background, dressed also in predominantly dark clothing and looks at his side right. The portrait was displayed at the Royal Academy's Summer Exhibition in 1814 alongside Phillips' also famous Albanian portrait.

Today it is in the collection of the Newstead Abbey in Nottinghamshire.

== Bibliography ==
- Bond, Geoffrey & Kenyon-Jones, Christine. Dangerous to Show: Byron and His Portraits. Unicorn Publishing Group, 2020.
- Casaliggi, Carmen & Fermanis, Porscha. Romanticism: A Literary and Cultural History. Routledge, 2016.
- Kenyon-Jones, Christine (ed.) Byron: The Image of the Poet. Associated University Presse, 2008.
- Shears Jonathon & Rawes, Alan. The Oxford Handbook of Lord Byron. Oxford University Press, 2024.
