= 1813 in art =

Events in the year 1813 in Art.

== Events ==
- May 3 – The Royal Academy Exhibition of 1813 opens at Somerset House in London
- June 21 – Battle of Vitoria: The Marquess of Wellington, as victor, reclaims 83 paintings seized by Joseph Bonaparte from the Spanish Royal Collection which he is allowed to retain.

== Awards ==
- Prix de Rome (for sculpture) – James Pradier

== Works ==
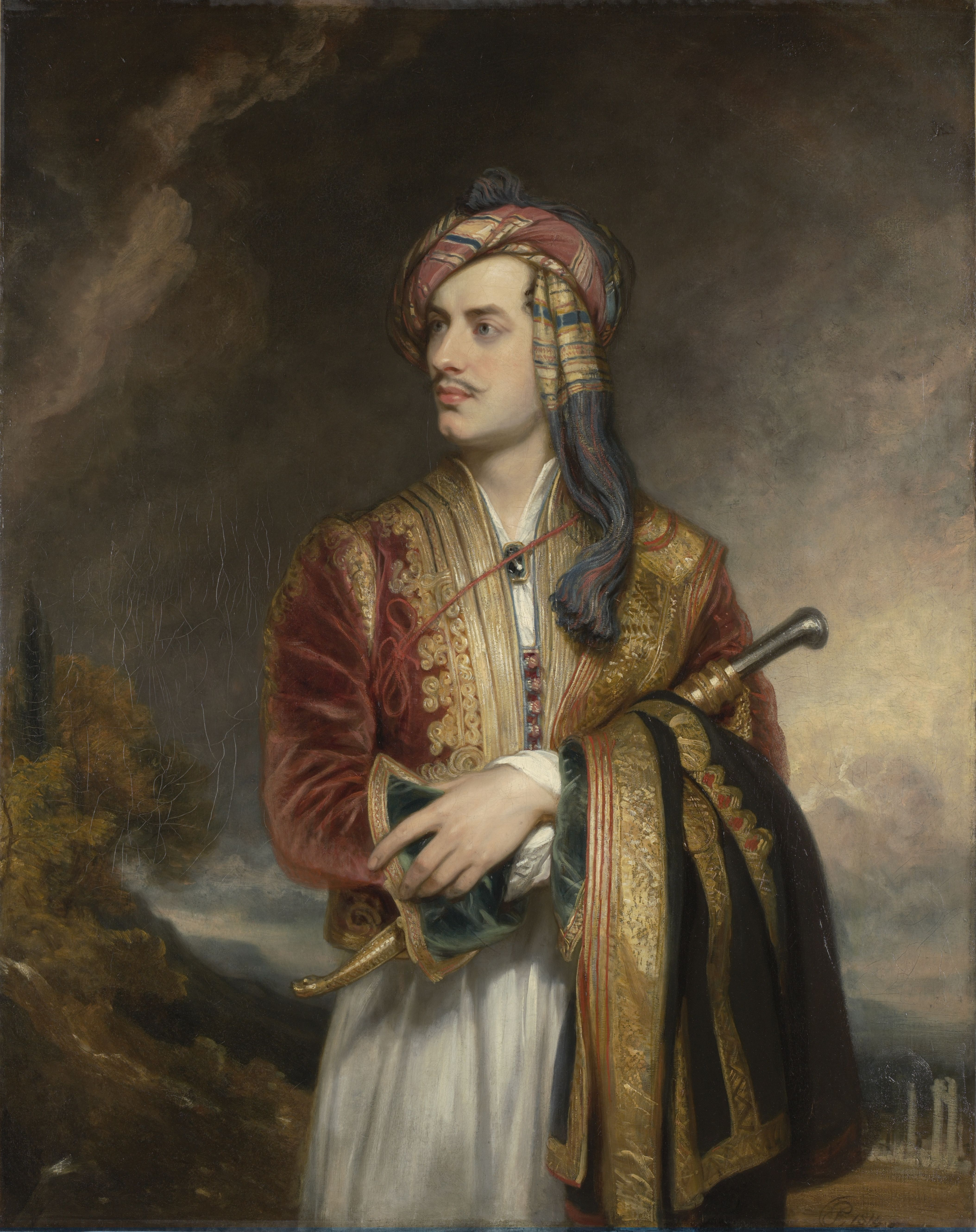
Lord Byron in Albanian Dress by Thomas Phillips

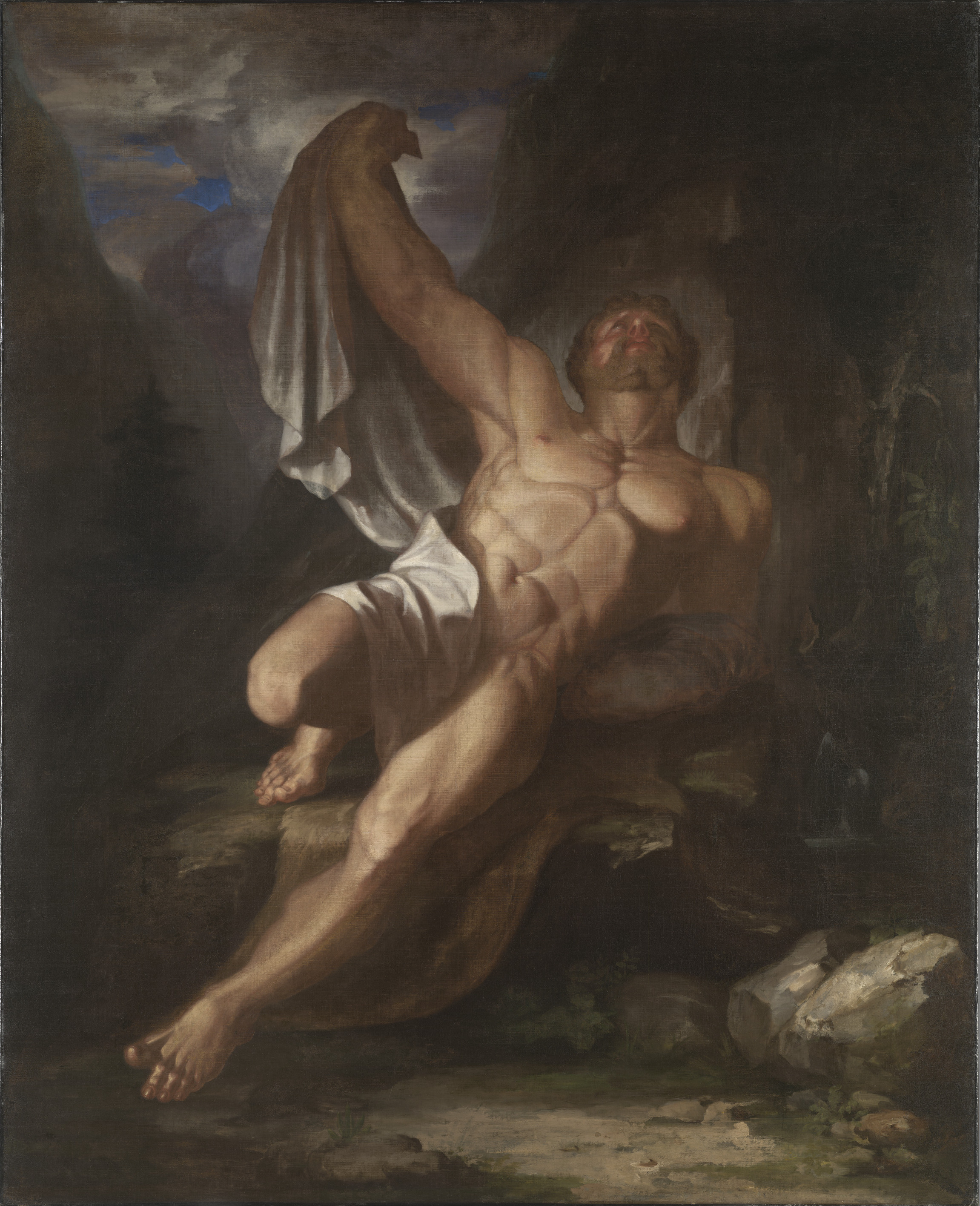
Samuel Morse – The Dying Hercules

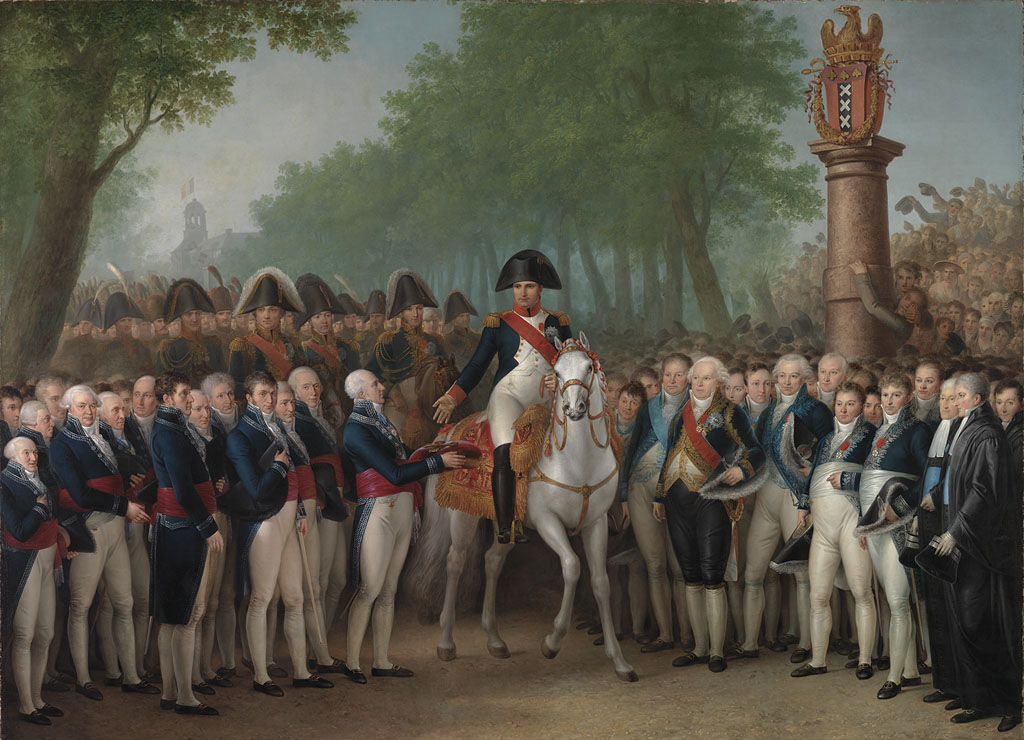
Napoleon's Arrival in Amsterdam by Mattheus Ignatius van Bree

- John Constable – Boys Fishing
- Johann Peter Krafft – The Departure of the Militiaman
- Francesco Hayez – Rinaldo and Armida
- Thomas Lawrence
  - Portrait of James Watt
  - Portrait of the Marquess Wellesley
- Samuel Morse – The Dying Hercules
- James Northcote – Portrait of Marc Isambard Brunel
- Johann Christian Reinhart – Blick auf Tivoli
- Thomas Phillips
  - Portrait of Lady Caroline Lamb
  - Lord Byron in Albanian Dress
- J. M. W. Turner – Frosty Morning
- Mattheus Ignatius van Bree – Napoleon's Arrival in Amsterdam
- Willem Bartel van der Kool – Piano Practice Interrupted
- Richard Westall – Portrait of Lord Byron
- David Wilkie
  - The Letter of Introduction

== Births ==
- January 2 – Eliseo Sala, Italian painter (died 1879)
- March 4 – Wijnand Nuijen, Dutch land- and seascape painter (died 1839)
- March 27 – Nathaniel Currier, American illustrator (died 1888)
- April 2 – Thomas Frank Heaphy, English miniature painter (died 1873)
- April 18 – Franz Ittenbach, German religious painter (died 1879)
- July 28 – Mathilda Rotkirch, Finnish painter (died 1842)
- September 17 – John Jabez Edwin Mayall, English photographer (died 1901)
- date unknown
  - George Hollingsworth, American painter (died 1882)
  - Gaetano Milanesi, Italian art historian (died 1895)
  - Frederick Scott Archer, English sculptor and photographic pioneer (died 1857)
- probable date – O. G. Rejlander, Swedish-born photographer (died 1875)

== Deaths ==
- January 14 – William Marlow, English painter especially of marine scenes (born 1740)
- February 5 – William Berczy, Canadian pioneer and painter (born 1744)
- March 22 – Gabriel Gotthard Sweidel, Finnish church painter (born 1744)
- April 12 – Jean François Carteaux, French painter and army commander (born 1751)
- May 31 – Wincenty de Lesseur, Polish portrait painter (born 1745)
- June 19 – Johann Christoph Rincklake, German portrait painter (born 1764)
- June 20 – Joseph Chinard, French sculptor who worked in a Neoclassical style (born 1756)
- June 22 – Anton Graff, Swiss portrait painter (born 1736)
- July 29 – Valentine Green, English engraver (born 1739)
- November – Alessandro Longhi, Venetian portrait painter and printmaker in etching (born 1733)
- November 29 - Giambattista Bodoni, Italian typographer, type-designer, compositor, printer and publisher (born 1740)
- date unknown
  - Anthonie Andriessen, Dutch landscape painter (born 1746)
  - Edmund Garvey, Irish painter (born 1740)
  - Henry Walton, British painter and art dealer (born 1746)
