= Portrait of the Marquess Wellesley =

Painting by Thomas Lawrence

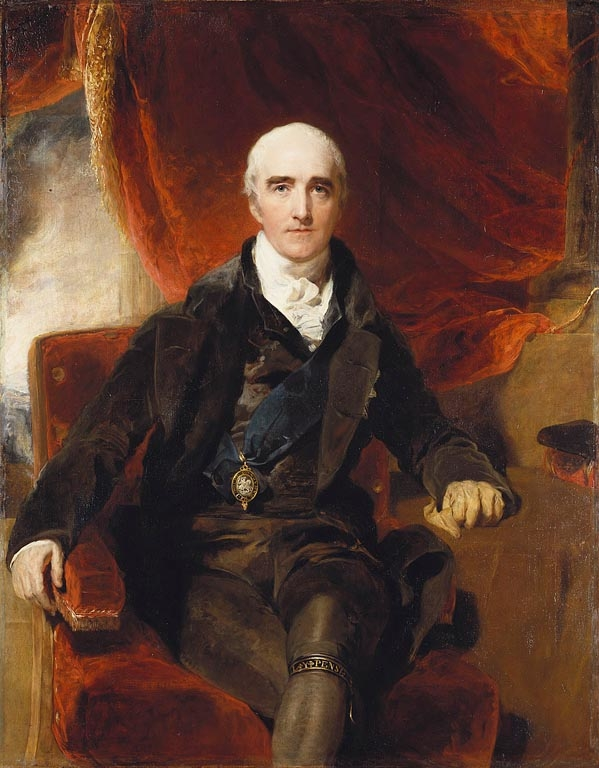
- Artist: Thomas Lawrence
- Year: 1812-1813
- Type: Oil on canvas
- Dimensions: 130 cm × 104 cm (52 in × 40.8 in)
- Location: Royal Collection, Windsor Castle

The Portrait of the Marquess of Wellesley is a portrait painting by the English artist Thomas Lawrence of the Irish statesman Richard Wellesley, 1st Marquess Wellesley. Wellesley was a senior politician in Britain where he served as Foreign Secretary from 1809 to 1812 and was regarded as a potential future Prime Minister. Lawrence was the leading portraitist of the Regency era, depicting prominent figures from Britain and its European Allies during the Napoleonic Wars. It is also known as the Portrait of Lord Wellesley.

== Subject ==
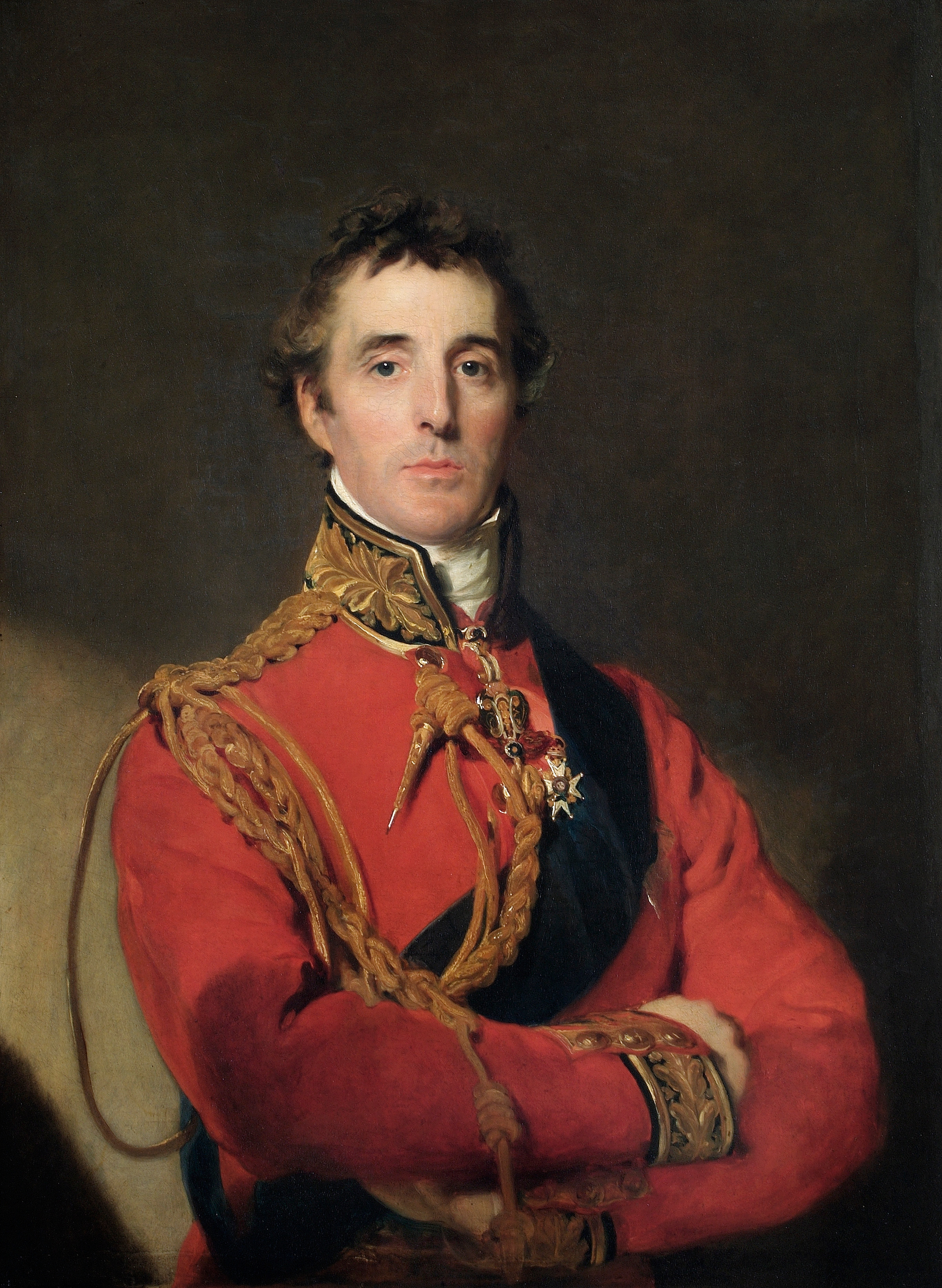
Portrait of the Duke of Wellington. Lawrence's 1815 painting of Wellesley's younger brother and protégé.

A member of the Irish Aristocracy, Wellesley had made his name during his spell as Governor-General of India. He had promoted the career of his younger brother Arthur, the future Duke of Wellington. By the time Lawrence painted him he was rapidly being eclipsed in fame by his younger brother who led British and Allied troops to victory in the Peninsular War and the later Battle of Waterloo.

Wellesley resigned from the government in early 1812 in a failed attempt to replace Spencer Perceval. His successor at the Foreign Office was Lord Castlereagh who oversaw British policy during the defeat of Napoleon. Wellesley remained on the political sidelines for several years, before his career revived by being made Viceroy of his native Ireland in 1821.

== Painting ==
The painting was commissioned by the sitter. He is shown dressed in an ensemble of black clothing and sitting on a red upholstered armchair with a curtain in the background. He is wearing the prestigious Order of the Garter (Lesser George of the Order of the Garter on the riband and the Garter on the left leg). As with all his major portraits, Laurence executed the work in oil on canvas. The painting was displayed at the Royal Academy's Summer Exhibition of 1813 at Somerset House. It became the best-known image of Wellesley, who was painted on several occasions, due to the numerous engravings made of it. An 1815 mezzotint by Charles Turner is now in the National Portrait Gallery. The original painting was later presented by Wellesley to the young Queen Victoria. In 1859 it was hanging at Windsor Castle. It remains part of the Royal Collection.

A few years after completing the painting, Lawrence depicted Wellesley's future wife the American heiress Marriane

== See also ==
- Portrait of Hyacinthe Gabrielle Roland, a 1791 portrait of Wellesley's first wife by Élisabeth Vigée Le Brun
- Portrait of Lord Castlereagh, an 1809 painting by Lawrence of Wellesley's successor as Foreign Secretary

== Bibliography ==
- Butler, Iris. The Eldest Brother: The Marquess Wellesley, The Duke of Wellington's Eldest Brother. ISBN 0340147466. Hodder and Stoughton, 1973.
- Hutton, William Holden. The Marquess Wellesley, K.G. ISBN 1103487043. Clarendon Press, 1893.
- Levey, Michael. Sir Thomas Lawrence. ISBN 0300109989. Yale University Press, 2005.
- Muir, Rory. Gentlemen of Uncertain Fortune. ISBN 0300249543. Yale University Press, 2019.
- Thompson, Neville. Earl Bathurst and British Empire. ISBN 1473804183. Pen and Sword, 1999.
- Wake, Jehanne. Sisters of Fortune: America's Caton Sisters at Home and Abroad. ISBN 1451607636. Simon and Schuster, 2012.
