= Blind fly =

Blind fly may refer to:

- One of several alternative names for the game of Blind man's bluff
- Common name for various species of blood-sucking flies in the family Tabanidae
