= The Deluge (painting) =

Painting by J. M. W. Turner

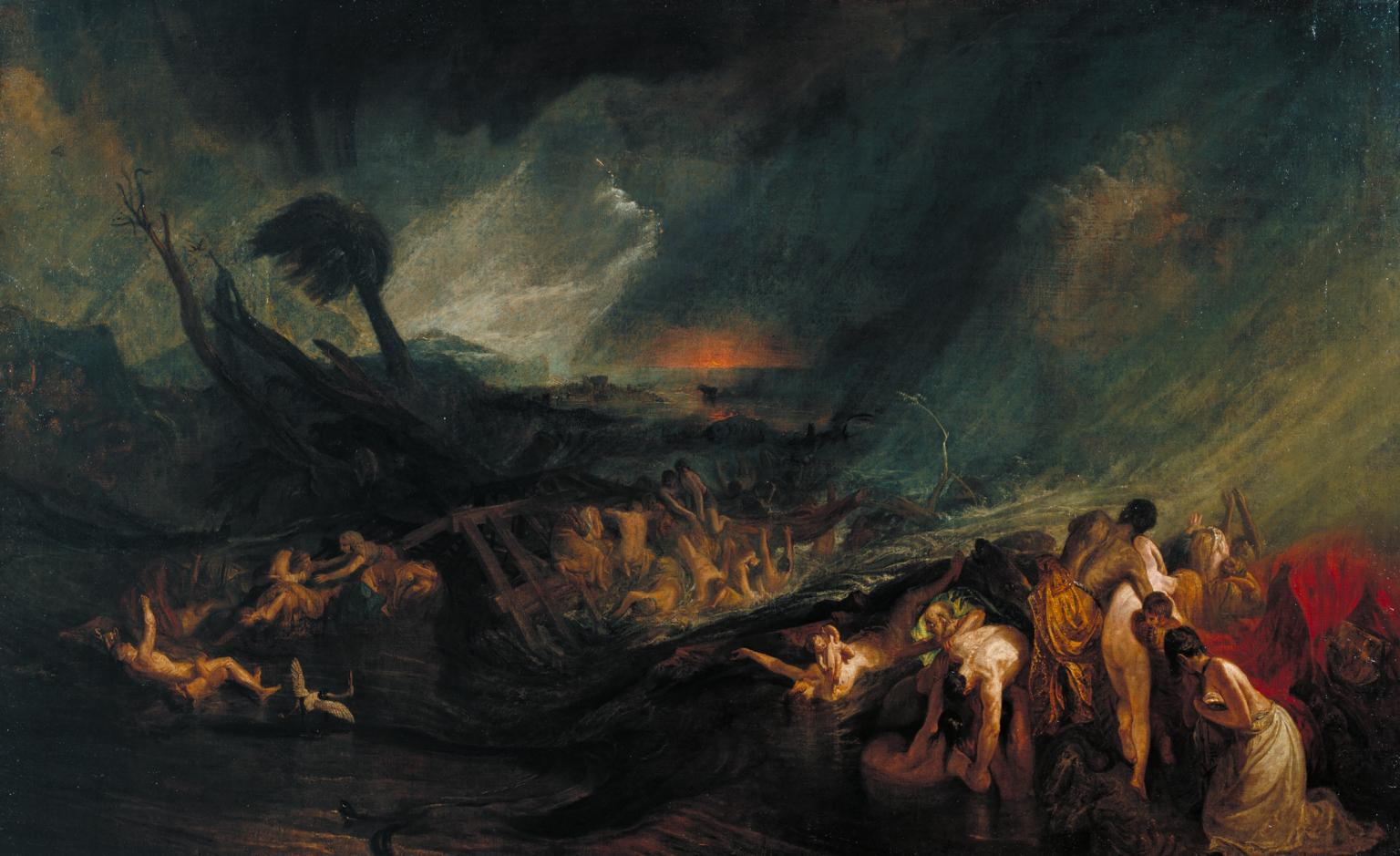
- Artist: J. M. W. Turner
- Year: 1805
- Type: Oil on canvas, landscape painting
- Dimensions: 235.6 cm × 142.9 cm (92.8 in × 56.3 in)
- Location: Tate Britain, London
- Website: www.tate.org.uk/...n00493

The Deluge is an oil on canvas biblical landscape painting by the British artist J. M. W. Turner, from 1805. It features a vision of the biblical flood focused on a shipwreck.

It was first planned in 1804 and was originally a commission that fell through. The painting was likely to have been first exhibited at Turner's studio in Queen Anne Street in London in 1805. It was later submitted to the Royal Academy's Summer Exhibition of 1813 at Somerset House. Part of the Turner Bequest of 1856, it is now in the collection of the Tate Britain, in Pimlico.

== See also ==
- List of paintings by J. M. W. Turner

== Bibliography ==
- Bailey, Anthony. J.M.W. Turner: Standing in the Sun. Tate Enterprises Ltd, 2013.
- Hamilton, James. Turner - A Life. Sceptre, 1998.
- Solkin, David. Turner and the Masters. Tate Britain, 2009.
