= Portrait of Francis Bourgeois =

Painting by William Beechey

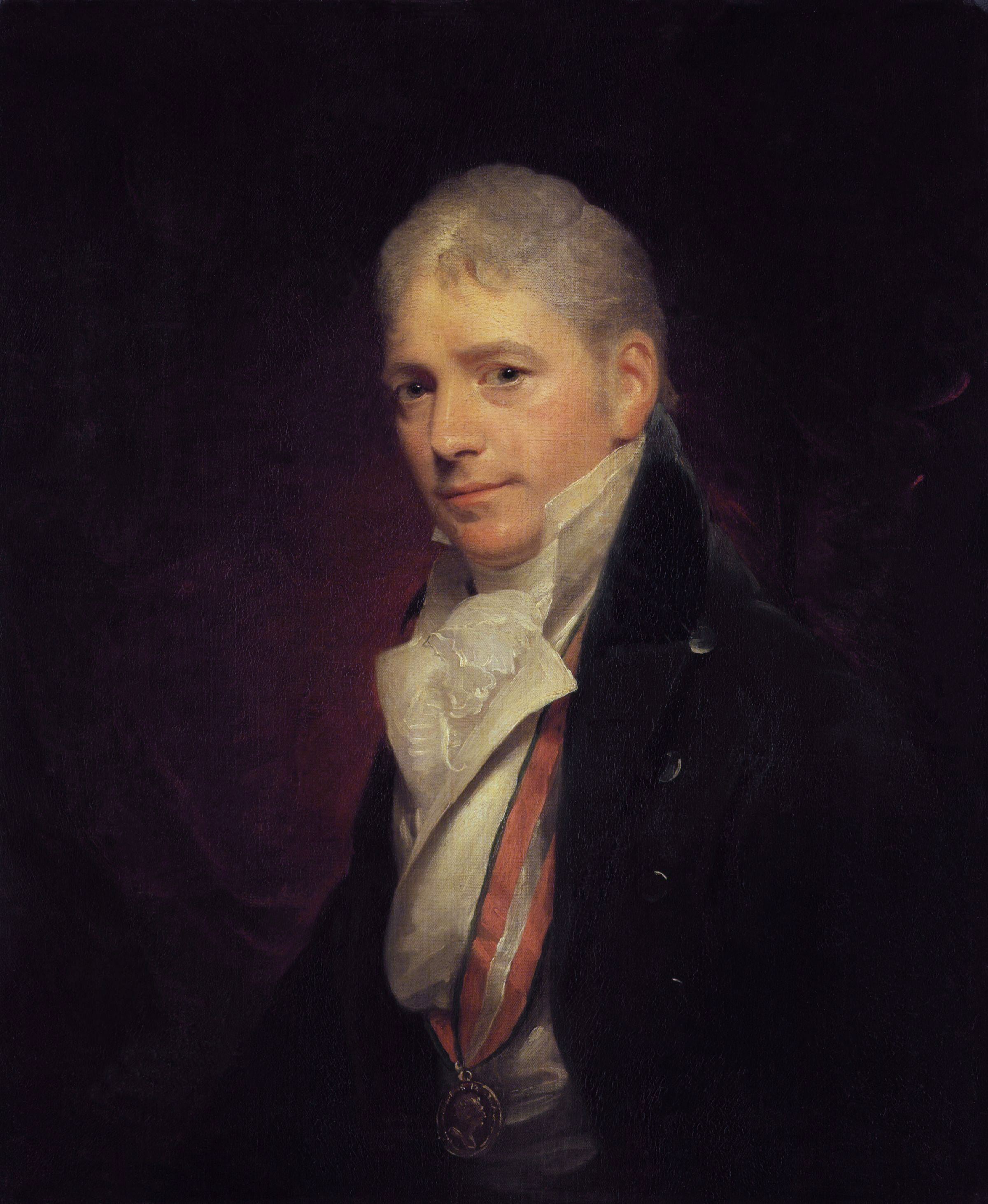
- Artist: William Beechey
- Year: 1810
- Type: Oil on canvas, portrait
- Dimensions: 76.2 cm × 63.5 cm (30.0 in × 25.0 in)
- Location: National Portrait Gallery, London

Portrait of Francis Bourgeois is an 1810 portrait painting by the British artist William Beechey. It depicts his fellow painter Francis Bourgeois, a member of the Royal Academy noted for his landscape paintings. Today Bourgeois is particularly associated with the Dulwich Picture Gallery in London. A noted art collector after his death in a horseriding accident, his will left his collection and his money to Dulwich College on condition it was used to found a gallery.

Beechey was one of the more noted portraitists of the Regency era along with Thomas Lawrence. He depicts Bourgeois wearing the Polish Order of Merit awarded to him by Stanislas II in 1791. Beechey displayed the portrait at the Royal Academy's Summer Exhibition of 1813 at Somerset House and again at the Society of British Artists in 1830. Three versions now exist with one at Dulwich, another at Sir John Soane's Museum and the third at the National Portrait Gallery, having been acquired in 1867.

== Bibliography ==
- Walker, Richard John Boileau. Regency Portraits, Volume 1. National Portrait Gallery, 1985.
- Wilton, Andrew. Turner in His Time. H.N. Abrams, 1987.
