= Boys Fishing =

Painting by John Constable

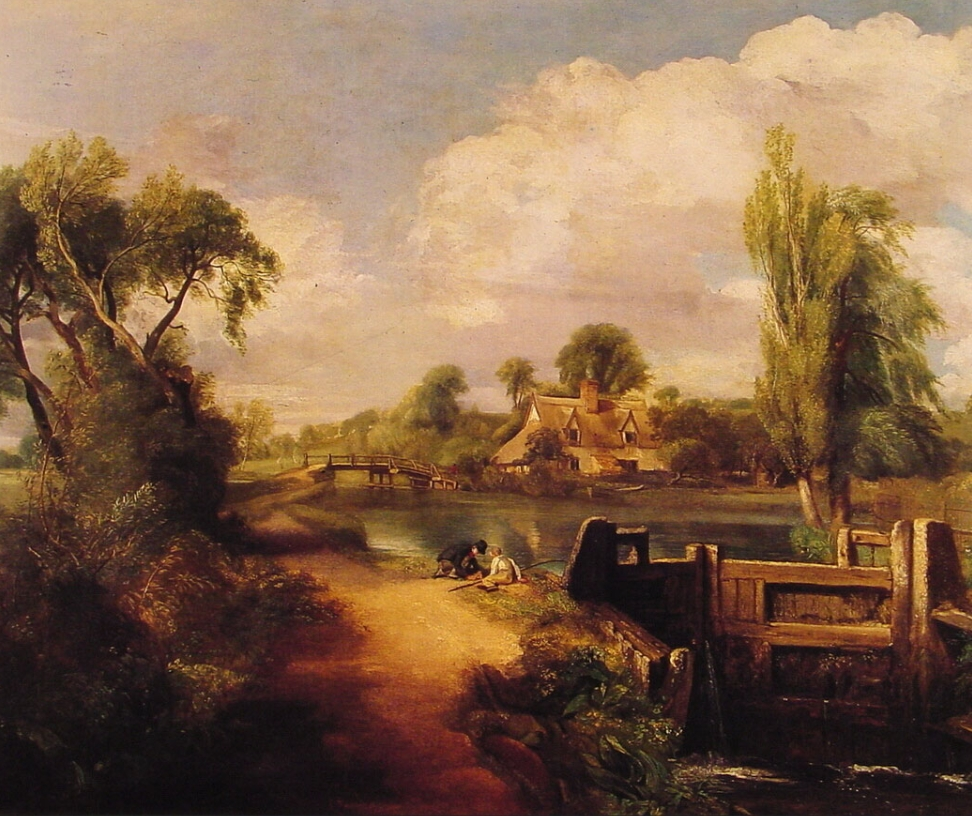
- Artist: John Constable
- Year: 1813
- Type: Oil on canvas, landscape painting
- Dimensions: 99.7 cm × 125.7 cm (39.3 in × 49.5 in)
- Location: Anglesey Abbey, Cambridgeshire

Boys Fishing is an 1813 landscape painting by the British artist John Constable. It depicts a view on the River Stour on the border of Suffolk and Essex which frequently featured in Constable's artworks. It shows the lock in Flatford near the mill owner by Constable's family. The painting takes its title from the inclusion of two boys fishing near the lock.

Constable displayed the work at the Royal Academy's Summer Exhibition of 1813 at Somerset House in London, one of three of his landscapes from him that year. It was the largest painting he had so far submitted to the Academy. Robert Hunt in The Examiner called it "silvery, sparkling, and true to the greyish-green colouring of our English summer landscapes" while Constable's friend John Fisher thought it the second best painting in the exhibition after Turner's Frosty Morning. Today the painting is at Anglesey Abbey in Cambridgeshire.

== See also ==
- List of paintings by John Constable

== Bibliography ==
- Bailey, Anthony. John Constable: A Kingdom of his Own. Random House, 2012.
- Gray, Anne & Gage, John. Constable: Impressions of Land, Sea and Sky. National Gallery of Australia, 2006.
- Eitner, Lorenz. 19th Century European Painting: David To Cezanne. Avalon Publishing, 2002.
- Hamilton, James. Constable: A Portrait. Hachette UK, 2022.
