= Portrait of the Duke of Wellington (Phillips) =

Painting by Thomas Phillips

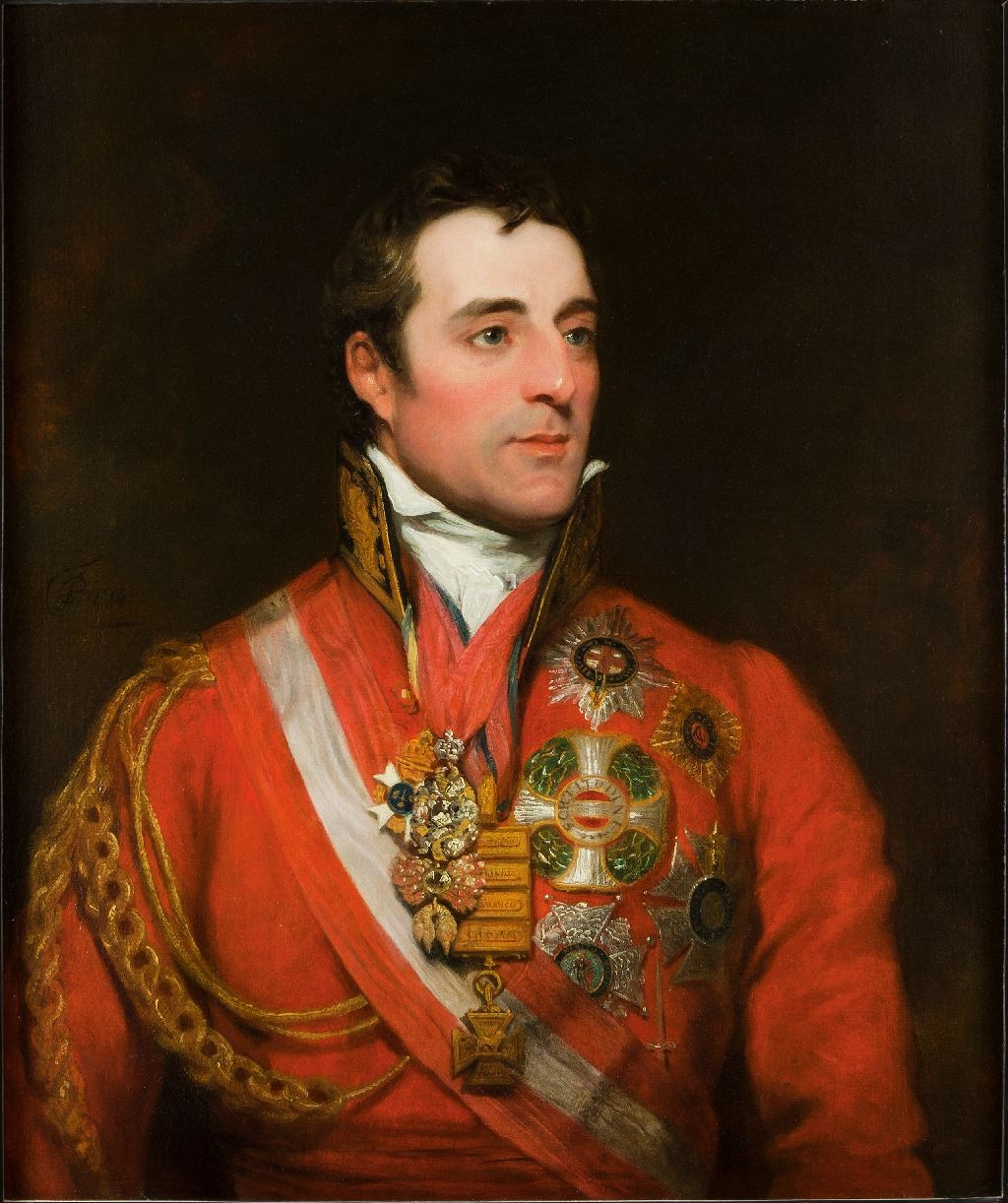
- Artist: Thomas Phillips
- Year: 1814
- Type: Oil on canvas, portrait painting
- Dimensions: 75 cm × 61.5 cm (30 in × 24.2 in)
- Location: Wellington Collection; Stratfield Saye

Portrait of the Duke of Wellington is an 1814 portrait painting by the English artist Thomas Phillips depicting the Anglo-Irish soldier and politician Arthur Wellesley, Duke of Wellington.

== History and description ==
Wellington had recently returned to London from Continental Europe where he had been serving without break since 1809. His success in the Peninsular War was followed by an invasion of Southern France before the Treaty of Paris brought peace. The following year he would lead Allied forces to victory at the Battle of Waterloo following the escape of Napoleon and the Hundred Days campaign.

Phillips was a leading portraitist and contemporary of Sir Thomas Lawrence, who painted a number of Regency era figures, including Lord Byron in Albanian Dress. The painting shows Wellington in the uniform of a Field Marshal of the British Army and wearing the Order of the Garter as well as the Spanish Order of the Golden Fleece amongst other decorations.

The work was produced for Lord Talbot, a cousin of the Prime Minister Lord Liverpool, and was later acquired from his descendants for the Wellington Collection. A mezzotint based on the portrait was produced in 1814 by William Say is now in the National Portrait Gallery.

== See also ==
- Portrait of the Duke of Wellington (Lawrence), another portrait painted a few months later by Thomas Lawrence

== Bibliography ==
- Levey, Michael. Sir Thomas Lawrence. Yale University Press, 2005.
- Muir, Rory. Wellington: Waterloo and the Fortunes of Peace 1814–1852. Yale University Press, 2013.
- Tromans, Nicholas. David Wilkie: The People's Painter. Edinburgh University Press, 2007.
- Wellesley, Charles. Wellington Portrayed. Unicorn Press, 2014.
