= Marco Polo (game) =

Game of tag played in a swimming pool

- Players: 2 or more
- Setup time: Minimal, less than 1 minute
- Playing time: No limit, dependent
- Chance: Low
- Skills: Swimming; sound localization; silence

Marco Polo (/ˈmɑːrkoʊ ˈpoʊloʊ/) is a form of tag played in a swimming pool.

== Rules ==
One player is chosen as "it". That player, with closed eyes, tries to find and tag any one of the other players, relying on hearing to find someone to tag. The player who is "it" shouts "Marco" and the other players must all respond by shouting "Polo", which the "it" player uses to try to find them. If a player is tagged, then that player becomes "it". If "it" suspects that a player has left the pool, they can shout, "fish out of water!" and the player who is out of the pool becomes the new "it".

== History ==
The game shares its name with the 13th-century Italian trader and explorer Marco Polo.

There does not appear to be any real connection between the game and the explorer of the same name. According to one whimsical explanation, "legend has it that the famed explorer didn't have a clue as to where he was going", this being reflected in the "it" player's behavior. Although water polo is another popular pool game, the name "Marco Polo" is unrelated.

The game is thematically similar to blind man's buff, an essentially identical game played on dry land that dates back to at least the 16th century. Marco Polo was known as a water game in America by the 1960s. Between 1965 and 1970, some respondents to a Dictionary of American Regional English survey, when asked to name a game played in the water, responded with "Marco Polo". By the mid-1970s, the game had spread and become very popular in swimming pools frequented by expatriates living in Hong Kong.

In modern times, Marco Polo is played worldwide. There are many regional variants of the game, with names such as mermaid on the rocks and alligator. The term "Marco Polo game" is sometimes used to describe an online game where a similar call-and-response system of gameplay is adopted.

== Analysis ==
Marco Polo is an "easily modifiable game", and is based on the notion of call-and-response. Marco Polo is a location-based game because players are confined to a set space and because players must locate each other using auditory clues. Encyclopedia of Play in Today's Society argues "there is bipolarity in the reversal of roles ... there are repeated actions, a routine to be repeated, rules to be observed, and verbal signs to be used". Playing this game can allow children to experiment with different social roles; they may learn what it means to be an outcast in the role of "it" (isolated, confined to a space, and unable to see others). According to the Nevada Regional Medical Center, "Marco Polo is not only fun; it can be a good workout. It also puts less stress on your bones and joints because the water makes your body float."
