= Portrait of Sir Charles Stewart =

1812 painting by Thomas Lawrence

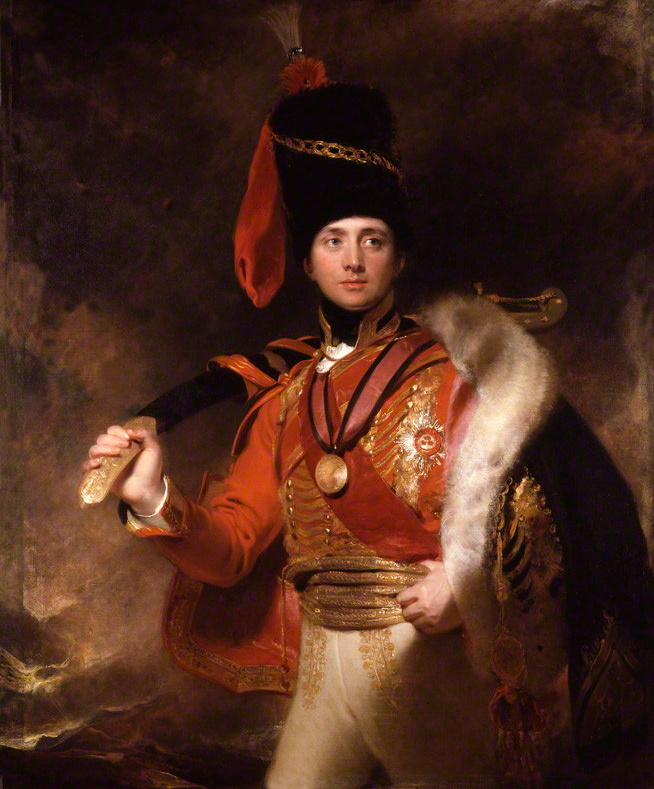
- Artist: Thomas Lawrence
- Year: 1812
- Type: Oil on canvas, portrait
- Dimensions: 143.5 cm × 118 cm (56.5 in × 46 in)
- Location: National Portrait Gallery, London

Portrait of Sir Charles Stewart is an 1812 oil-on-canvas portrait of the Anglo-Irish army officer and diplomat Charles Stewart by the English artist Thomas Lawrence. Stewart, a career soldier who had served in the Peninsular War as adjutant general to the Duke of Wellington, is show in uniform of a British hussar officer.

== History and description ==
Stewart had returned home from Portugal when he posed for the portrait and was subsequently appointed British Ambassador to Prussia, launching a diplomatic career that saw him play a key role in forming the alliance that defeated Napoleon and attending the Congress of Vienna. He is shown in hussar uniform, a branch of light cavalry that became prominent during the Napoleonic Wars. He wears his Peninsular Medal earned for his service over the past four years.

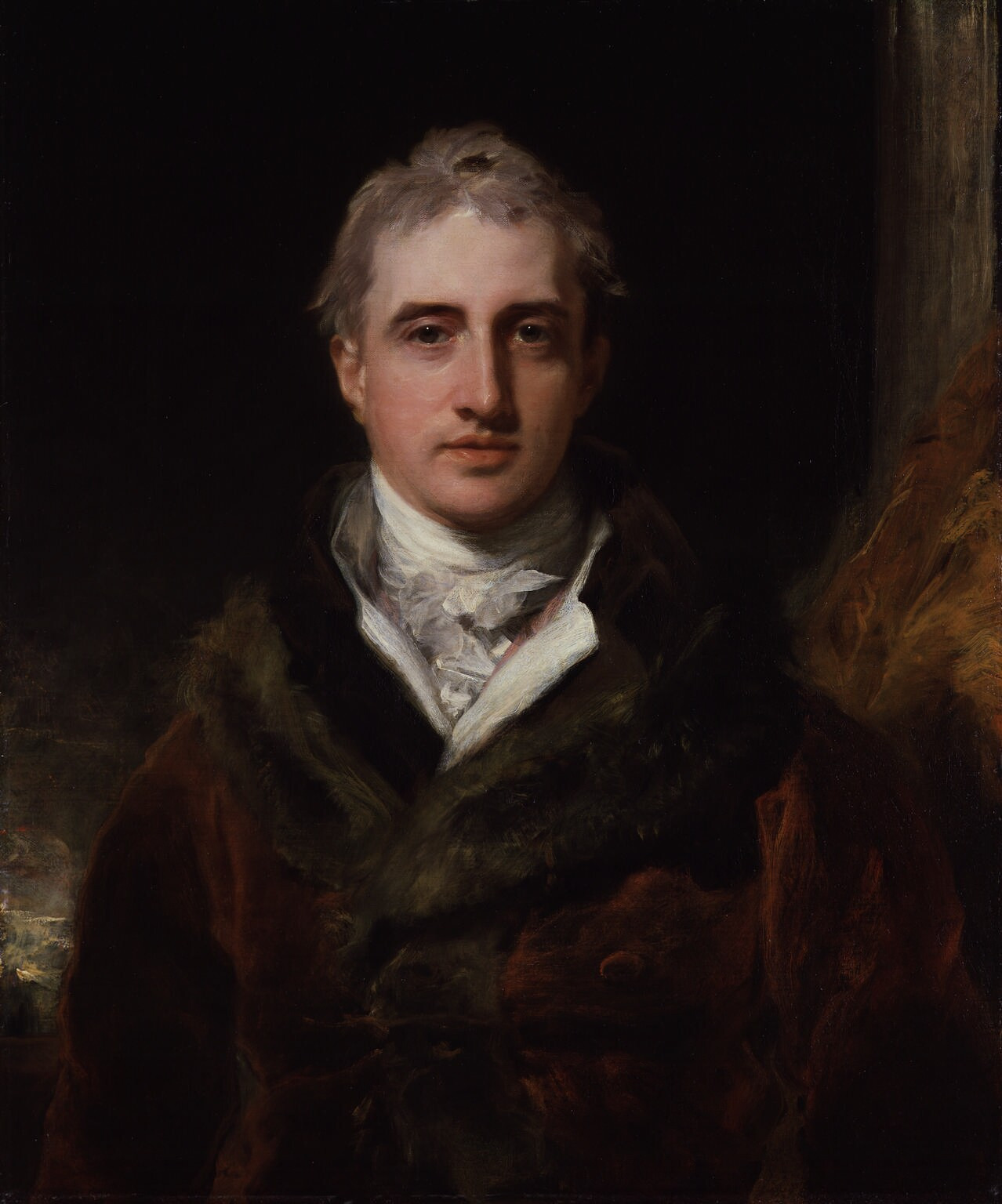
Portrait of Lord Castlereagh by Lawrence. Stewart's brother in 1809.

Stewart became a friend and patron of Lawrence, securing him commissions from the Prince Regent from 1814 onwards. As the younger brother of the British Foreign Secretary Lord Castlereagh he was well-placed to secure sittings for Lawrence with European leaders, in some cases attending in order to advance British diplomatic objectives. In 1822 Stewart became the Marquess of Londonderry in succession to his brother whom Lawrence had painted several times including his 1809 Portrait of Lord Castlereagh.

The work was displayed at the Royal Academy's Summer Exhibition of 1813. The painting is now in the National Portrait Gallery having been purchased in 1992 with assistance from the Art Fund. Another version of the work is in Apsley House, the Duke of Wellington's London residence.

== Bibliography ==
- Crow, Thomas. Restoration: The Fall of Napoleon in the Course of European Art, 1812-1820. Princeton University Press, 2023.
- Levey, Michael. Sir Thomas Lawrence. Yale University Press, 2005.
- Payne, Reider. War and Diplomacy in the Napoleonic Era: Sir Charles Stewart, Lord Castlereagh and the Balance of Power in Europe. Bloomsbury Academic, 2019.
