= Blind-Man's Buff (Wilkie) =

Painting by David Wilkie

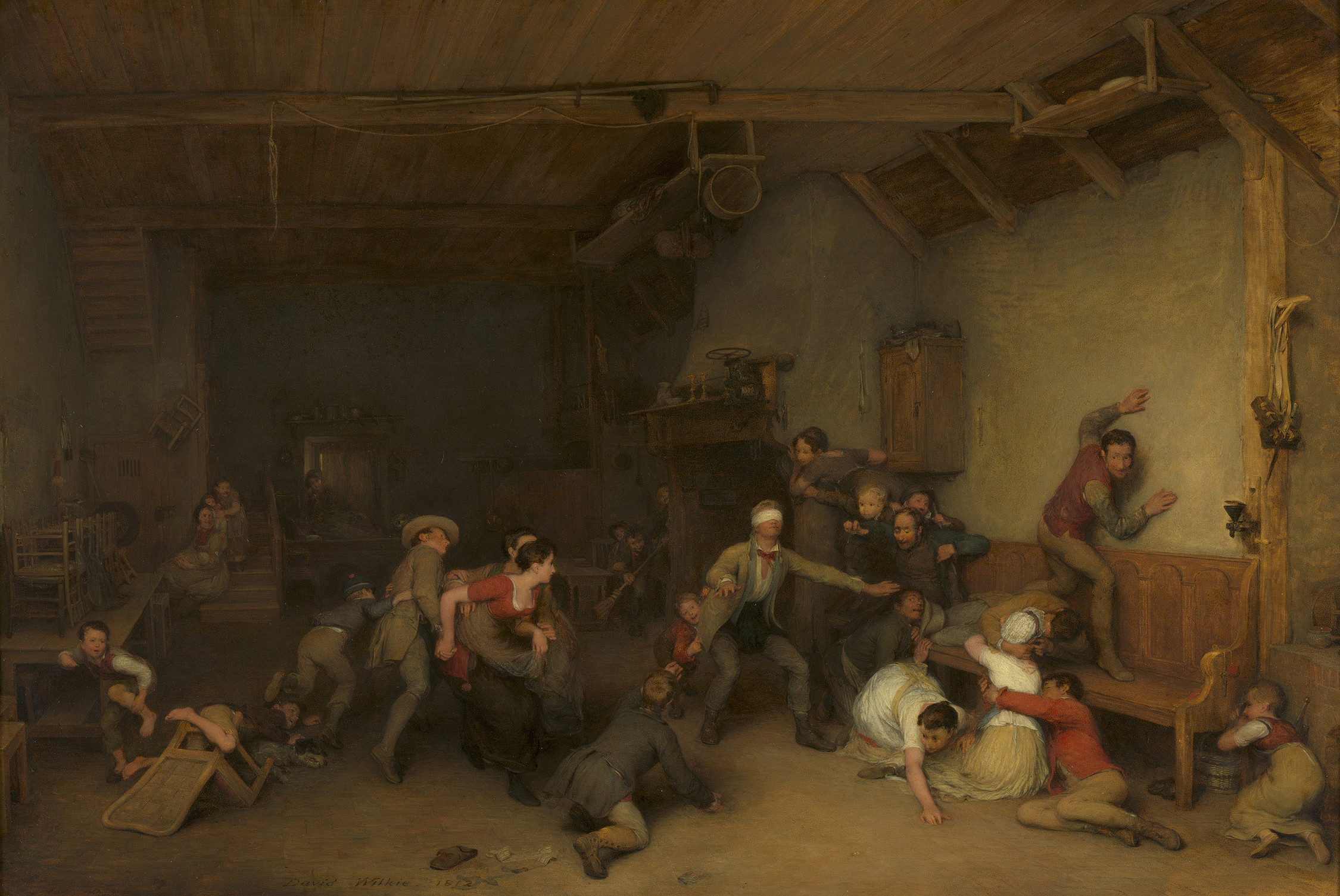
- Artist: David Wilkie
- Year: 1812
- Type: Oil on panel, genre painting
- Dimensions: 63.2 cm × 91.8 cm (24.9 in × 36.1 in)
- Location: Royal Collection

Blind-Man's Buff is an 1812 genre painting by the Scottish artist David Wilkie. It shows a game of Blind man's buff. While depictions of the game had appeared in art before, Willkie chose to portray a humbler settling than earlier versions generally set in drawing rooms.

== History ==
It was commissioned by George, Prince Regent who intended it to be a companion piece to a work already in his collection The Village Choristers (1810) by Edward Bird. He gave Wilkie a free hand to choose whatever subject he wanted. He exhibited it at a solo exhibition in 1812 and then at the Royal Academy's Summer Exhibition of 1813 at Somerset House, where it was "full as much liked as any I ever painted". It shows the influence of seventeenth century Old Masters on Wilkie's early genre paintings. It became even better known due to a popular engraving produced by Abraham Raimbach in 1822.

The Regent was pleased with the work, which cost him 500 guineas, and hung it in his London residence Carlton House. It was later recorded at the King's Lodge at Windsor. It remains in the Royal Collection. In 1818 George commissioned Willkie to produce a further companion piece The Penny Wedding.

== Bibliography ==
- Clarke, Deborah; Remington, Vanessa (2015). Scottish Artists 1750-1900: From Caledonia to the Continent. Royal Collection Trust. ISBN 978-1909-7412-01.
- Tromans, Nicholas (2007). David Wilkie: The People's Painter. Edinburgh University Press. ISBN 978-0748-6252-08.
