= Portrait of James Watt =

Painting by Thomas Lawrence

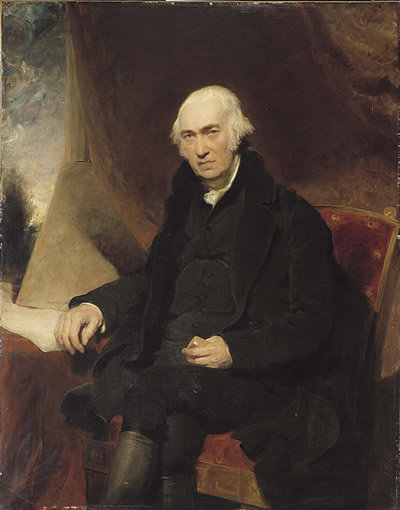
- Artist: Thomas Lawrence
- Year: 1813
- Type: Oil on canvas, portrait painting
- Dimensions: 142.3 cm × 111.9 cm (56.0 in × 44.1 in)
- Location: Aston Hall, Birmingham

Portrait of James Watt is an 1813 portrait painting by the British artist Thomas Lawrence. It depicts the Scottish engineer and inventor James Watt, a key figure of the Industrial Revolution known for his pioneering Watt steam engine.

Lawrence was a prominent portraitist of the Regency era, known for his Romantic style. The painting was displayed at the Royal Academy Exhibition of 1813 held at Somerset House in London. It is in the collection of the Birmingham Museums Trust having been acquired with the assistance of several groups including the Art Fund. It now hangs at Aston Hall in the city, which was the long-term residence of his son James Watt Junior. A mezzotint based on the painting was produced by Charles Turner and published in 1815.

== Bibliography ==
- Ellis, Andrew & Roe, Sonia. Oil Paintings in Public Ownership in Birmingham. Public Catalogue Foundation, 2008.
- Hills, Richard Leslie. James Watt: Triumph Through Adversity, 1785-1819. Landmark, 2002.
