= Blind man's buff =

Children's game

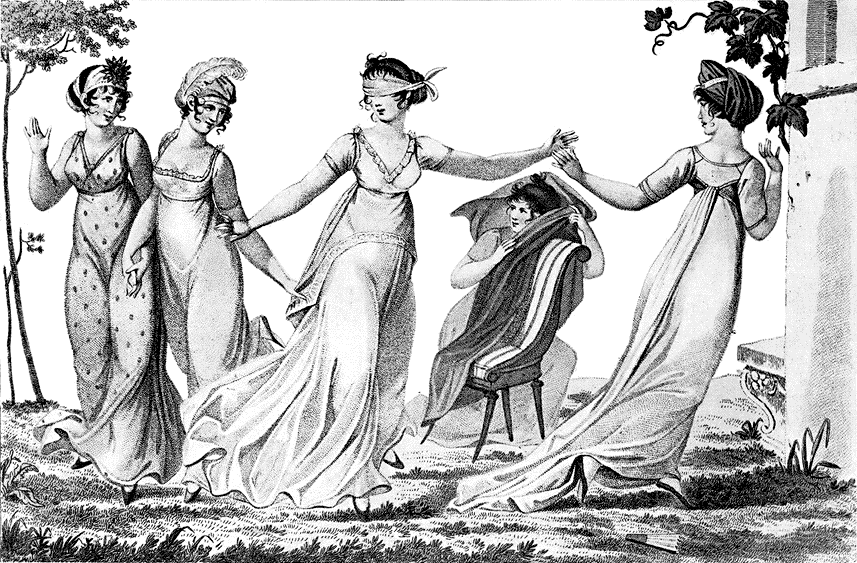
Women playing blind man's buff in 1803

Blind man's buff or blind man's bluff is a variant of tag in which the player who is "It" (i.e, the person who is tagging others) is blindfolded. The blindfold is typically made using a cloth, scarf or similar fabric, depending on local customs; in South Asian contexts, garments such as dupattas are commonly used as improvised blindfolds. The traditional name of the game is "blind man's buff", where the word buff is used in its older sense of a small push.

== Gameplay ==
Blind man's buff is played in a spacious area, such as outdoors or in a large room, in which one player, designated as "It", is blindfolded and feels around attempting to touch the other players without being able to see them, while the other players scatter and try to avoid the person who is "it", hiding in plain sight and sometimes teasing them to influence them to change direction.

When the "it" player catches someone, the caught player becomes "it" and the catcher flees from them.

== Versions ==
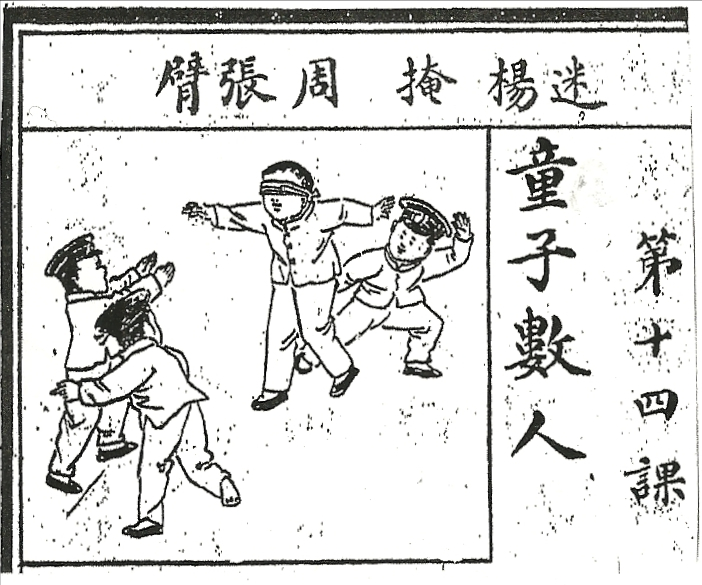
Facsimile of an illustration from the zhuomicang 捉迷藏 lesson in a 1912 Chinese elementary student's schoolbook

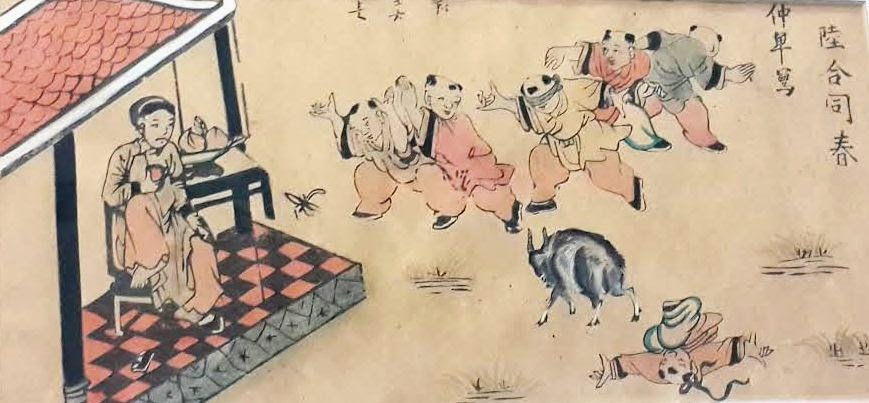
Blind man's buff (Bịt mắt bắt dê) in Vietnamese Hàng Trống painting

There are several versions of the game:

- In one version, the first player tagged by It then becomes It, and another round of the game is played. The Chinese version refers to the tagged It as lìng dài (令代, literally "to bid to take the place of").
- In another version, whenever any player is tagged by It, that player is out of the game. The game proceeds until all players are out of the game, at which point another round of the game starts, with either the first player or the last player to be tagged becoming the next It player.
- In yet another version, It feels the face of the person tagged and attempts to identify the person, and only if the person is correctly identified does the person become It.
- In a unique Japanese version, young girls dress up in their kimono and the blind-folded girl must catch or touch the other girls both while blindfolded and at the same time carrying a full cup of tea. This is portrayed in Shuntei Miyagawa's woodblock print Kodomo-no-Asobi (Children at Play), published in 1899 by Matsuki Heikichi of Tokyo.
- In an Irish version from County Louth, the game is played in a small dark bedroom, while the person who is It is still blindfolded to block out the remaining light. Reduced space and visibility for the rest of the players increases adrenaline. The person who is It cannot catch people by simply touching them but has to be certain that they have touched someone. People may disguise themselves as objects or hide.
- In a Persian/Iranian version of the game, children play in a small bedroom and attempt to distract or throw off the blindfolded seeker by pushing them with pillows/blankets or other soft toys. Those contacts made with the seeker do not count as being tagged so long as the body of the person is untouched.

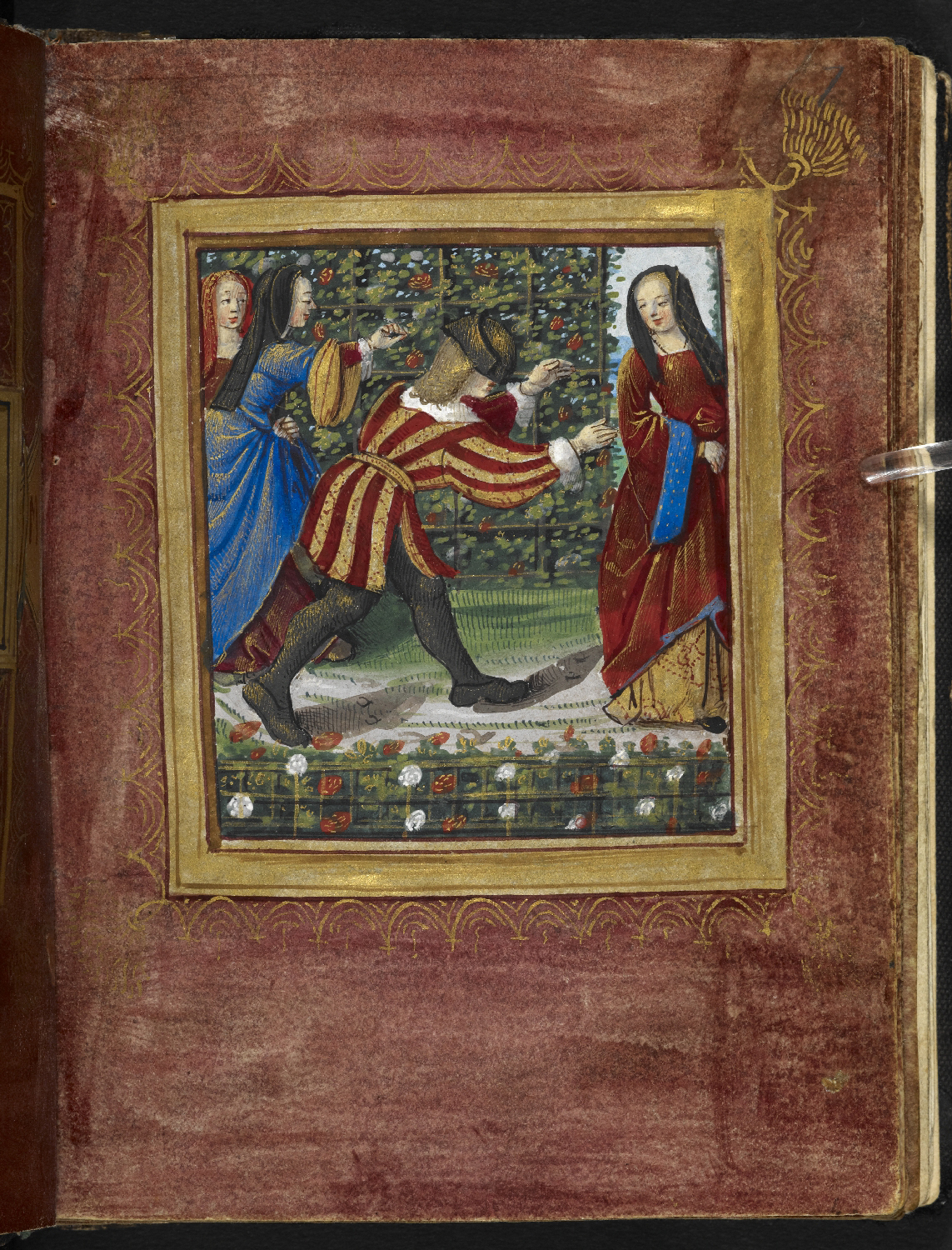
Petit Livre d'Amour, by Pierre Sala Partie

== History ==
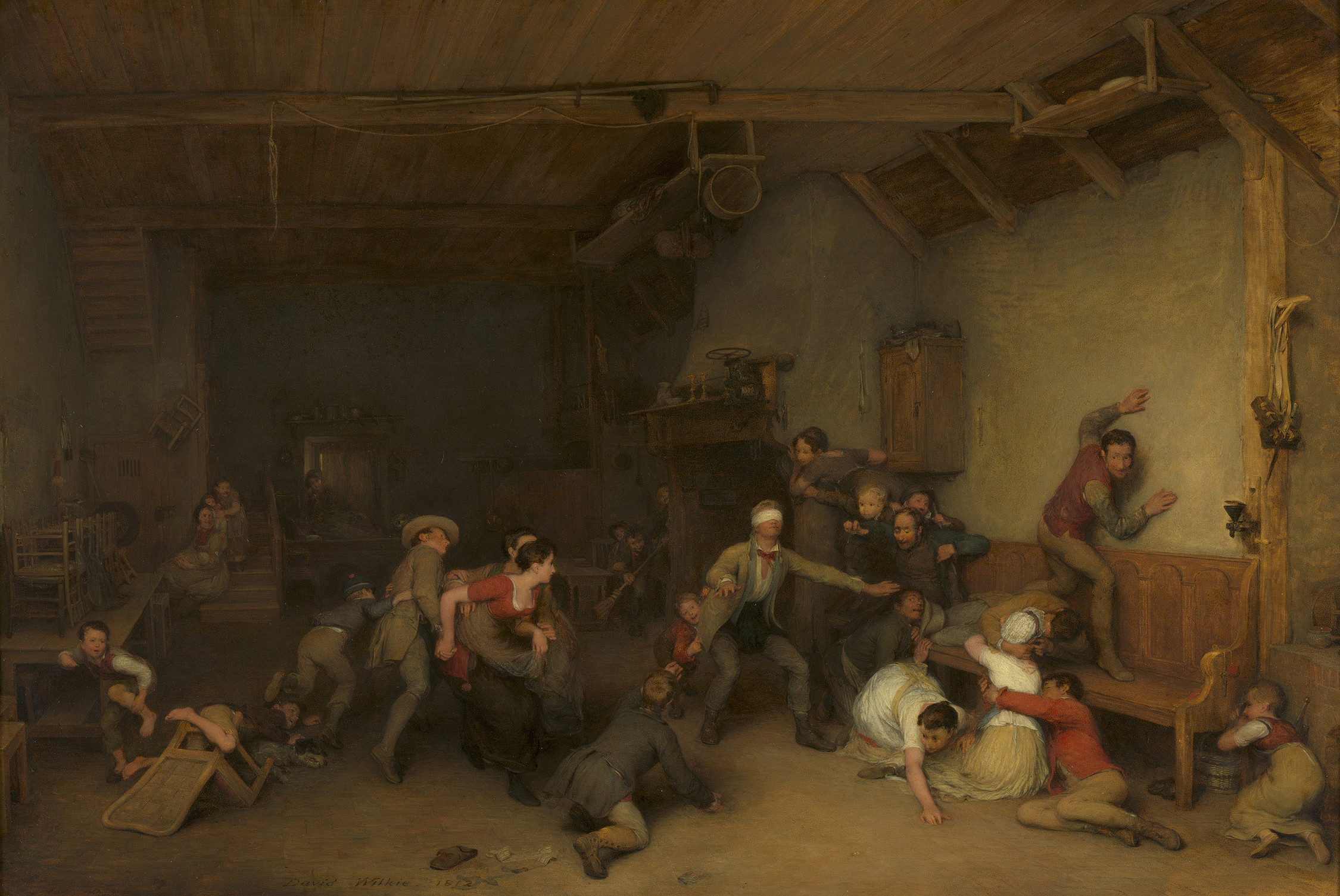
Blind-Man's Buff by David Wilkie, 1812

A Chinese version of the game, zhuomincang 捉迷藏, has been mentioned in literary works since the Tang Dynasty. The Emperor Xuanzong was said to have been blindfolded while trying to catch his concubine in a game of zhuomicang.

A version of the game was played in Ancient Greece where it was called "copper mosquito." The game was played in the Tudor period, as there are references to its recreation by Henry VIII's courtiers. It was also a popular parlor game in the Victorian era. The poet Robert Herrick mentions it, along with sundry related pastimes, in his 1624 poem "A New Yeares Gift Sent to Sir Simeon Steward":

That tells of Winters Tales and Mirth,
That Milk-Maids make about the hearth,
Of Christmas sports, the Wassell-boule,
That tost up, after Fox-i' th' hole:
Of Blind-man-buffe, and of the care
That young men have to shooe the Mare

It is also played in many areas in Asia including Afghanistan and all over Europe. The game is played by children in Bangladesh where it is known as Kanamachi meaning blind fly. One individual is blind-folded in order to catch or touch one of the others who run around repeating, "The blind flies are hovering fast! Catch whichever you can!"

== Similar games ==
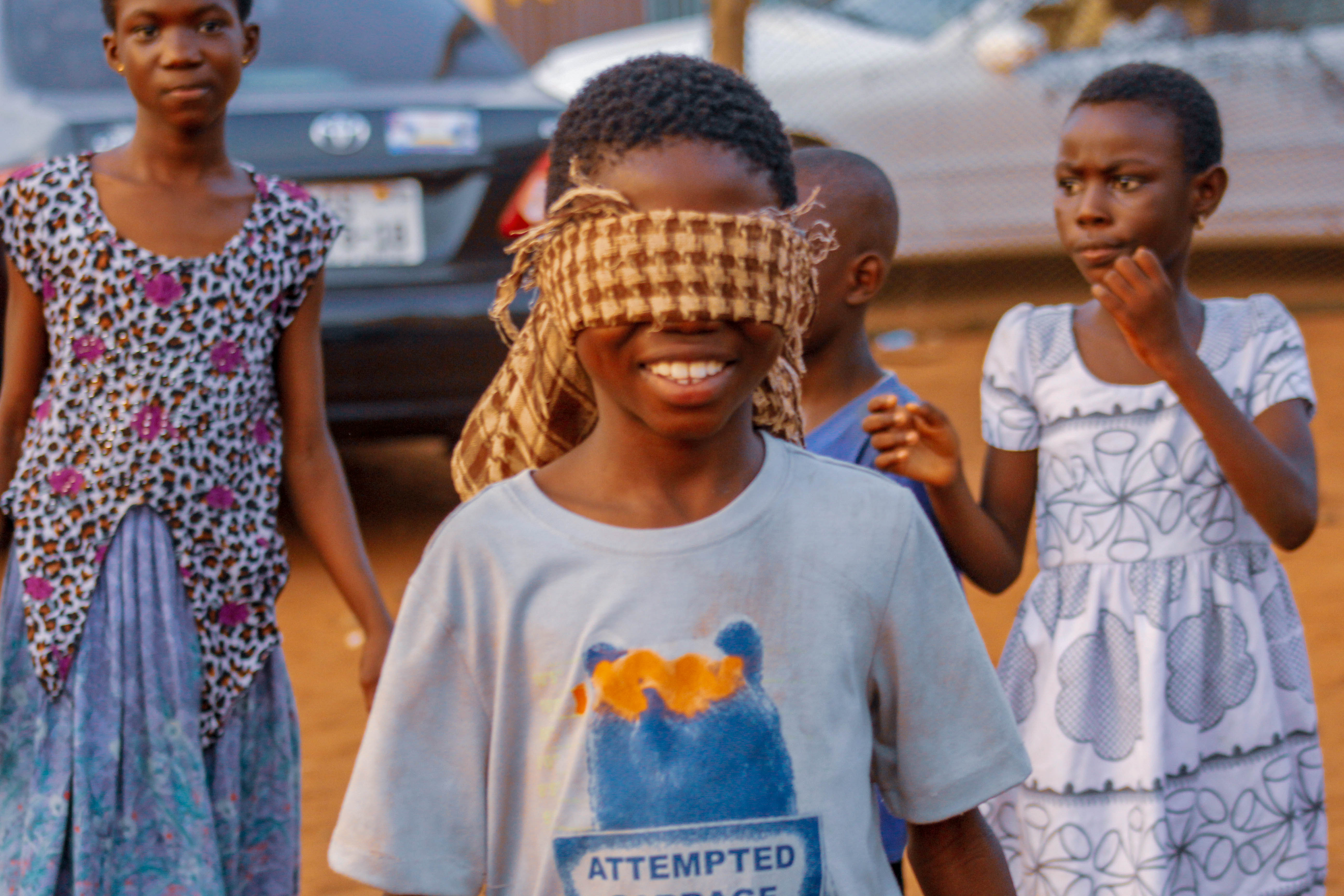
Children in Ghana

A children's game similar to blind man's buff is Marco Polo. Marco Polo is usually played in a swimming pool; the player who is "it" (the tagger) shuts their eyes and calls out "Marco" to which the other players must reply "Polo", thus indicating their positions and making it easier for "it" to go in the right direction.

Another children's game similar to blind man's buff is Dead Man. The player who is "it" closes their eyes rather than wearing a blindfold.

== See also ==
- I spy
- Hide-and-seek
- Marco Polo (game)
- Kagome Kagome
