= Portrait of the Duke of Wellington (Lawrence) =

Painting by Thomas Lawrence

- Portrait of the Duke of Wellington
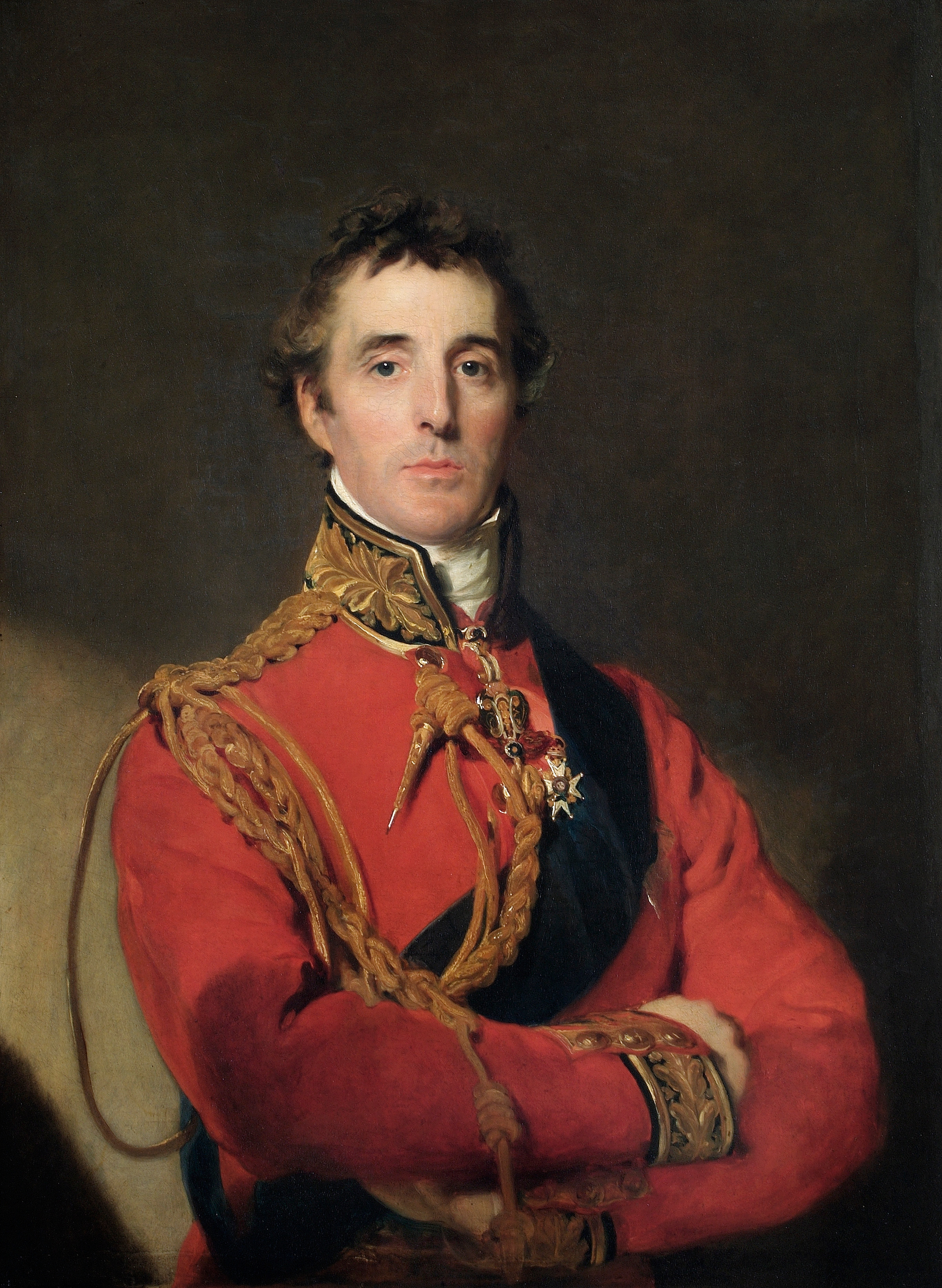
- Artist: Thomas Lawrence
- Year: c. 1815–1816
- Medium: Oil on canvas
- Subject: Duke of Wellington
- Dimensions: 91.5 cm (36.0 in) × 71 cm (28 in)
- Location: Apsley House, London
- Accession no.: WM.1567-1948
- Identifiers: Art UK artwork ID: arthur-wellesley-17691852-1st-duke-of-wellington-144237

Portrait of the Duke of Wellington is an oil on canvas portrait painting by the English artist Thomas Lawrence of the Anglo-Irish soldier and politician the Duke of Wellington. It was created c. 1815–1816.

== History and description ==
It was begun in early 1815 following Wellington's success in the Peninsular War and shortly before his victory over Napoleon at the Battle of Waterloo and the subsequent allied occupation of France under Wellington's command. It is now in the collection of Apsley House, the Duke's London residence. Wellington is shown in military uniform displaying various honours including the Order of the Garter, the Order of the Golden Fleece and the Order of the Bath. He has been described as "impassive and aloof" in the painting. Lawrence's depiction of Wellington was used on the British five pound note between 1971 and 1991.

Lawrence, Britain's premier portrait painter of the era, depicted Wellington a number of times. A further painting The Duke on Horseback was commissioned from Lawrence by the British Secretary of War, Lord Bathurst, featuring Wellington on his horse Copenhagen, completed in 1818.

== See also ==
- Portrait of Lord Castlereagh, 1809 portrait by Lawrence of Wellington's political ally Lord Castlereagh
- Portrait of the Duke of Wellington (Goya), 1812 portrait by Francisco Goya
- Portrait of the Duke of Wellington (Phillips), 1814 portrait by Thomas Phillips
- Portrait of the Duke of Wellington (Waterloo Chamber), an 1815 portrait by Lawrence in Windsor Castle
