= Portrait of Lord Castlereagh =

1809 painting by Thomas Lawrence

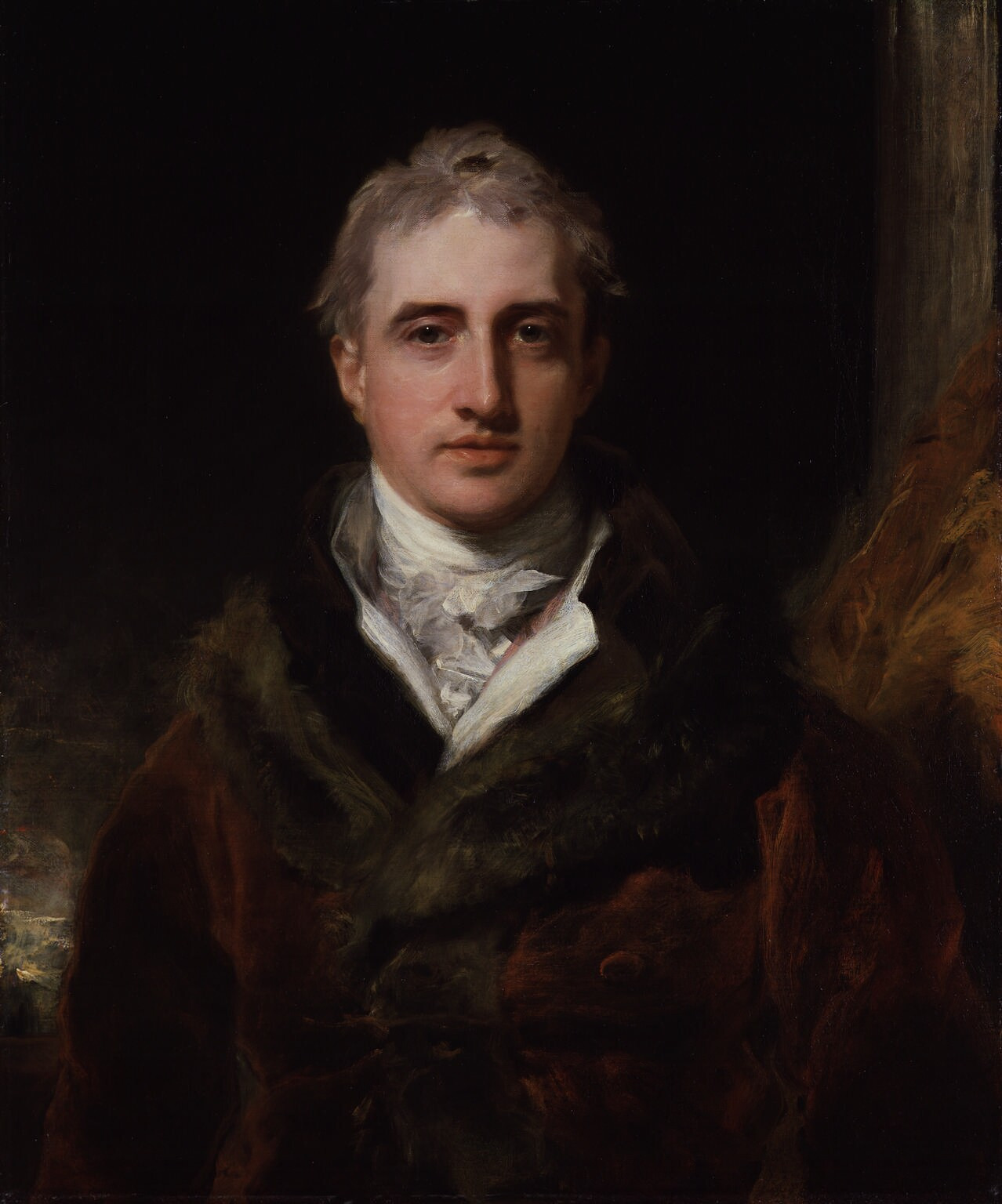
- Artist: Thomas Lawrence
- Year: 1809
- Type: Oil on canvas, portrait
- Dimensions: 74.3 cm × 61.6 cm (29.3 in × 24.3 in)
- Location: National Portrait Gallery, London

Portrait of Lord Castlereagh is an 1809 portrait by the English artist Thomas Lawrence of the Irish politician Lord Castlereagh, then serving as the British Secretary of War. Lawrence had developed a reputation as a leading artist of society portraits, and was on friendly terms with the politician.

The portrait was displayed at the Royal Academy's Summer Exhibition of 1810 at Somerset House along with three other Lawrence works. Despite receiving praise from many quarters, Castlereagh's painting received a damning critique by Peter Finnerty, an opponent of the Irishman, in the Morning Chronicle.

The same year that the work was painted, Castlereagh oversaw the failed Walcheren Expedition during the Napoleonic Wars. In the wake of this, he resigned and fought a duel with his cabinet colleague George Canning. After three years out of government, he returned as Foreign Secretary in 1812 and served for a decade, participating in the defeat of Napoleon and the creation of the post-war Congress System. Another painting of him by Lawrence was exhibited at the Royal Academy in 1814.

Today the painting is on display in the National Portrait Gallery in London, having been purchased for the collection in 1892.

== See also ==
- Portrait of Sir Charles Stewart, an 1812 painting by Lawrence of Castlereagh's brother
- Portrait of the Duke of Wellington, 1815 portrait of his ally and friend the Duke of Wellington
- Portrait of George Canning, 1826 portrait of George Canning with whom he fought the 1809 duel

== Bibliography ==
- Davey, James. In Nelson's Wake: The Navy and the Napoleonic Wars. Yale University Press, 2016.
- Hunt, Giles. The Duel: Castlereagh, Canning and Deadly Cabinet Rivalry. Bloomsbury Academic, 2008.
- Levey, Michael. Sir Thomas Lawrence. Yale University Press, 2005.
- Timbs, John. Anecdote Biography. William Hogarth, Sir Joshua Reynolds, Thomas Gainsborough, Henry Fuseli, Sir Thomas Lawrence, and J. M. W. Turner. Richard Bentley, 1860.
