= Royal Academy Exhibition of 1813 =

1813 art exhibition in London

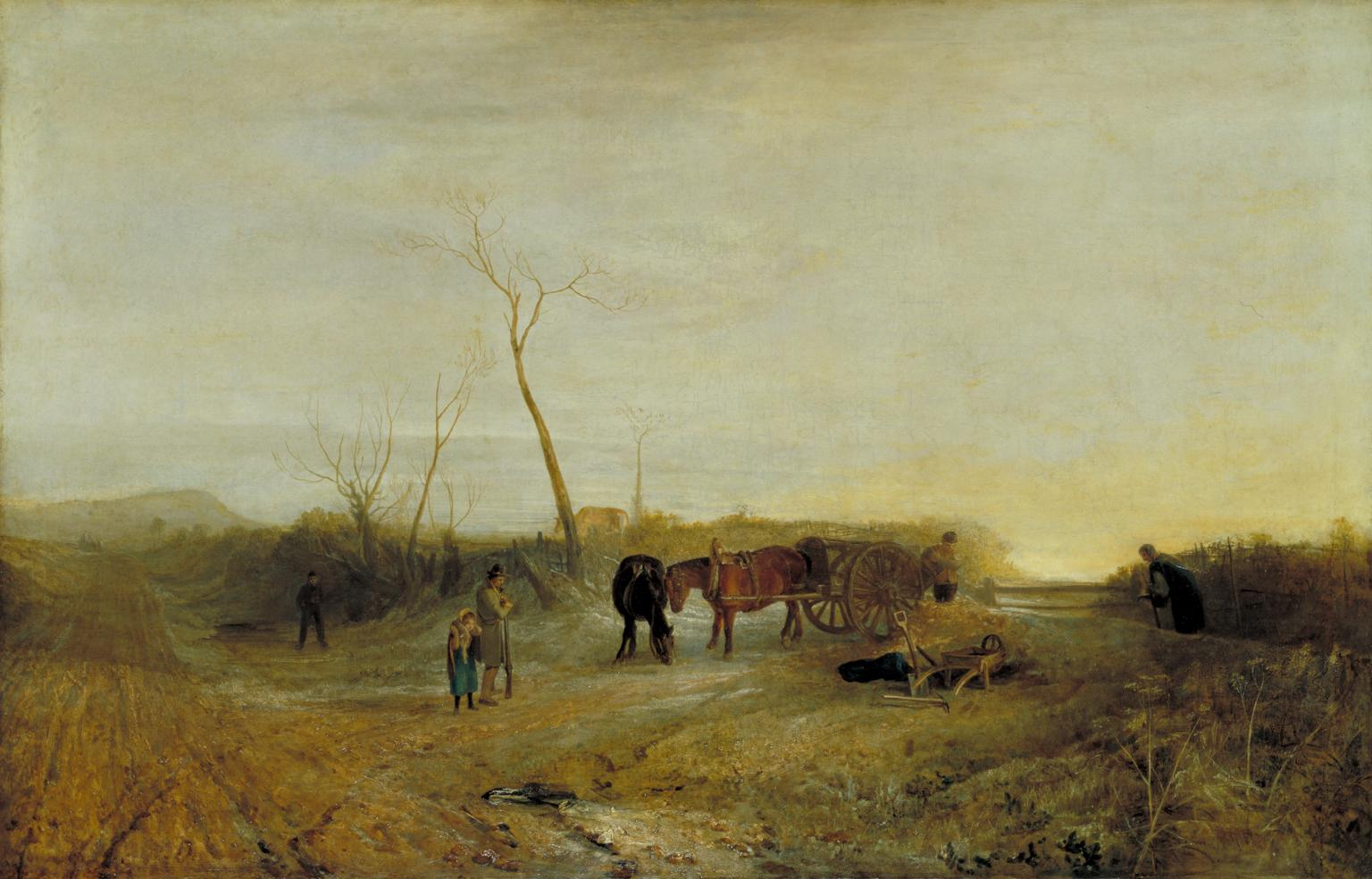
Frosty Morning by J.M.W. Turner

The Royal Academy Exhibition of 1813 was the annual Summer Exhibition or the British Royal Academy of Arts. It was held at Somerset House in London between 3 May and 26 June 1813 and featured many of the leading painters, sculptors and architects of the Regency era. Over seventy two thousand visitors attended the Exhibition.

It was held at a time when the Peninsular War turned sharply in favour of Britain and its Allies. The leading portraitist of the period Thomas Lawrence featured prominent military figures Thomas Graham and his Portrait of Sir Charles Stewart alongside the Portrait of the Marquess Wellesley depicting the Anglo-Irish politician and elder brother of Lord Wellington. Both William Beechey and George Francis Joseph submitted portraits of former Prime Minister Spencer Perceval who had been assassinated the previous year.

J.M.W. Turner sent in two paintings, one Frosty Morning, was inspired by a coach journey he had taken through Northern England. The other The Deluge was a biblical landscape painting. One of the most acclaimed works was the Scottish artist David Wilkie's Blind-Man's Buff, a genre piece commissioned by the Prince Regent. Wilkie was able to secure a good position for the work as he served on the hanging committee. Edward Bird, a key figure in the Bristol School of artists, displayed a series of paintings depicting the activities and arrest of a poacher. The American Samuel Morse displayed the large Dying Hercules which received critical praise. The exhibition coincided with a popular respective of the paintings of Joshua Reynolds British Institution which drew some attention away from it. The Royal Academy Exhibition of 1814 the following year was the first to be held following the abdication of Napoleon.

== Gallery ==
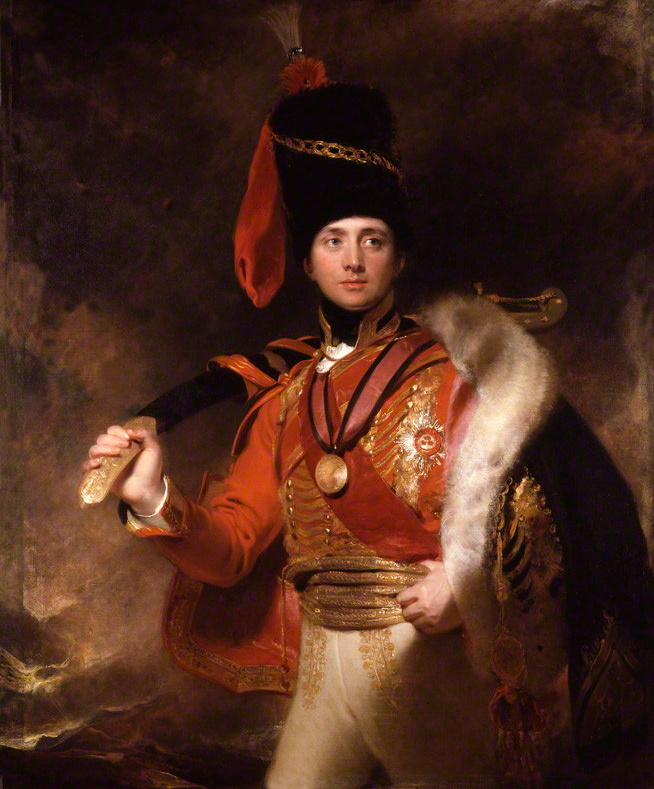
Portrait of Sir Charles Stewart by Thomas Lawrence

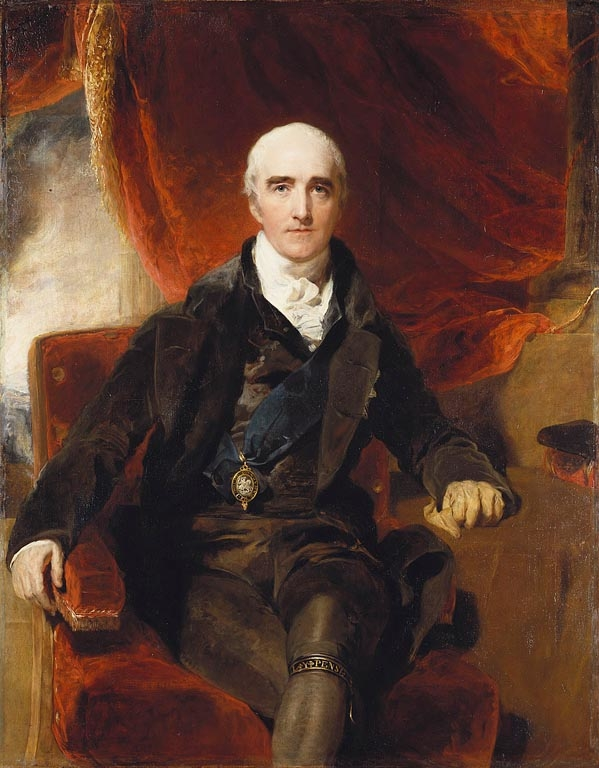
Portrait of the Marquess Wellesley by Thomas Lawrence

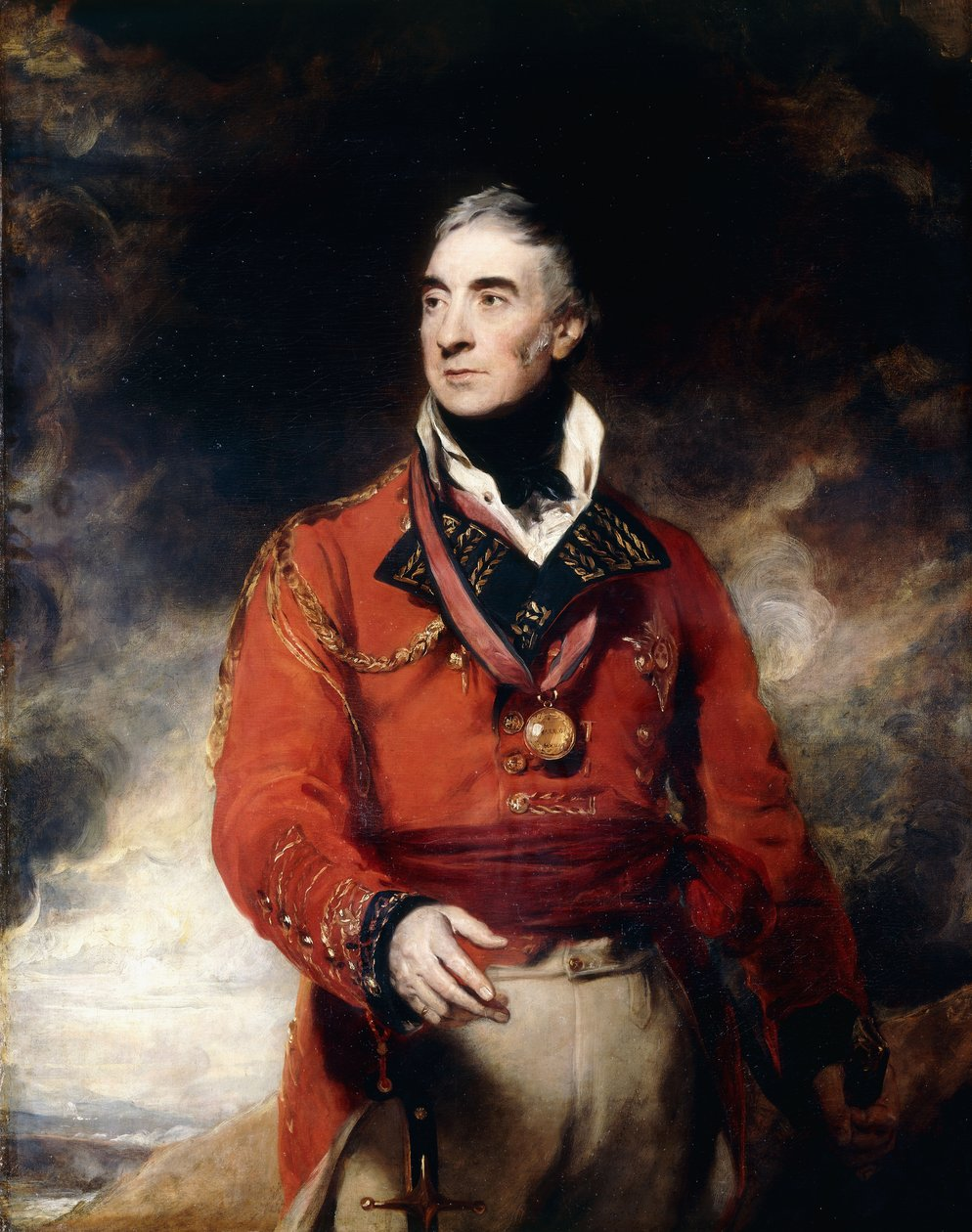
Portrait of Thomas Graham by Thomas Lawrence

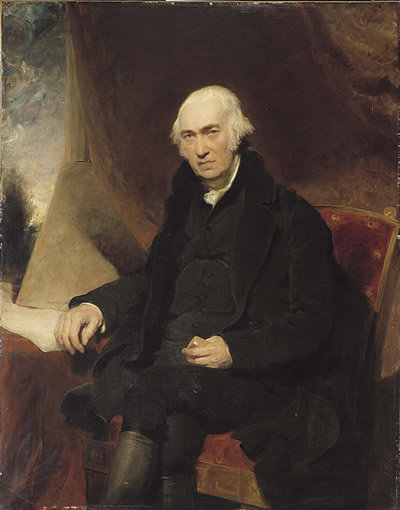
Portrait of James Watt by Thomas Lawrence

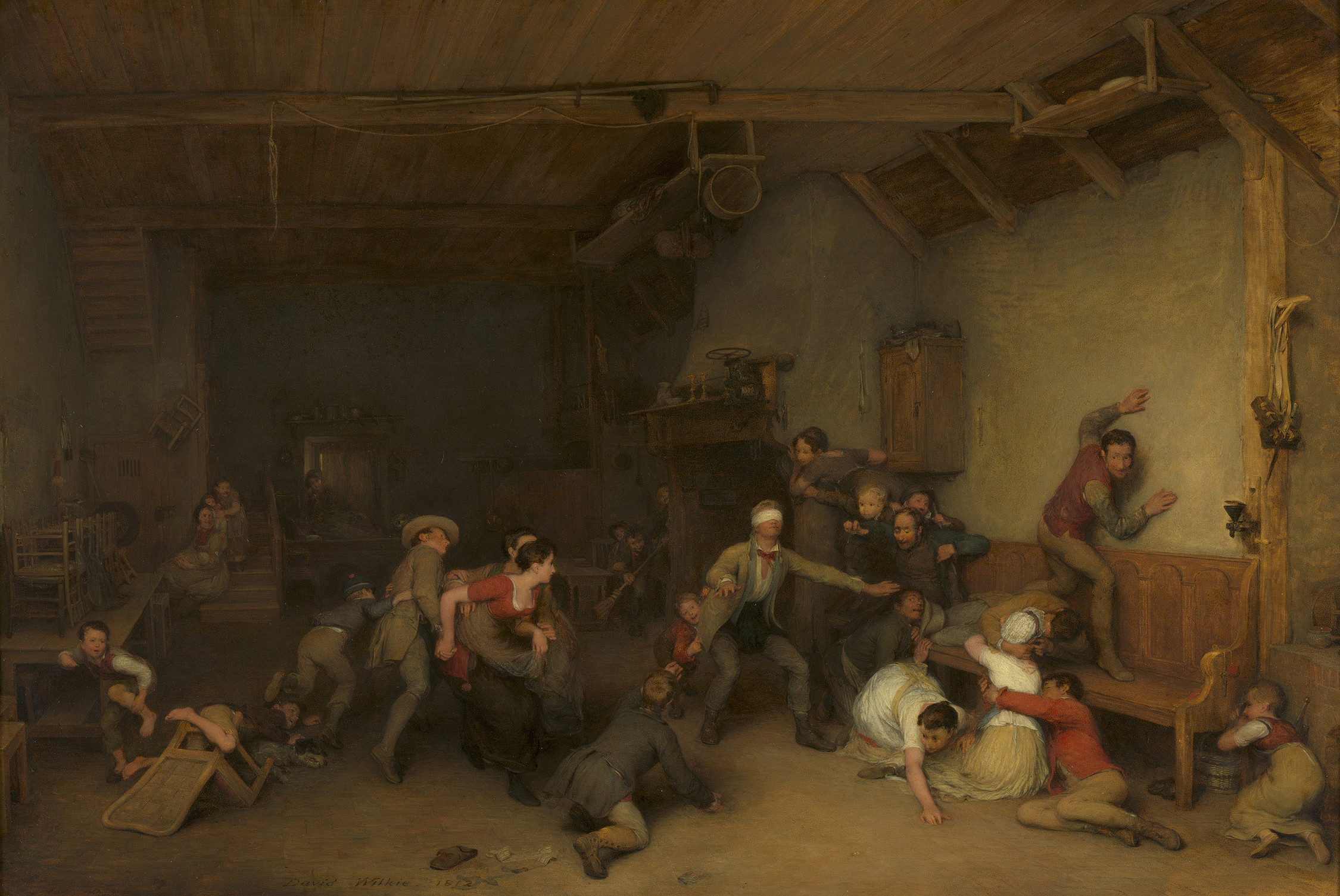
Blind-Man's Buff by David Wilkie

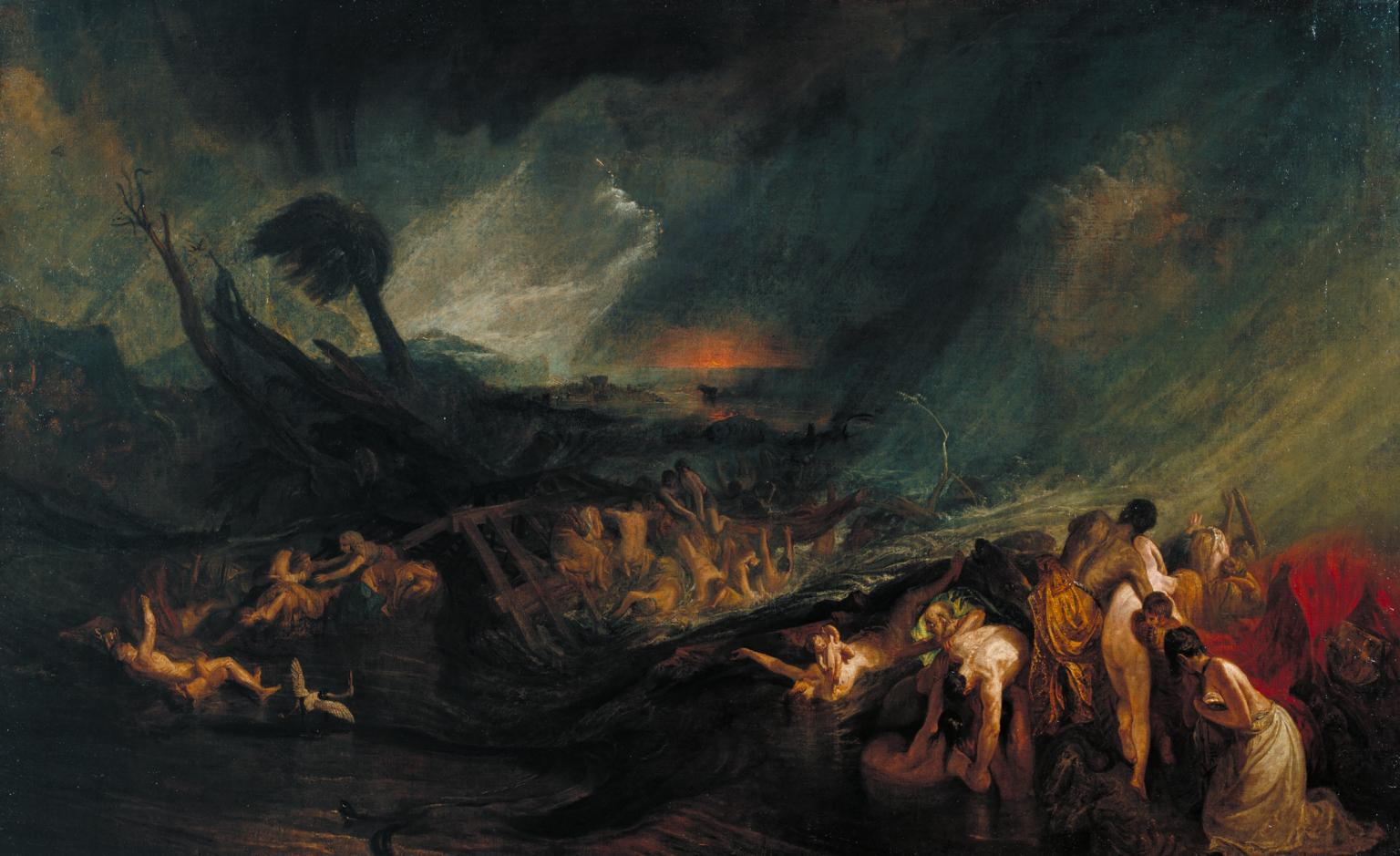
The Deluge by J.M.W. Turner

Punch by William Mulready

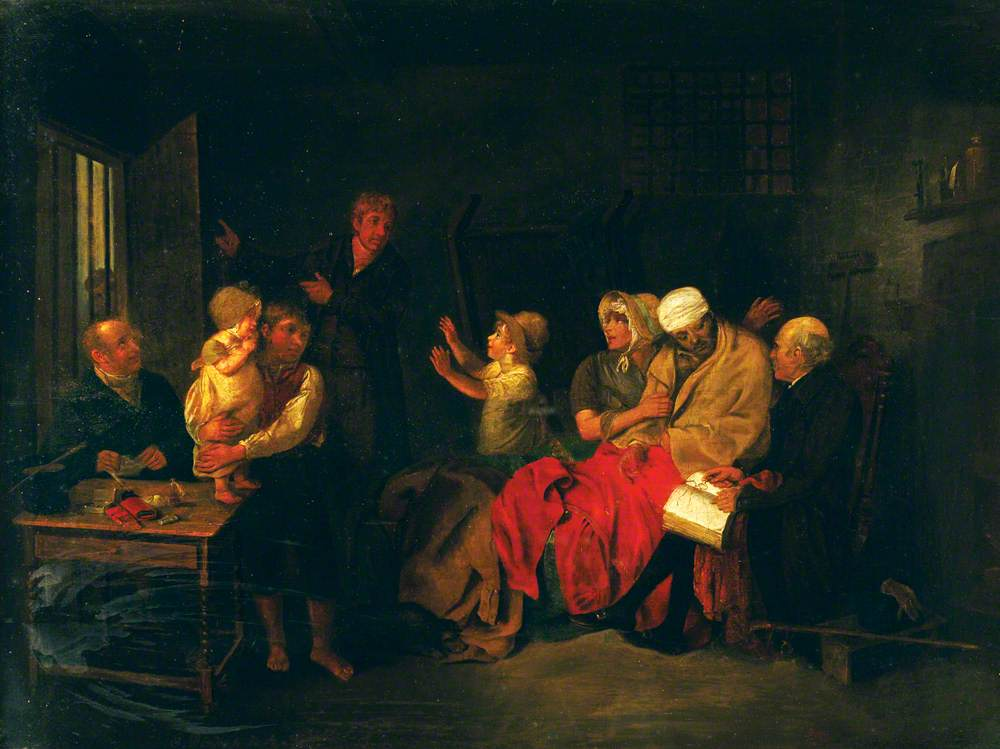
The Poacher by Edward Bird

Taking the King's Shilling, 1813 by Edward Villiers Rippingille

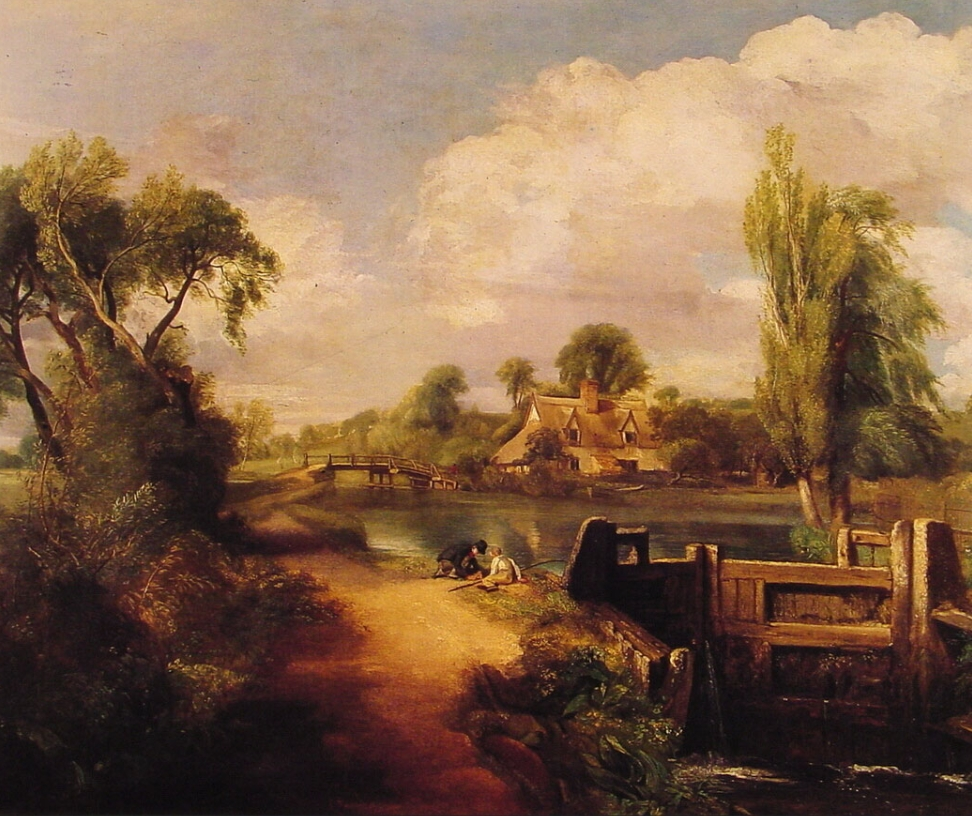
Boys Fishing by John Constable

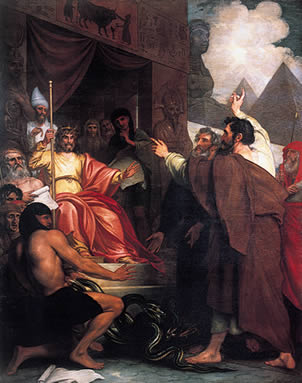
Moses and Aaron before Pharaoh by Benjamin West

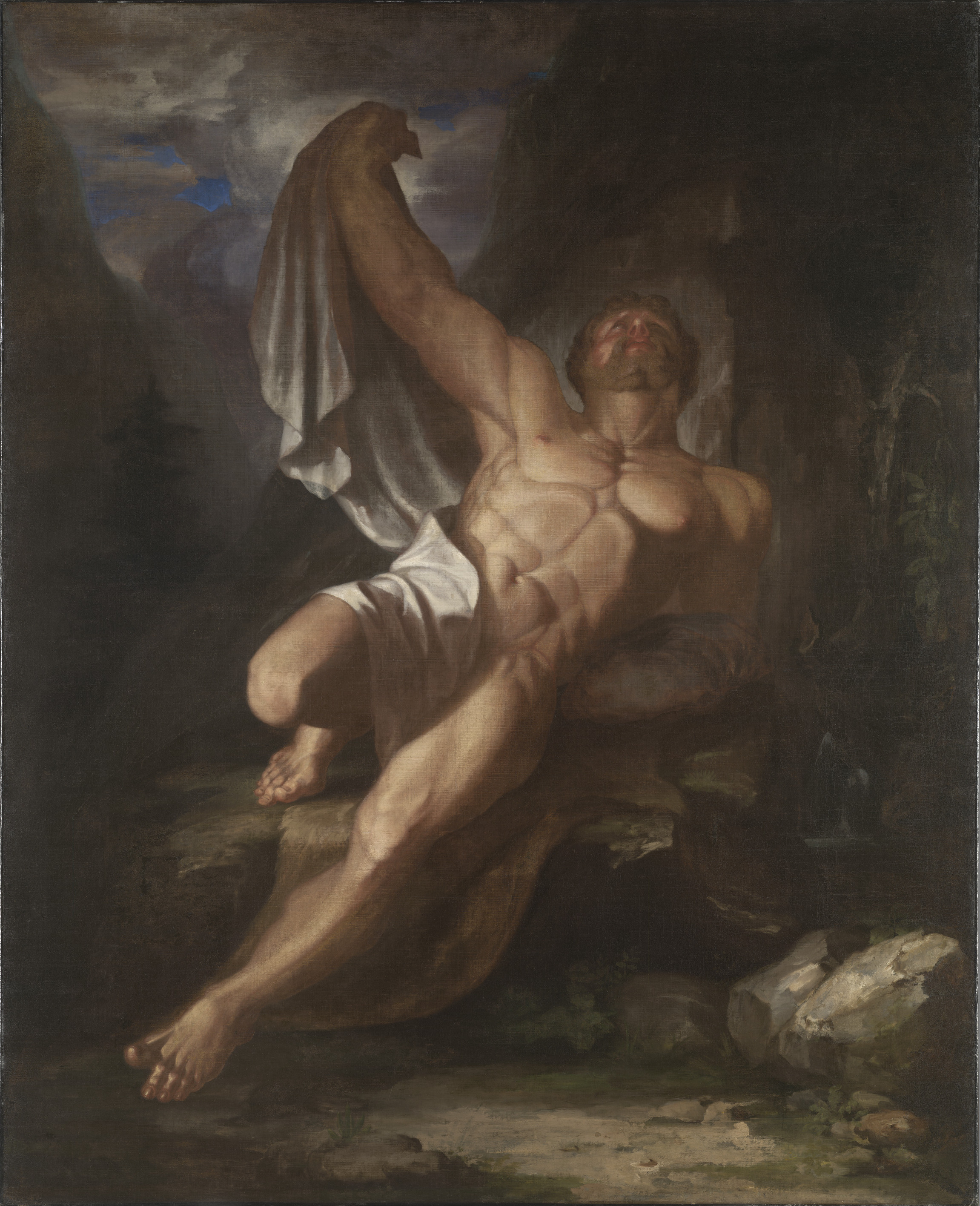
Dying Hercules by Samuel Morse

The Sale of the Pet Lamb by William Collins

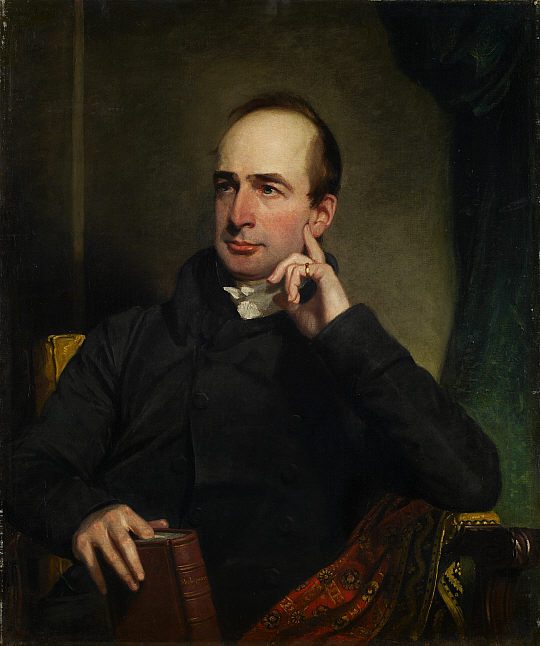
Portrait of Daniel Terry by Henry William Pickersgill

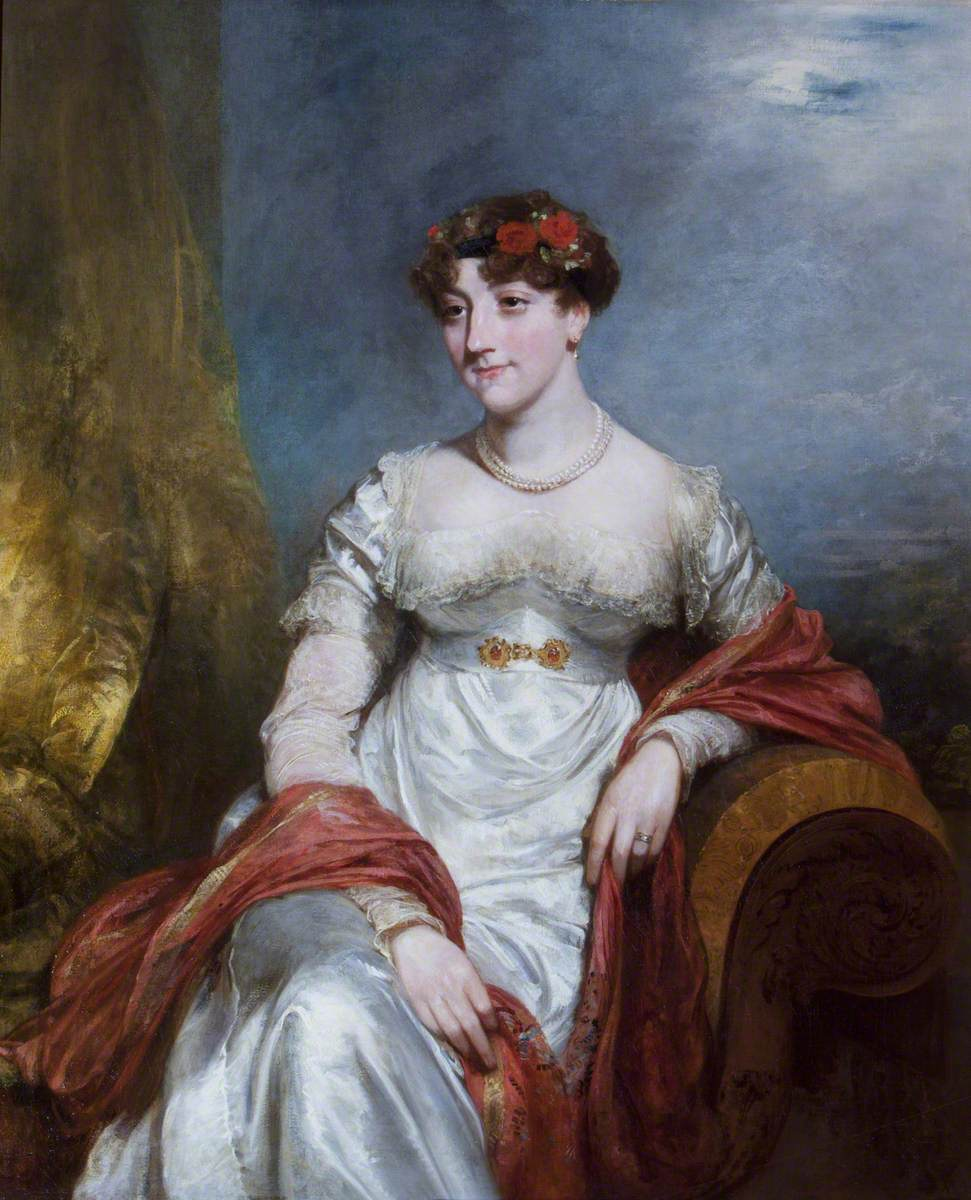
Portrait of Lady Brownlow by William Owen

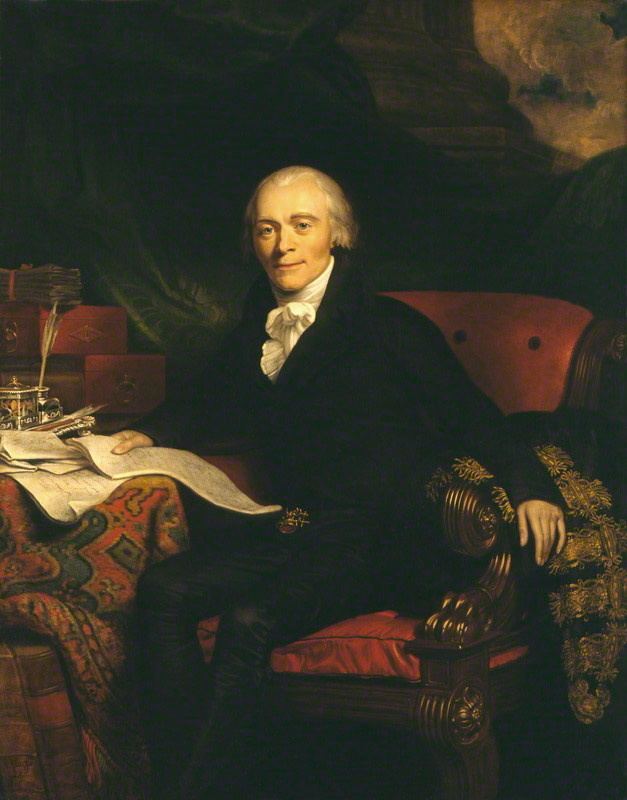
Portrait of Spencer Perceval by George Francis Joseph

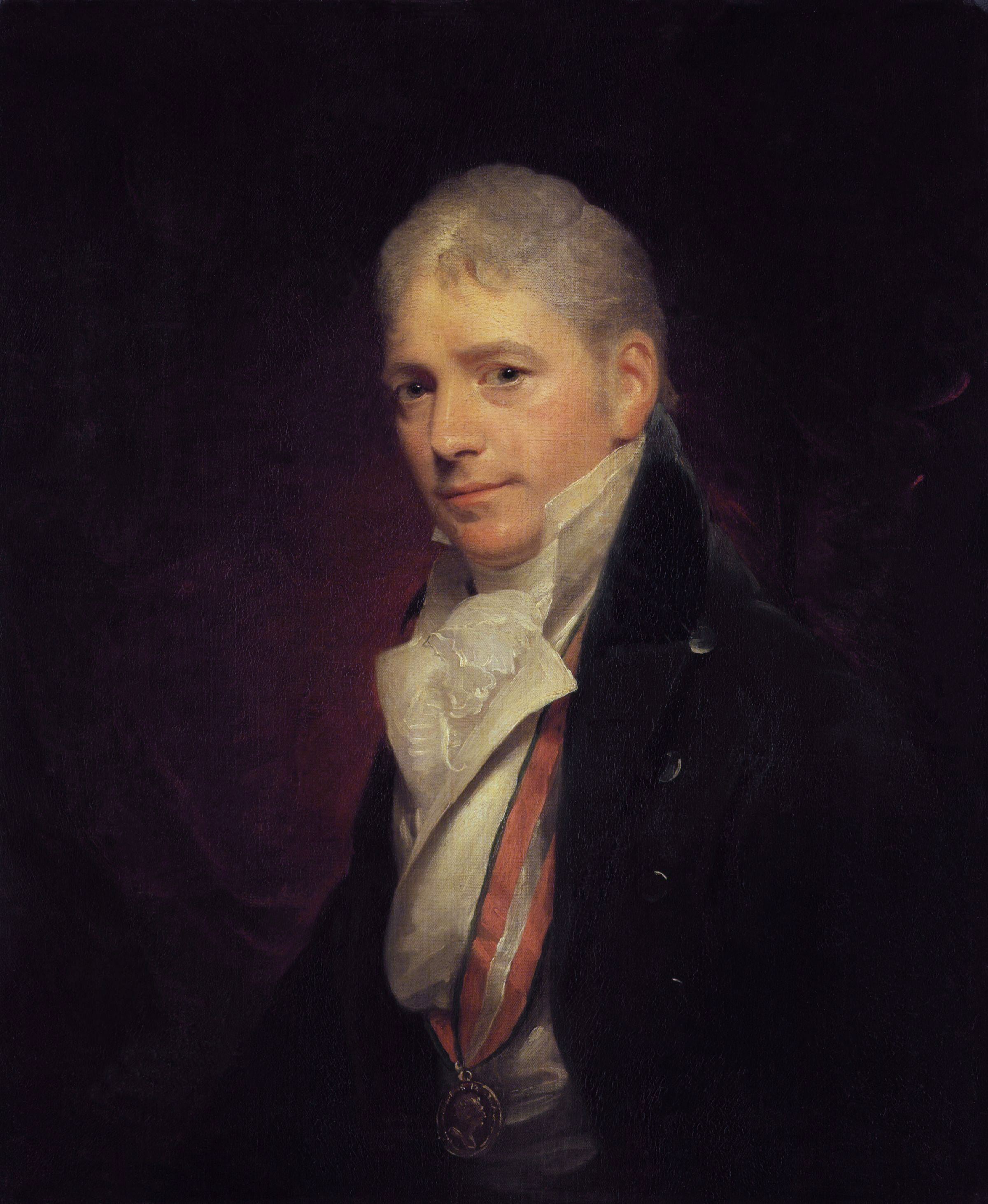
Portrait of Francis Bourgeois by William Beechey

== Bibliography ==
- Bailey, Anthony. J.M.W. Turner: Standing in the Sun. Tate Enterprises Ltd, 2013.
- Richardson, Sarah. Edward Bird, 1772-1819. Wolverhampton Art Gallery, 1982.
- Silverman, Kenneth. Lightning Man: The Accursed Life of Samuel F.B. Morse. Knopf Doubleday, 2012.
- Tromans, Nicholas. David Wilkie: The People's Painter. Edinburgh University Press, 2007.
