= Frosty Morning =

Painting by J. M. W. Turner

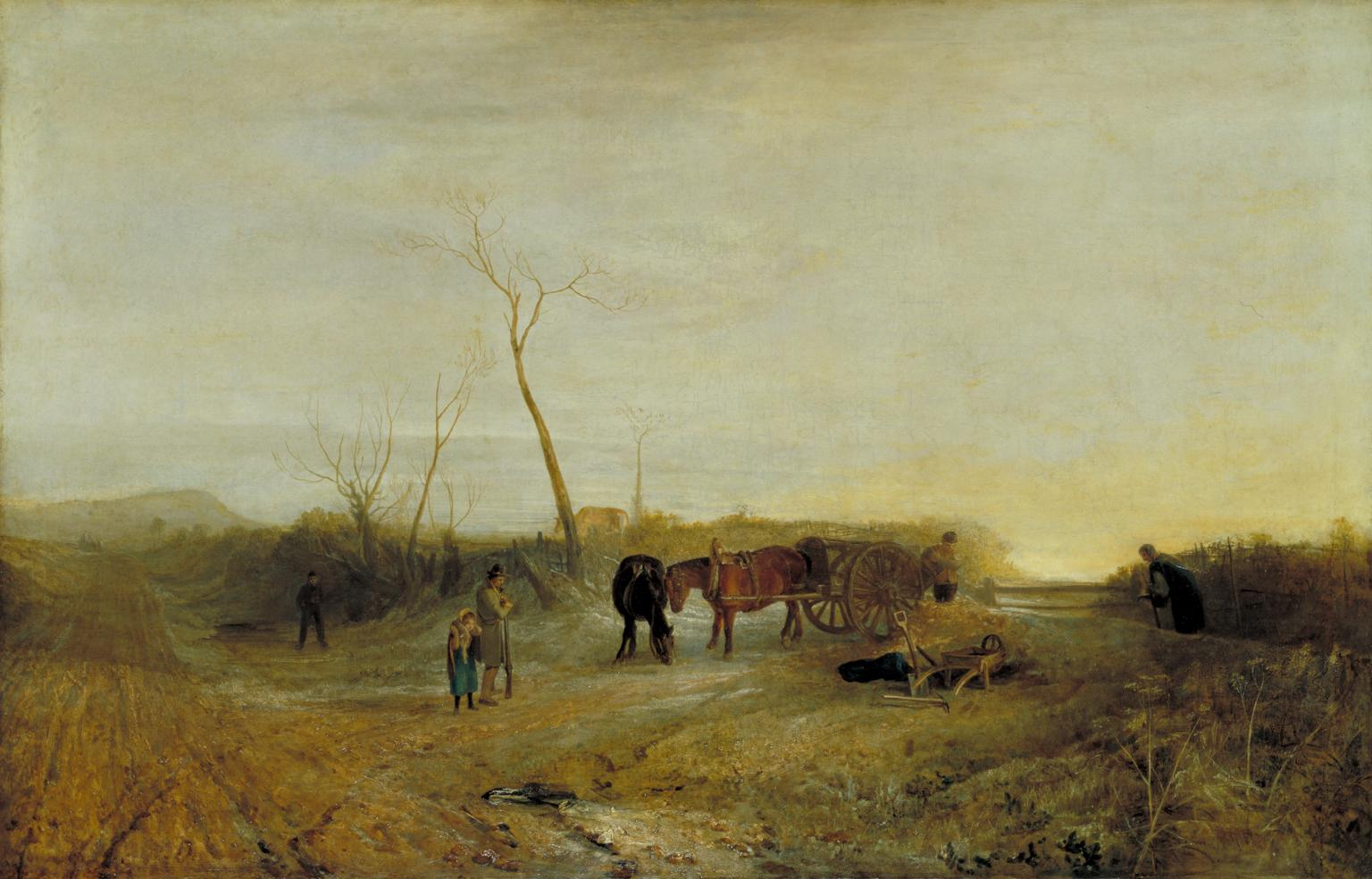
- Artist: J. M. W. Turner
- Year: 1813
- Type: Oil on canvas, landscape painting
- Dimensions: 113.5 cm × 174.5 cm (44.7 in × 68.7 in)
- Location: Tate Britain, London
- Website: www.tate.org.uk/...n00492

Frosty Morning is an 1813 landscape painting by the British artist J. M. W. Turner. Based on a sketch made when Turner was journeying to Yorkshire and the coach paused, it depicts a bright but frosty early morning in winter and group of men clearing a ditch at the side of the road.

It has been speculated that girl in the painting, with a hare stole around her shoulders, is modelled on Turner's eldest daughter Evelina. Moordy strongly disagrees: "Can it really be supposed that someone so aspirationally motivated, not to mention secretive to the point of obsession, put proof that he had an illegitimate daughter in plain sight within a canvas destined for the walls of the Royal Academy?"

The catalogue listing includes a single a line of verse, taken from James Thomson's famous poem The Seasons: The rigid hoar frost melts before his beam. The "hoar" refers to the feathery frost that forms in damp mornings.

The recent suicide of the 16 year old son of one of his best friends and patron MP Walter Fawkes may have had an effect on the choice of subject and emotion.

== Exhibitions ==
It was exhibited at the Royal Academy's Summer Exhibition of 1813 at Somerset House, where it was his most successful work that year. In 1818 Turner valued the work at 350 guineas but did not sell it. Part of the Turner Bequest of 1856, it is today in the collection of the Tate Britain.

== See also ==
- List of paintings by J. M. W. Turner

== Bibliography ==
- Bailey, Anthony. J.M.W. Turner: Standing in the Sun. Tate Enterprises Ltd, 2013.
- Hamilton, James. Turner - A Life. Sceptre, 1998.
- Reynolds, Graham. Turner. Thames & Hudson, 2022.
