= William Say (engraver) =

English engraver (1768–1834)

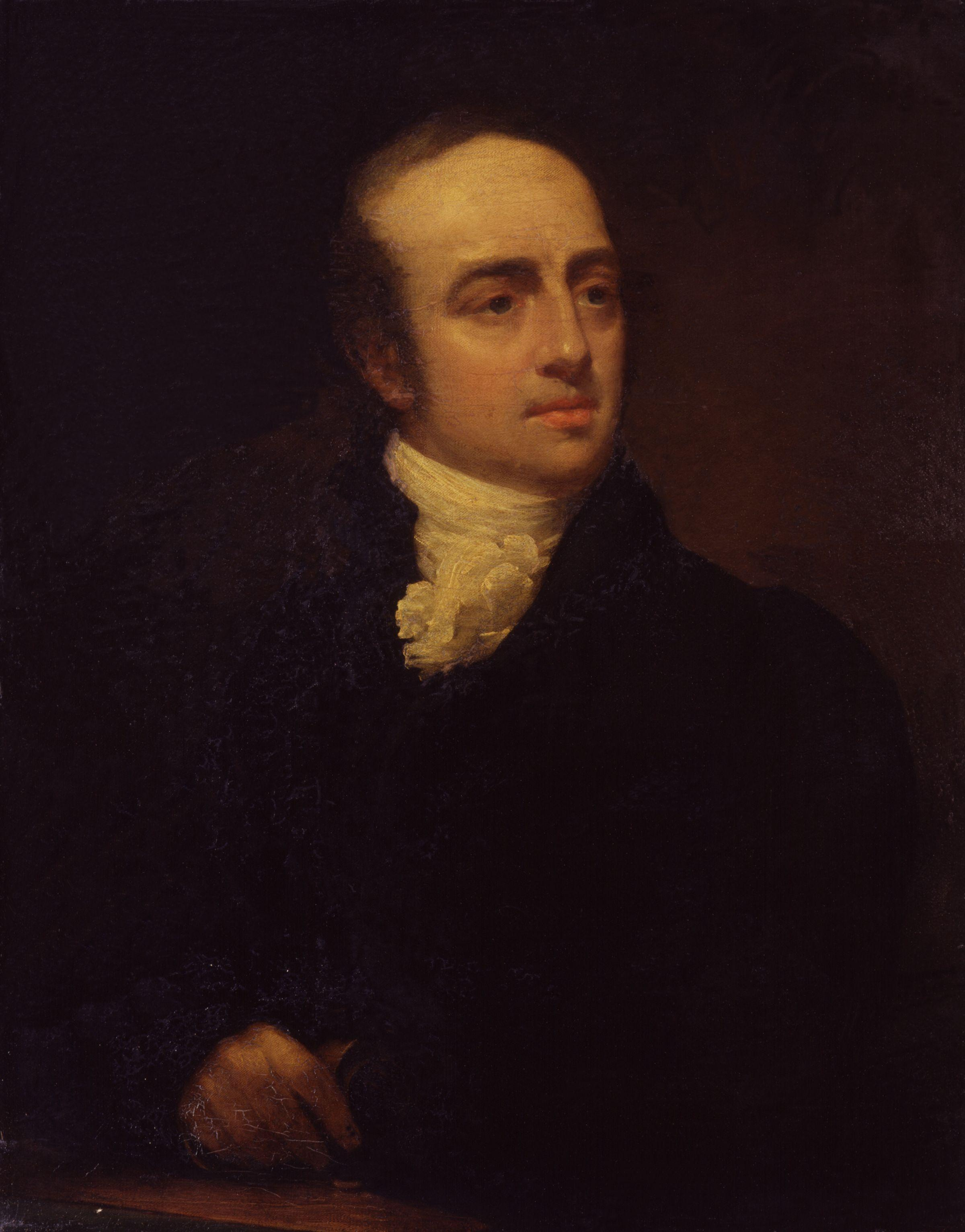
William Say, portrait by James Green.

William Say (1768–1834) was a British mezzotinter, born in Lakenham, Norfolk.

== Life ==
The son of William Say, a Norfolk land-steward, he was born at Lakenham, near Norwich. Left an orphan when five years old, he was brought up by his maternal aunt. At about the age of twenty he came to London, and obtained instruction from James Ward, who was then practising mezzotint engraving.

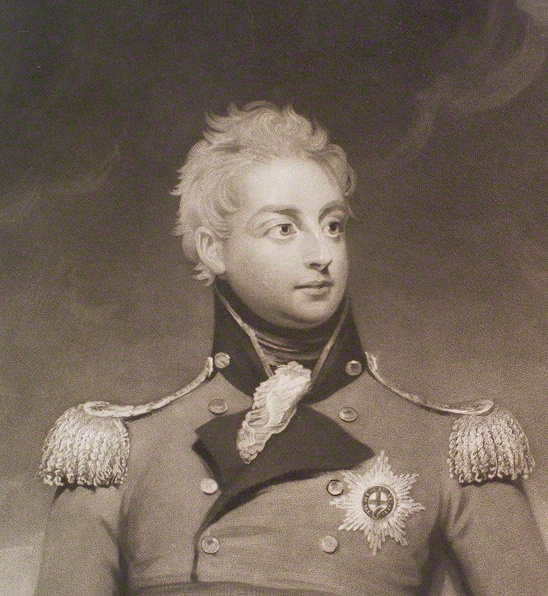
Mezzotint by Say of Prince William Frederick, Duke of Gloucester and Edinburgh, 1826.

In 1807 Say was appointed engraver to the Duke of Gloucester. He died at his residence in Weymouth Street, London, on 24 August 1834; his stock of plates and prints was sold the following July.

== Works ==
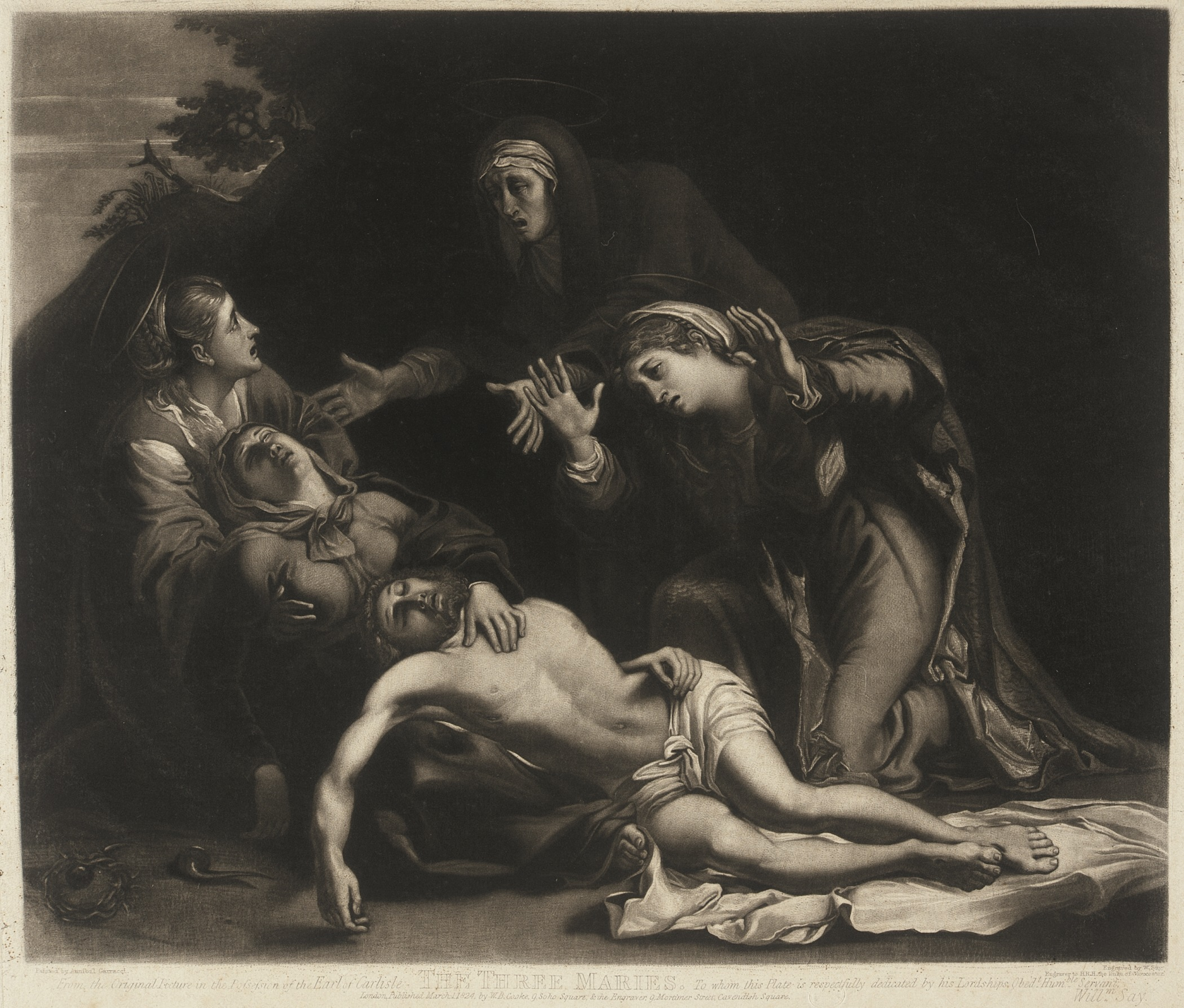
Mezzotint "Three Maries".

Say became a popular engraver, working entirely in mezzotint. Between 1801 and 1834 he executed 335 plates, a large proportion of which were portraits of contemporary celebrities, from pictures by William Beechey, John Hoppner, Thomas Lawrence, James Northcote, Joshua Reynolds, and others.

Say's subject-plates include Correggio's Holy Family with St. Catherine, Murillo's Spanish peasant boys, Raphael's Madonna di San Sisto, and William Hilton's Raising of Lazarus, He engraved one of Reynolds's two groups of members of the Dilettanti Society, and compositions by Henry Thomson, Henry Fradelle, Alfred Edward Chalon, and others.

Say was one of the engravers employed by J. M. W. Turner on his Liber Studiorum, for which he executed eleven of the published and two of the unpublished plates. He also engraved two of the plates in Turner's River Scenery of England. These, with a view of Lincoln Cathedral after Frederick Mackenzie, were his main work in landscape.

In 1820 Say scraped a small portrait of Queen Caroline after Arthur William Devis, the first attempt made in mezzotint on steel. Twelve hundred impressions were taken from the plate.

== Family ==
By his wife, Eleanor Francis, Say had one son Frederick Richard Say, and three daughters. Of these the eldest, Mary Anne, became the wife of John Buonarotti Papworth, and the youngest, Leonora, married William Adams Nicholson. An almost complete set of Say's works, in various states, was presented to the British Museum by his son in 1852.
