= Leicester and Amy Robsart at Cumnor Hall =

Painting by Edward Matthew Ward

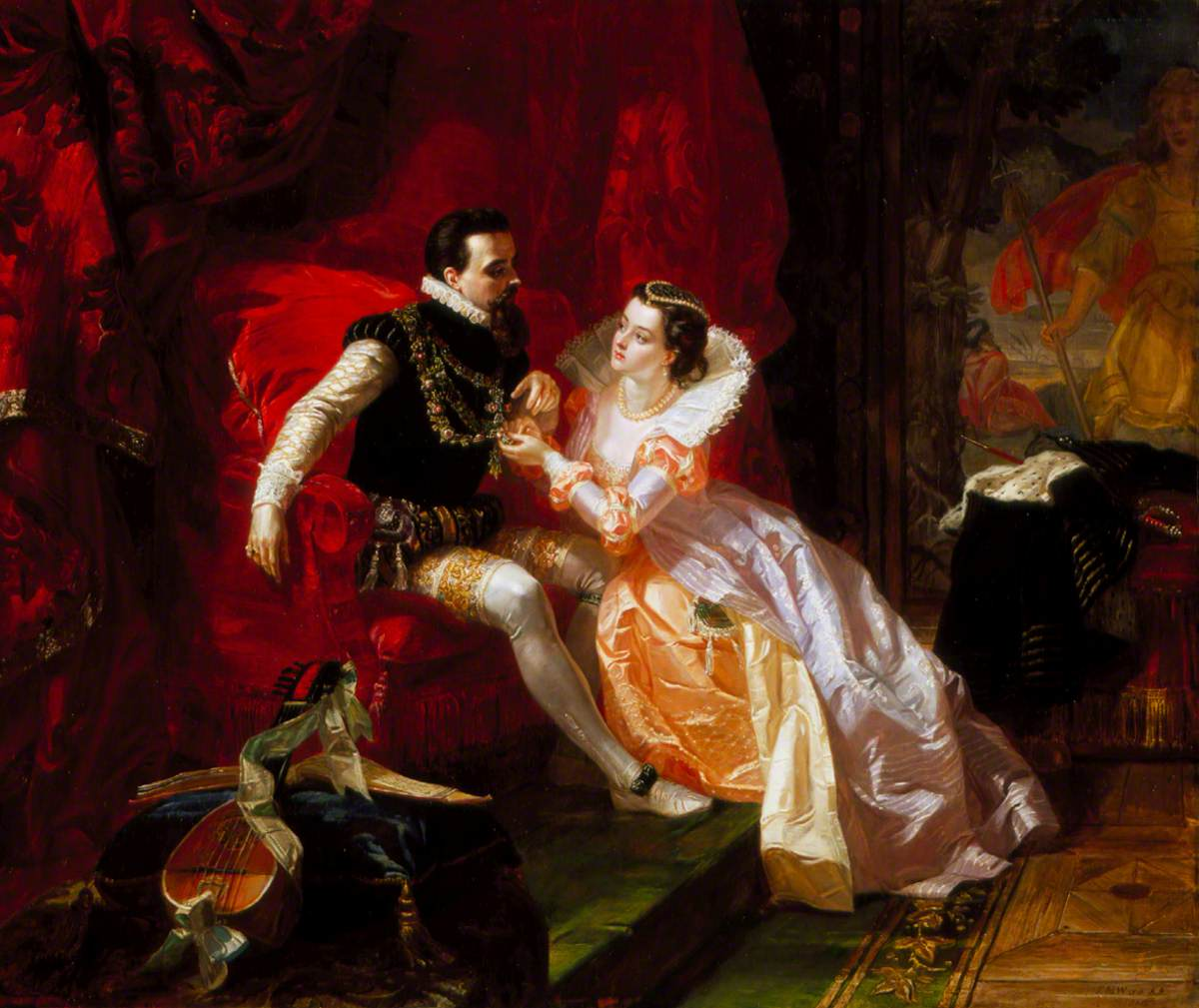
- Artist: Edward Matthew Ward
- Year: 1866
- Type: Oil on canvas, history painting
- Dimensions: 107 cm × 128.9 cm (42 in × 50.7 in)
- Location: Southampton City Art Gallery, Southampton

Leicester and Amy Robsart at Cumnor Hall is an 1866 history painting by the British artist Edward Matthew Ward. It depicts a scene from Tudor England with the aristocrat and royal favourite the Earl of Leicester and his wife Amy Robsart who he has secretly married without Elizabeth I's permission. They are shown together at Cumnor Place outside Oxford. Ward drew on Walter Scott's 1821 novel Kenilworth which focuses on their illicit romance and Robsart's mysterious death, which actually happened in 1560, three years before Lord Robert Dudley became Earl of Leicester, but which Scott rather vaguely places in the 1570s.

Ward had emerged as a member of The Clique who frequently produced scenes inspired British history and literature. The work was displayed at the Royal Academy Exhibition of 1866 held at Burlington House in London. Today it is part of the collection of the Southampton Art Gallery, which purchased it in 1934.

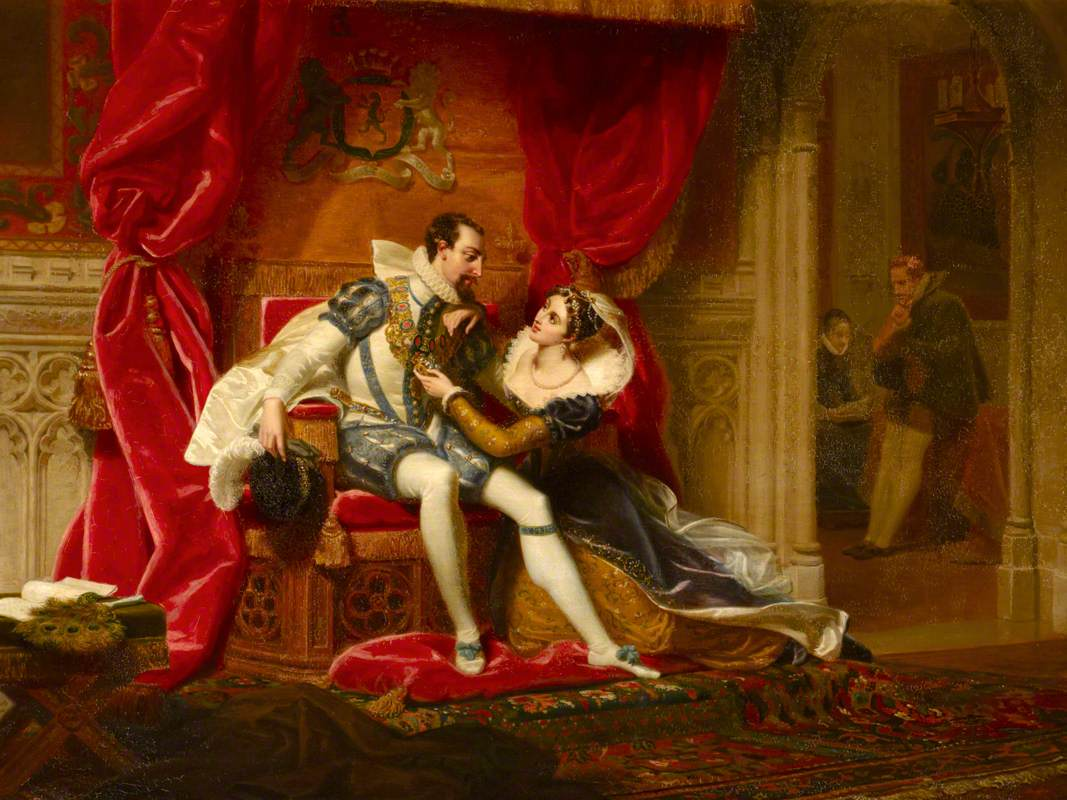
The Earl of Leicester's Visit to Amy Robsart at Cumnor Place, 1825, Henri Fradelle (1778–1865), Petworth House

The painting is rather similar in composition to an earlier painting of 1825 The Earl of Leicester's Visit to Amy Robsart at Cumnor Place, by the French painter Henri Fradelle (1778–1865), which is now at Petworth House.

== Bibliography ==
- Dafforne, James. The Life and Works of Edward Matthew Ward. Virtue and Company, 1879.
- Hosmon, Robert Stahr. The Revolt of the Pre-Raphaelites. Lowe Art Museum, 1972.
