= Hogarth Brought Before the Governor of Calais as a Spy =

Painting by William Powell Frith

- Artist: William Powell Frith
- Year: 1851
- Type: Oil on canvas, history painting
- Dimensions: 111.8 cm × 152.7 cm (44.0 in × 60.1 in)
- Location: Private Collection

Hogarth Brought Before the Governor of Calais as a Spy is an oil on canvas history painting by the British artist William Powell Frith, from 1851. It is held in a private collection.

== History and description ==
It depicts an incident from the life of the painter William Hogarth. In 1748 while visiting Calais, Hogarth was arrested by the French authorities after he was observed sketching the city gates (intrigued by the English Coat of Arms dating back to the Pale of Calais). He was accused of being a British spy, the two countries having recently been fighting the War of the Austrian Succession.

Hogarth is shown being brought before the city's governor. He seems amused with the whole incident, while he is guarded by the two soldiers, and surrounded by several women, men and even a bearded monk. At the right, a woman dressed in Breton clothing looks at him, while holding her baby. Subsequently released, he later used the visit as inspiration for his satirical painting The Gate of Calais. Frith was an admirer of the work of Hogarth. He displayed the painting at the Royal Academy Exhibition of 1851 at the National Gallery in London and sold it for 400 guineas.

== See also ==
- Hogarth's Studio in 1739, an 1863 painting by Edward Matthew Ward

== Bibliography ==
- Bills, Mark & Knight, Vivien (ed.) William Powell Frith: Painting the Victorian Age. Yale University Press, 2006
- Green, Richard & Sellars, Jane. William Powell Frith: The People's Painter. Bloomsbury, 2019.
- Junod, Karen. Writing the Lives of Painters: Biography and Artistic Identity in Britain 1760-1810. Oxford University Press, 2011.
- Wood, Christopher. William Powell Frith: A Painter and His World. Sutton Publishing, 2006.
