= Hogarth's Studio in 1739 =

Painting by Edward Matthew Ward

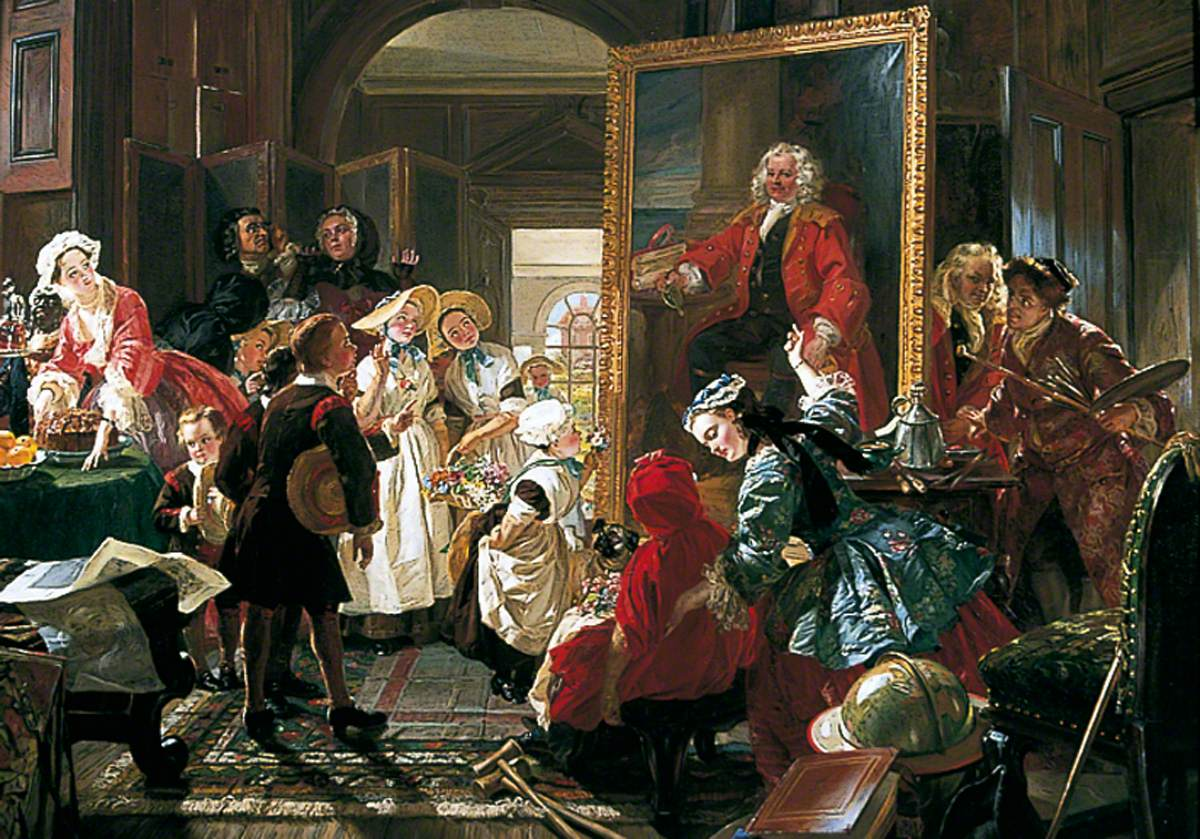
- Artist: Edward Matthew Ward
- Year: 1863
- Type: Oil on canvas, history painting
- Dimensions: 120.6 cm × 165.1 cm (47.5 in × 65.0 in)
- Location: York Art Gallery, Yorkshire

Hogarth's Studio in 1739 is an 1863 history painting by the British artist Edward Matthew Ward. It portrays the London studio of the English painter William Hogarth, then in his mid-eighteenth century heyday. Having recently completed his Portrait of Captain Thomas Coram, Hogarth and Coram hide behind the large picture as visiting children from the Foundling Hospital comment on it.

The painting was displayed at the Royal Academy's Summer Exhibition of 1863 at the National Gallery. Today it is in the collection of the York Art Gallery, having been acquired in 1882.

William Powell Frith, like Ward a member of The Clique, had previously displayed Hogarth Brought Before the Governor of Calais as a Spy at the Royal Academy Exhibition of 1851 commemorating another notable moment from Hogarth's life.

== Bibliography ==
- Hallet, Mark & Riding, Christine. Hogarth. Harry N. Abrams, 2006.
- Junod, Karen. Writing the Lives of Painters: Biography and Artistic Identity in Britain 1760–1810. Oxford University Press, 2011.
- Lambourne, Lionel. Victorian Painting. Phaidon, 1999
