= The Mermaid of Galloway =

Painting by William Hilton

- Artist: William Hilton
- Year: c.1820
- Type: Oil on canvas, history painting
- Dimensions: 125.5 cm × 100 cm (49.4 in × 39 in)
- Location: Tabley House, Cheshire

The Mermaid of Galloway is an 1820 oil painting by the British artist William Hilton. Although it reputedly takes inspiration from a folk story of the Scottish Lowlands which had been depicted in an 1810 collection by Robert Cromek, it was likely a creation of his contemporary collaborator the poet Allan Cunningham. It shows a mermaid off the coast of Galloway who has lured a young man to his death on the rocks like a siren.

The Lincoln-born Hilton was a member of the Royal Academy of Arts who enjoyed success with history paintings during thr Regency era. The picture was commissioned in 1818 by the art collector Sir John Leicester for 100 guineas. Leicester also commissioned a classical scene The Rape of Europa from Hilton which was sold to Petworth after his death in 1827.

In 1857 the painting was displayed at the Art Treasures Exhibition in Manchester. Today it hangs at Tabley House in Cheshire, the historic residence of Sir John Leicester.

== Bibliography ==
- Cannon-Brookes, Peter. Paintings from Tabley. Heim, 1989.
- Morris, Edward. Public Art Collections in North-west England: A History and Guide. Liverpool University Press, 2001.
