= Henry Thomson (painter) =

English painter

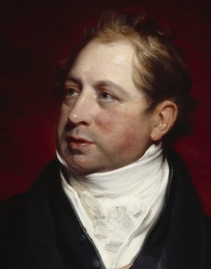
Thomson, by Sir Martin Archer Shee PRA

Henry Thomson RA (31 July 1773 – 5 April 1843) was an English artist and Royal Academician who became Keeper of the Royal Academy.

As a painter, he specialized in historical, mythological and literary subjects. He was also a translator.

== Life ==
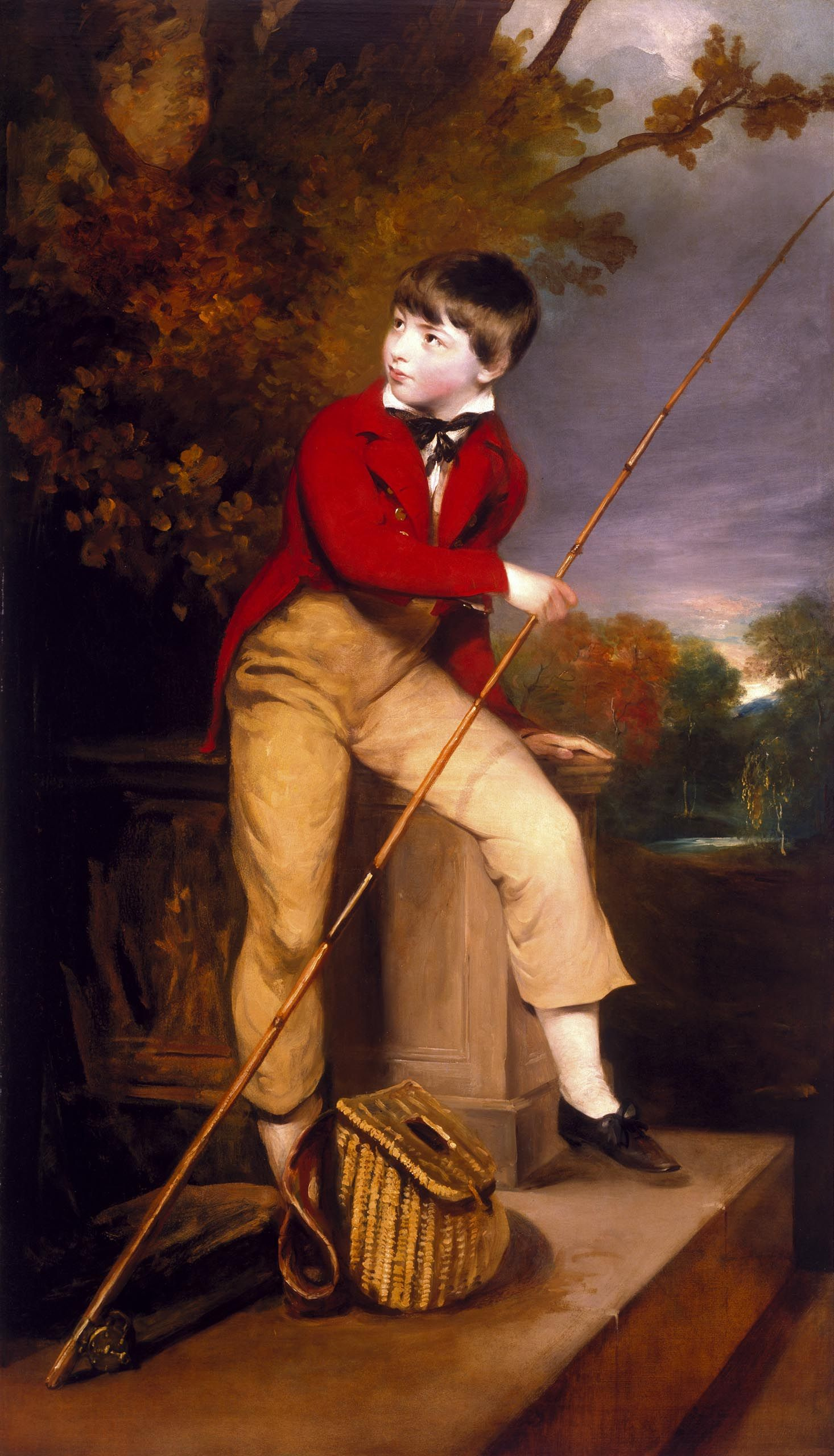
Master Roger Mainwaring by Thomson, ca. 1810

Born in Portsea, Portsmouth, Thomson was the son of a naval purser who encouraged his son's interest in art and took him to Paris in 1787. They returned to England two years later, as a result of the French Revolution. From 1791 to 1792, Thomson attended the Royal Academy Schools. He then continued to train under John Opie, before travelling again in Europe with his father. They were in Italy between 1793 and 1798, then in Austria and Germany in 1799. After his return to England later that year, Thomson's artistic career made speedy progress. In the Royal Academy exhibition of 1800 he exhibited paintings of classical subjects. The following year he was elected an associate member of the Academy and in 1804 an Academician.

Although primarily a historical painter, like most of the artists of his time Thomson relied heavily on income from illustrating books. His reputation was established in 1801–02 with his work for Boydell's Shakespeare Gallery. He exhibited many mythological and domestic paintings, and also portraits, until 1825.

He was appointed Keeper of the Royal Academy in 1825, succeeding Henry Fuseli, but after only two years he resigned on the grounds of severe illness, when he was succeeded as Keeper by William Hilton. He never recovered and took on no further significant work, retiring to Portsea and dying there on 6 April 1843. He was buried in the churchyard of the Portsmouth parish church.

By his will, he left his house, carriage, furniture, and £300 to "the person who attended him during his last illness" and £700 to each of his household servants. (Note: For most servants at this time, £700 was more than twenty years' wages.)

== Work ==
The first picture Thomson exhibited at the Royal Academy was entitled Daedalus fastening wings on his son Icarus. He specialized in "historical and fancy subjects", and between 1800 and 1825 he exhibited a total of seventy-six paintings at the Academy, most of which were portraits.

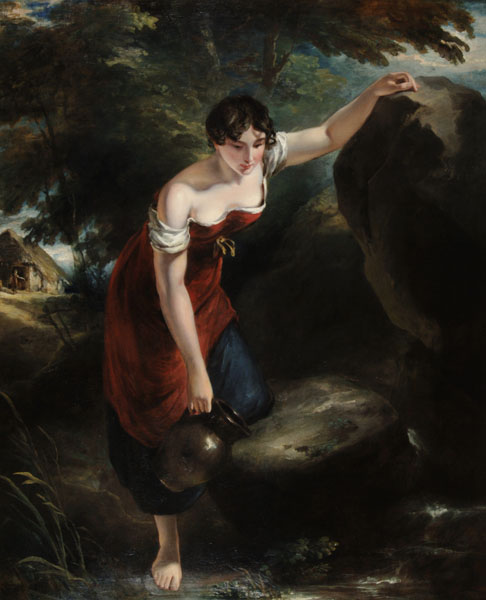
Thomson's Girl at Spring

Thomson's principal works include Mercy interceding for a fallen Warrior (1804), Love Sheltered and The Red Cross Knight (1806), Love's Ingratitude (1808), The Distressed Family (1809), Titania (1810), Peasants in a Storm (1811), The Infancy of Jupiter and Lavinia (1812), Eurydice and Thais (1814), Cupid Disarmed and Icarus (1815), Christ raising Jairus's Daughter (1820), Perdita (1824), and Juliet (1825), which was his last work to be exhibited.

Love Sheltered and The Red Cross Knight were both engraved in mezzotint, as were portraits of the Marquess of Normanby, Lord Penrhyn, Nathan Drake, Sir William Weller Pepys, Sir James Campbell, and Emily St Clare and a depiction of Titania, the last engraved by William Say and published by Richard Lambe in 1811. Thomson also illustrated Sharpe's Poets and other books.

== Translator ==
Thomson translated from the French into English Antoine-Chrysostome Quatremère de Quincy's The Destination of Works of Art and the Use to which they are Applied, published in London in 1821.

== In Literature ==
Letitia Elizabeth Landon includes a poem on Thomson's painting Juliet after the Masquerade in her Poetical Sketches of Modern Pictures in The Troubadour (1825). She wrote another different poem on this subject in conjunction with an engraving of Thomson's painting in The Literary Souvenir, 1828.

== Notes ==
Cultural offices
Preceded by Henry Fuseli	Keeper of the Royal Academy; 1825–1827	Succeeded by William Hilton
