= Napoleon in the Prison of Nice in 1794 =

Painting by Edward Matthew Ward

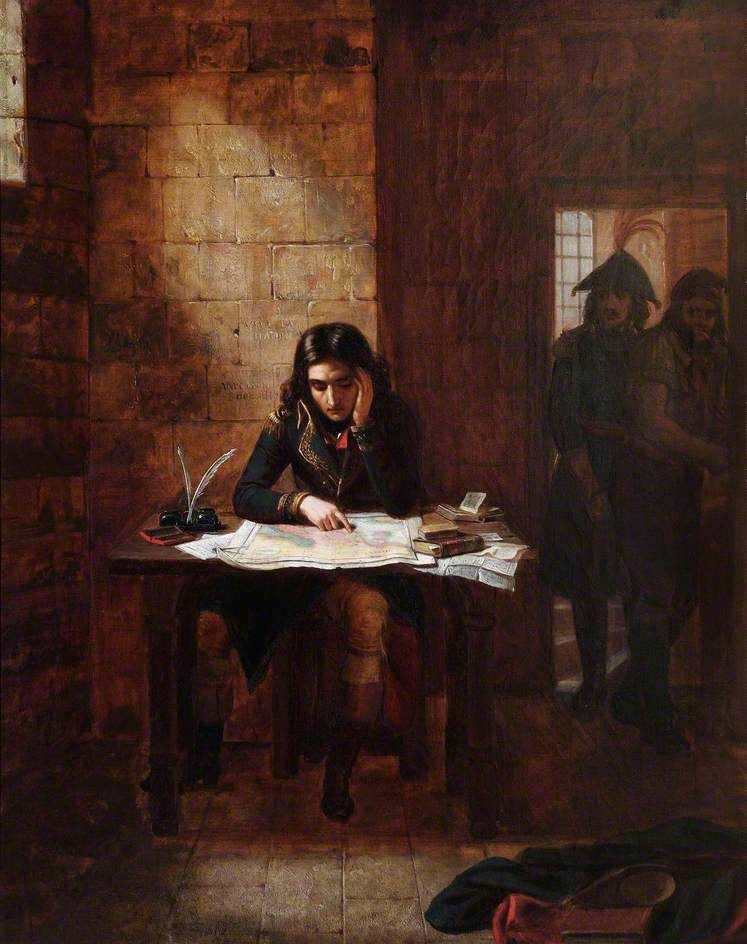
- Artist: Edward Matthew Ward
- Year: 1841
- Type: Oil on canvas, history painting
- Dimensions: 76 cm × 63.5 cm (30 in × 25.0 in)
- Location: Apsley House, London

Napoleon in the Prison of Nice in 1794 is an 1841 history painting by the British artist Edward Matthew Ward. It depicts a scene from the French Revolution when Napoleon, then a brigade general in the French Revolutionary Army, was briefly imprisoned in Nice due to his links to the recently fallen government of Maximilien Robespierre. Ward was a young artist and member of The Clique who produced a number of historical scenes during his career.

The painting was bought by the Duke of Wellington for his London residence Apsley House, one of a number of works he acquired featuring his former enemy Napoleon. It remains part of the Wellington Collection at Apsley.

An 1845 version of the painting is now in the Victoria Art Gallery, in Bath.

== Bibliography ==
- Jervis, Simon & Tomlin, Maurice. Apsley House, Wellington Museum. Victoria and Albert Museum, 1997.
- Roberts, Andrew. Napoleon and Wellington; The Battle of Waterloo and the Great Commanders who Fought it. Simon and Schuster, 2002.
