= The Last Parting of Marie Antoinette and Her Son =

Painting by Edward Matthew Ward

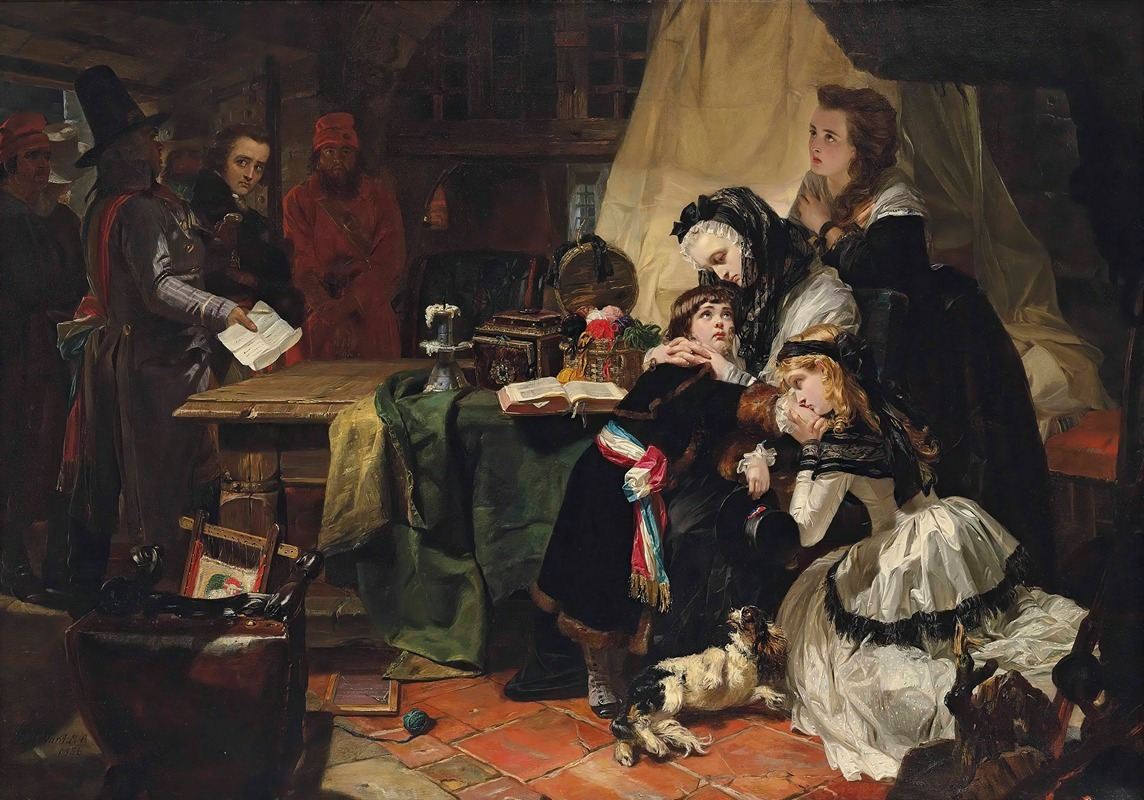
- Artist: Edward Matthew Ward
- Year: 1856
- Type: Oil on canvas, history painting
- Dimensions: 122.4 cm × 182.1 cm (48.2 in × 71.7 in)
- Location: Private collection

The Last Parting of Marie Antoinette and Her Son is an oil on canvas history painting by the British artist Edward Matthew Ward, from 1856.

== History and description ==
It features a scene from the Reign of Terror during the French Revolution when Marie Antoinette said farewell to her son Louis XVII on 3 July 1793. The seven-year old former Dauphin had been proclaimed king by French Royalists following the Execution of Louis XVI earlier that year, although the monarchy had been formally abolished by the authorities. He is shown hugging his mother as the republican officials announce to the deposed queen that her son is about to be taken away from her. Marie Antoinette would be guillotined later the same year, while Louis died in the Temple Prison in Paris at the age of ten. Also shown in the painting is his elder sister Marie Thérèse, the only one of the immediate family to survive the revolution.

Ward likely drew inspiration from a passage of an 1855 biography of the young Louis written by Alcide de Beauchesne. He was a member of The Clique, known for their depictions of historical and literary scenes and produced several popular versions of French revolutionary scenes. The painting was displayed at the Royal Academy Exhibition of 1856 held at the National Gallery in London. It was widely praised by critics with The Daily News calling it "one of the artist's greatest works" while reviewer in Bentley's Miscellany considered he had never seen "a more deeply affecting picture". It was auctioned by Christie's in 2014.

== Bibliography ==
- Dafforne, James. The Life and Works of Edward Matthew Ward. Virtue and Company, 1879.
- Hardman, Malcolm. Ruskin and Bradford: An Experiment in Victorian Cultural History. Manchester University Press, 1986.
