= Henri Jean-Baptiste Victoire Fradelle =

French painter (1778–1865)

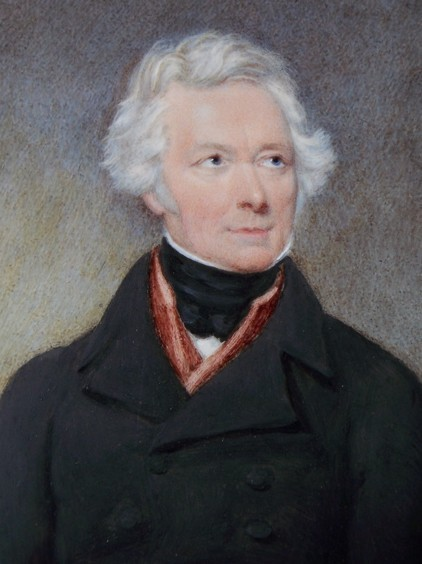
- Henri Jean-Baptiste Victoire Fradelle by Moses Haughton, 1848
- Born: 15 June 1778; Lille, France
- Died: 14 March 1865 (aged 86); London, UK
- Education: Studied under Joseph-Benoît Suvée at the École nationale supérieure des Beaux-Arts in Paris
- Known for: Painting and portraiture

Henri Jean-Baptiste Victoire Fradelle (15 June 1778 – 14 March 1865) was a Franco-English Victorian painter and portraitist, specializing in literary, historical, and religious subjects. For more than a hundred years, he was confused with his son, Henry Joseph Fradelle (1805–1872), who was trained as an artist but had several professions, including infirmary supervisor. It was only in the first decade of the 21st century that this mistake was identified and that biographies, lists, and auction houses gave Fradelle his rightful name.

== Life ==
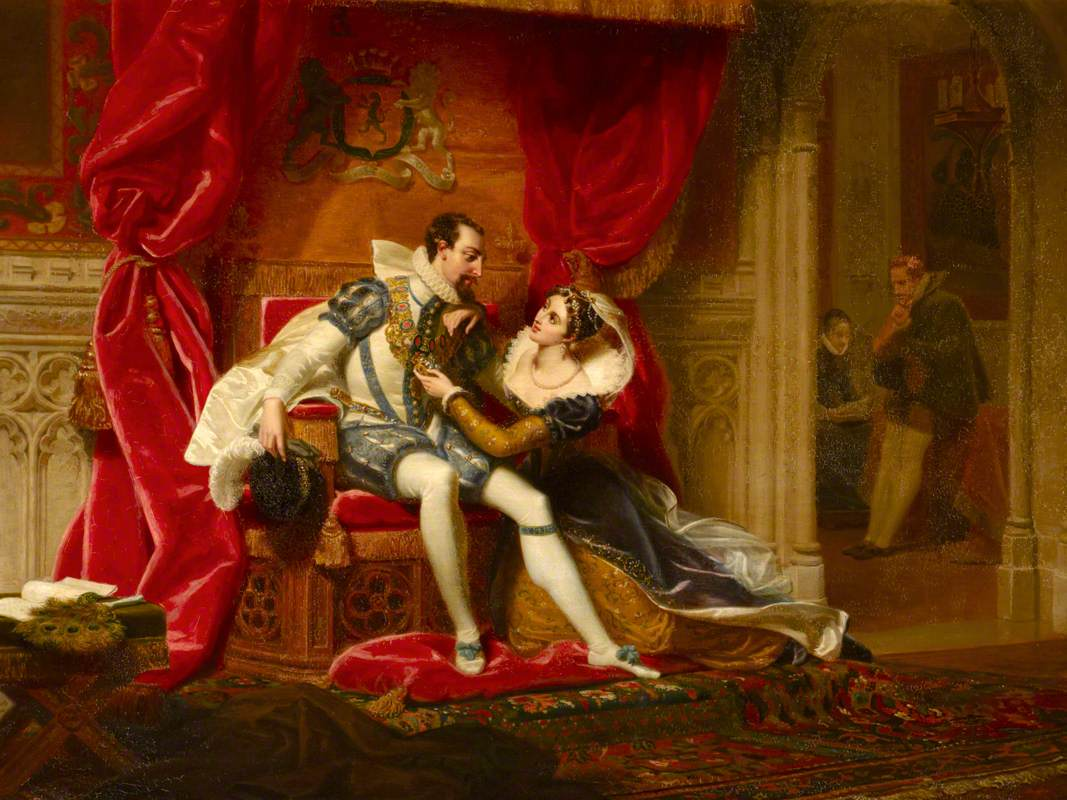
The Earl of Leicester's Visit to Amy Robsart at Cumnor Place, 1825, Petworth House, taken from Sir Walter Scott's novel Kenilworth of 1821

Fradelle was born in Lille on 15 June 1778. His father was Joseph Guillaume Fradelle, a musician, and his mother was Adelaide Geneviève Valla, both from Paris. Fradelle studied under Joseph-Benoît Suvée at the Académie royale which was to become the École nationale supérieure des Beaux-Arts in Paris. He left for Italy in 1808 and lived there until 1816. He then moved to London, which became his home, apart from a few years spent in Paris between 1830 and 1837.

Over a period of about 30 years in England, Fradelle exhibited 36 pictures at the British Institution, including The Cloister of the Carthusians at Rome Built by Michael Angelo; The Porch of St. Ambrose at Milan; Chatelar Playing the Lute to Mary Queen of Scots; Belinda at Her Toilette; The Earl of Leicester's Visit to Amy Robsart at Cumnor Place (now Petworth House); Ivanhoe, Queen Elizabeth and Lady Paget; Origin of Painting; Souvenirs d'Italie—Il Sospiro, an Italian Dance; and Othello and Desdemona.

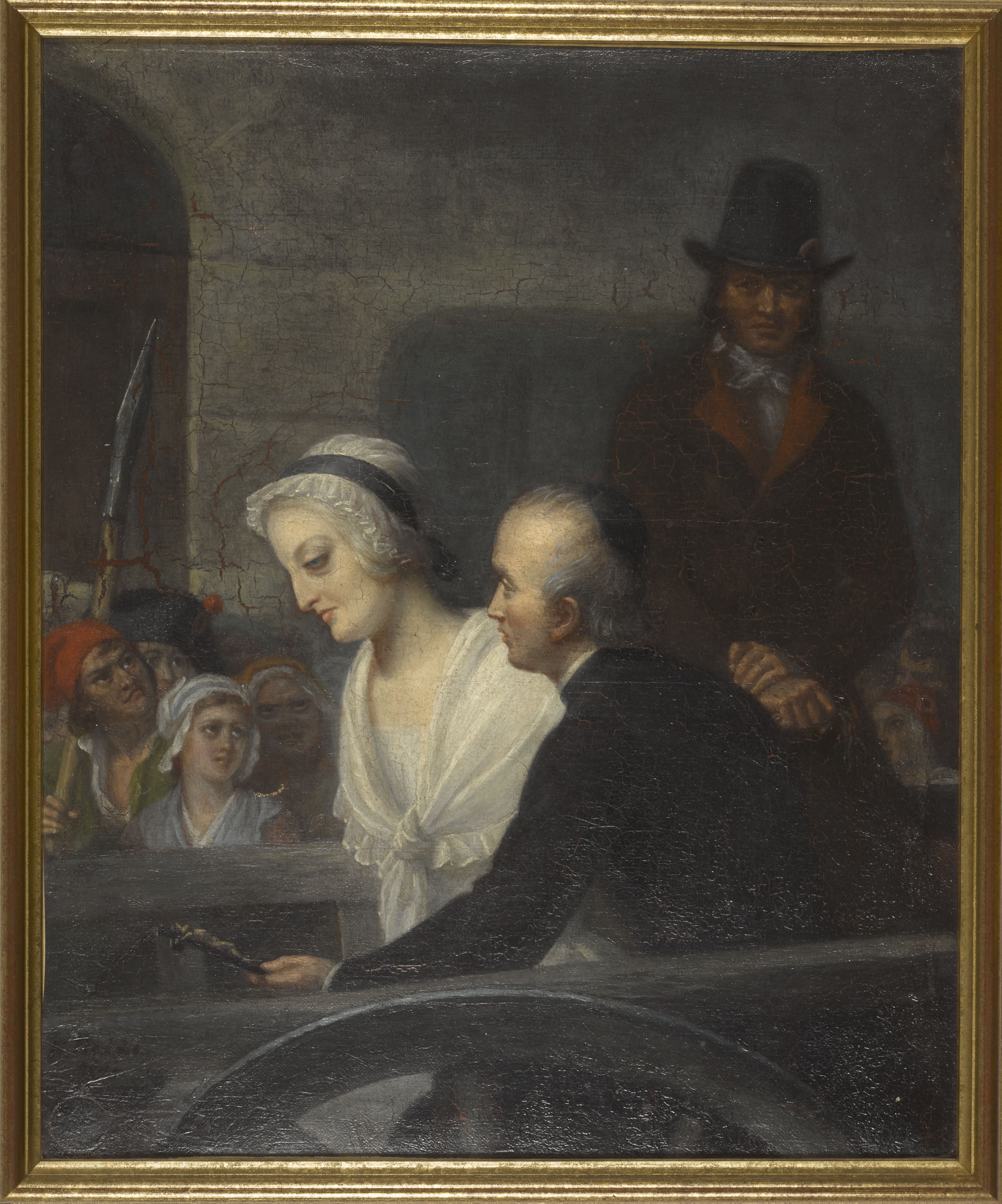
Marie Antoinette on her way to the guillotine

Fradelle also exhibited 11 works at the Royal Academy Summer Exhibition, including Milton Dictating Paradise Lost to His Daughter, The Death of Adelaide, Othello Relating the Story of His Life to Brabantio and Desdemona (now Royal Shakespeare Theatre, Stratford), and Olivia and Viola. In addition, he presented works at the Royal Society of British Artists, the Old Water-Colour Society, and the Paris Salon. Fradelle also painted and exhibited portraits, such as those of Mrs. Jeffery, Mr. Thomas H. Johnston, Captain Basset, R.A., and Miss Stephens as Susanna in Marriage of Figaro.

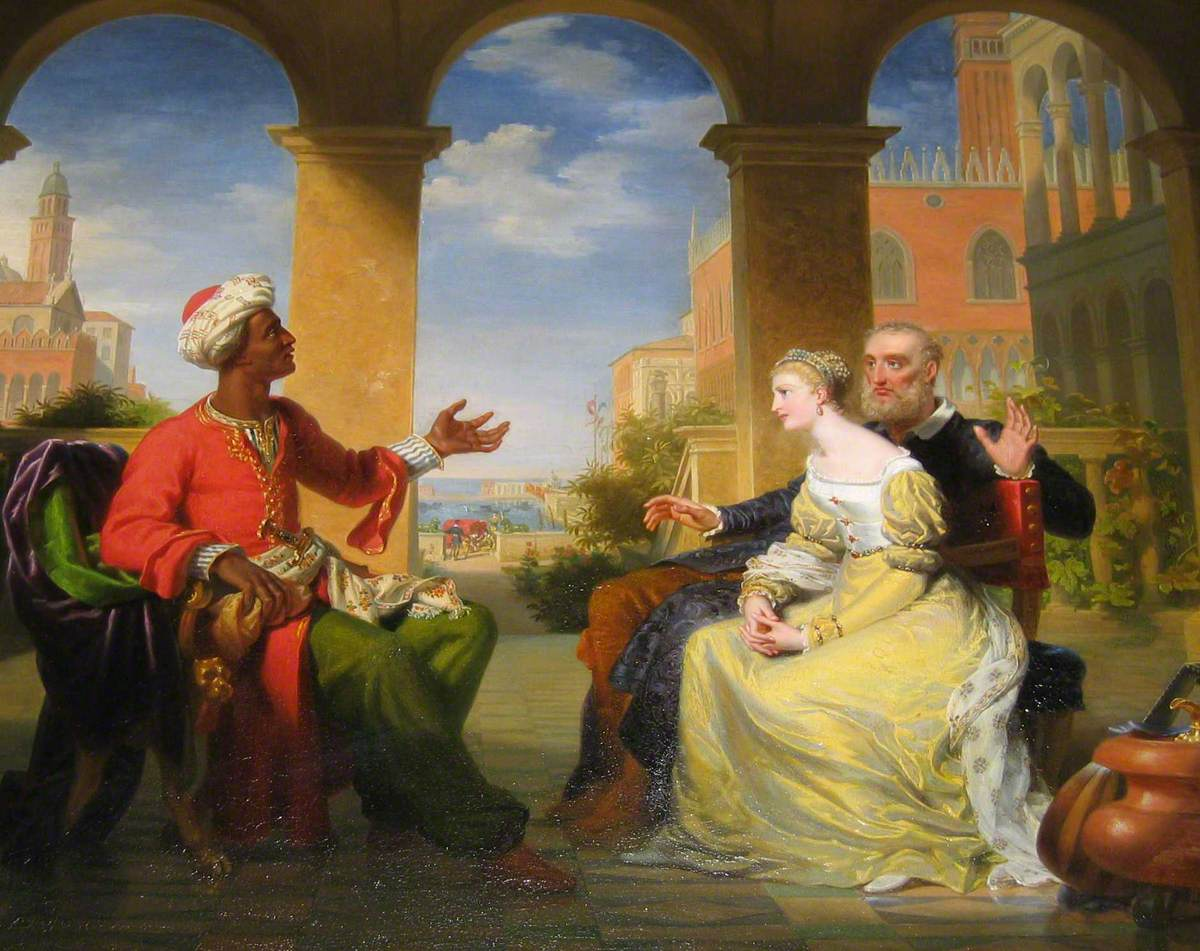
'Othello', Act I, Scene 3, Othello Relating His Life Story to Desdemona, 1823-24, Royal Shakespeare Theatre, Stratford

Fradelle died at 36 Weymouth Street, Portland Place, London, on 14 March 1865 and is buried at Kensal Green Cemetery. He was 86.

== Works ==
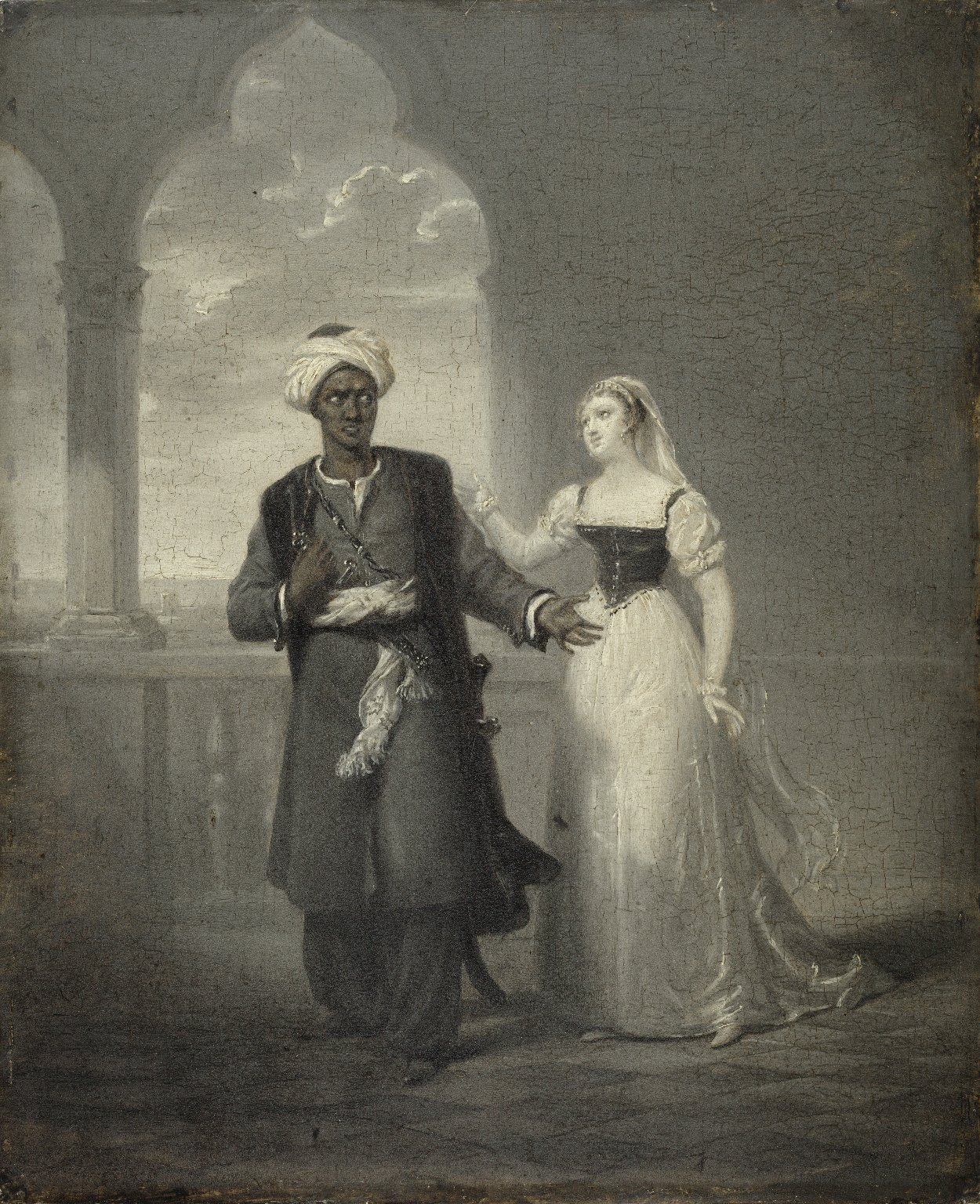
Othello and Desdemona, c. 1827, monochrome oils, Folger Shakespeare Library

Fradelle's works were bought by such notables as Lord Holland (Holland House), the Earl of Egremont (Petworth House), Lord Northwick, Wynn Ellis, J. Marshall of Leeds, and the Duke of Leuchtenberg of Munich. The Earl of Leicester's Visit to Amy Robsart at Cumnor Place is exhibited at Petworth House (the preparatory drawing for the latter is in the British Museum, London), and Fradelle's Othello Relating the Story of His Life to Brabantio and Desdemona is now part of the Royal Shakespeare Company Collection in Stratford upon Avon. Drawings by Fradelle can be found at the Musée des Beaux-Arts in Bordeaux, France.

Many of Fradelle's works were engraved by artists such as Charles Turner (for example, The Earl of Leicester's Visit to Amy Robsart at Cumnor Place), William Say (Queen Elizabeth and Lady Paget and Belinda at Her Toilette, as well as The Interview Between Lady Jane Grey and Dr. Roger Ascham), R. Smart (Princess Elizabeth at Woodstock), J. Jazet (Chatelar Playing the Lute to Mary Queen of Scots), V. Rogers and A. Duncan (both of whom engraved Mary Queen of Scots and Her Secretary Chatelar), and U. Denis (Belinda at Her Toilette). Some of the engravings can be found at the National Portrait Gallery and the Courtauld Institute of Art in London and the Bibliothèque Nationale in Paris.

Manuscript letters by Fradelle to Baron Darnay, Mr and Mrs Ogle, and Mrs Herving are at the Princeton University Library and at the Getty Research Institute in Los Angeles.

In recent years, paintings by Fradelle have been sold by Lawsons (Sydney), Bonhams (London), Ritchies (Toronto), Christies (London) and Bart Wouters Kunsthandel (Brasschaat, Belgium), among others. The paintings concerned are Queen Elizabeth and Lady Paget; Interior Scene Depicting a Shakespearian Man Reciting Poetry to a Lady; Origin of Painting; Milton Dictating Paradise Lost to His Daughter; A Dance in La Campagna; Portrait of a Lady in a Blue Dress Playing the Harp, a Landscape Beyond; and Scene from Othello.
