= William Hilton (painter) =

British portrait painter (1786–1839)

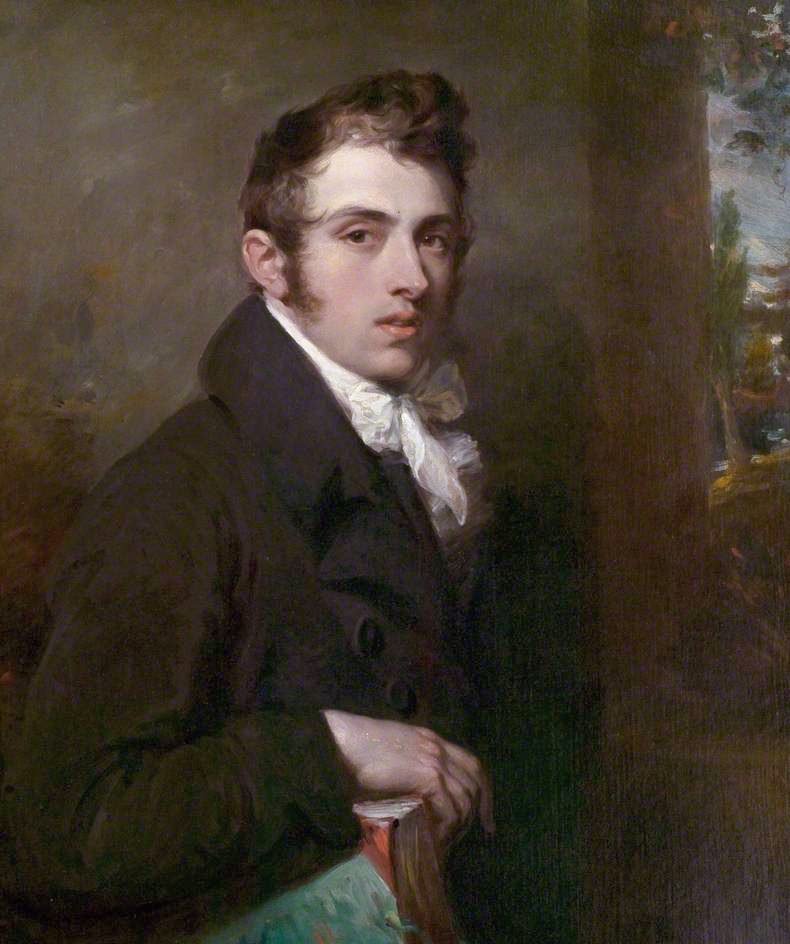
- Self-portrait
- Born: 3 June 1786; Lincoln, Great Britain
- Died: 30 December 1839 (aged 53); London, United Kingdom
- Known for: History painting, portaits

William Hilton RA (3 June 1786 – 30 December 1839) was a British portrait and history painter. He is also known as "William Hilton the Younger".

== Life and work ==
William Hilton was born in the gatehouse of the Vicar's Court in The Close, Lincoln, England, a son of Mary and William Hilton (1752–1822). His father, a native of Newark, was a portrait painter and scenery painter for Mr and Mrs James Edward Miller and later Thomas Shaftoe Robertson's theatre companies. William was baptised at the church of St Mary le Wigford, Lincoln. William initially worked with his father. The company toured the Lincoln Theatre Circuit, and young William was encouraged by theatre proprietor Fanny Robertson to pursue a career as an artist. After he rose to become a Royal Academician he painted her. She retired to live near the Georgian Theatre (now Angles Theatre in Wisbech), and his painting of Fanny in the role of "Beatrice" was in 1866 in the nearby Wisbech Working Men's Institute.

Although he is best known today for simple portraits of the poets John Keats and John Clare, he was successful in his lifetime with huge history paintings in the "Grand Manner", which have not benefited from the revival of interest in 19th-century British Academic art, and are unlikely to be on display in the museums that own them.

In 1800, Hilton was apprenticed to the engraver John Raphael Smith, and around the same time enrolled at the Royal Academy Schools. Another apprentice from 1802 was Peter De Wint; they were inseparable friends and lived together in Broad Street, Golden Square. De Wint married William's only sister Harriett. De Wint visited Hilton's home in Up-Hill, Lincoln and painted many of his charming landscapes in the district. In Lincoln cathedral is a cenotaph erected by Mrs De Wint in memory of the two artists – De Wint her husband, and Hilton, her brother. Hilton first exhibited at the Royal Academy in 1803, sending a Group of Banditti, and soon established a reputation for choice of subject and qualities of design and colour superior to the great mass of his contemporaries. He made a tour in Italy with Thomas Phillips, the portraitist.

In 1813, having exhibited "Miranda and Ferdinand with the Logs of Wood", he was elected as an associate of the Academy, and in 1820 as a full academician; his diploma-picture representing Ganymede. In 1823, he produced "Christ crowned with Thorns", a large and important work regarded as his masterpiece, subsequently bought as the first purchase of the Chantrey Fund in 1878. In 1827 he succeeded Henry Thomson as Keeper of the Royal Academy. Two of his works were bought by the British Institution for churches for £525 and £1050, but the failure of "Edith finding the Body of Harold" (1834) to make more than £200 marked the end of the taste for such works. Hilton may be compared with Benjamin Haydon, though he was always more successful.

In 1828 he was awarded the Freedom of Lincoln.

He died in London on 30 December 1839. He was buried in the family grave in the Savoy Chapel (destroyed by fire on 7 July 1864). The chapel was restored in 1866 and Mrs De Wint placed a beautiful font in the edifice. Close by a tablet bears the words: 'This font was presented to the Chapel Royal of the Savoy by Harriet De Wint, in place of a Monument previously erected to the memory of her brother William Hilton R.A. her husband Peter de Wint, and other members of her family, whose remains are interred in the adjoining cemetery. The Monument was destroyed by the fire, July VII., MDCCCLXIV. May this tribute be long preserved to the glory of God'.

In Lincoln Cathedral, a Cenotaph to the joint memory of her husband and brother was erected by Mrs De Wint. The following year an engraving by Charles Wass, of a portrait in chalk of Keats by Hilton was used in The Poetical works of John Keats published by Taylor and Walton, London (1840).

In 1921 the artist's great-niece Harriet Helen Tatlock (1848–1921) bequeathed a canvas by his father William Hilton snr, and five of the son's pictures, including a self portrait (exhibited in the National Portrait Exhibition of 1868) to the Lincoln City and County Museum.

Some of his best-regarded pictures include "Angel releasing Peter from Prison" (life-size), painted in 1831, "Una with the Lion entering Corceca's Cave" (1832), the "Murder of the Innocents", his last exhibited work (1838), "Comus" and "Amphitrite". The Tate Gallery now owns "Edith finding the Body of Harold" (1834), "Cupid Disarmed, Rebecca and Abraham's Servant" (1829), "Nature blowing Bubbles for her Children" (1821), and "Sir Calepine rescuing Serena" (from The Faerie Queene) (1831). In the National Portrait Gallery is his likeness of John Keats, with whom he was acquainted.

== Notable works ==
- Murder of the Innocents, his last exhibited work, 1838.
- Edith finding the Body of Harold, 1834.
- Venus in Search of Cupid Surprises Diana (Before 1820), Wallace Collection, London.
- Hebe
- Rape of Ganumede, 1806, Royal Academy of Art Collection, London
- Cupid and the Nymphs, 1830, Royal Academy of Art Collection, London
- Rape of Proserpine
- Una and Satyrs, Lincolnshire County Council art collection.
- Phaeton, c 1820, Manchester Art Gallery.
- John Clare, portrait, 1820, National Portrait Gallery, London
- John Keats, portrait, c1822, National Portrait Gallery, London
- Diana at the Bath c. 1820, Tate Gallery, London
- Nature Blowing Bubbles for her Children exhibited 1821, Tate Gallery, London
- Cupid and Nymph exhibited 1828, Tate Gallery, London
- Sir Calepine Rescuing Serena exhibited 1831, Tate Gallery, London
- Rebecca and Abraham's Servant at the Well exhibited 1833, Tate Gallery, London
- Editha and the Monks Searching for the Body of Harold 1834, Tate Gallery, London

== Gallery ==
The Mermaid of Galloway, 1820

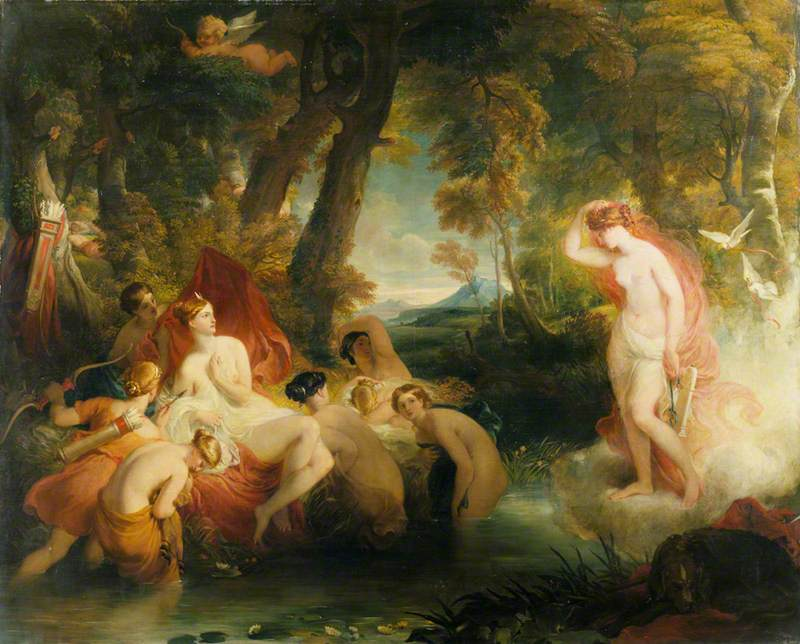
Venus in Search of Cupid Surprises Diana, 1820

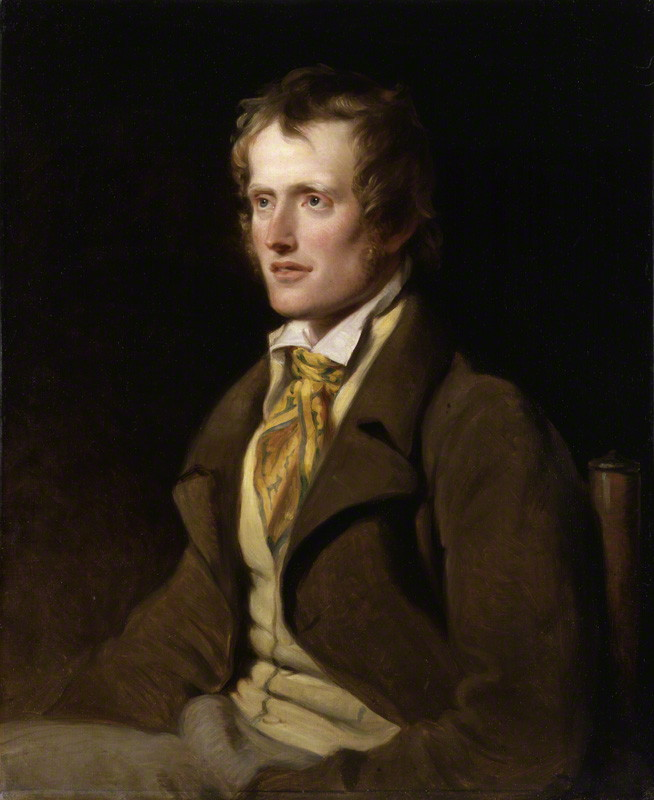
Portrait of John Clare, 1820

Rebecca and Abraham's Servant at the Well, 1833

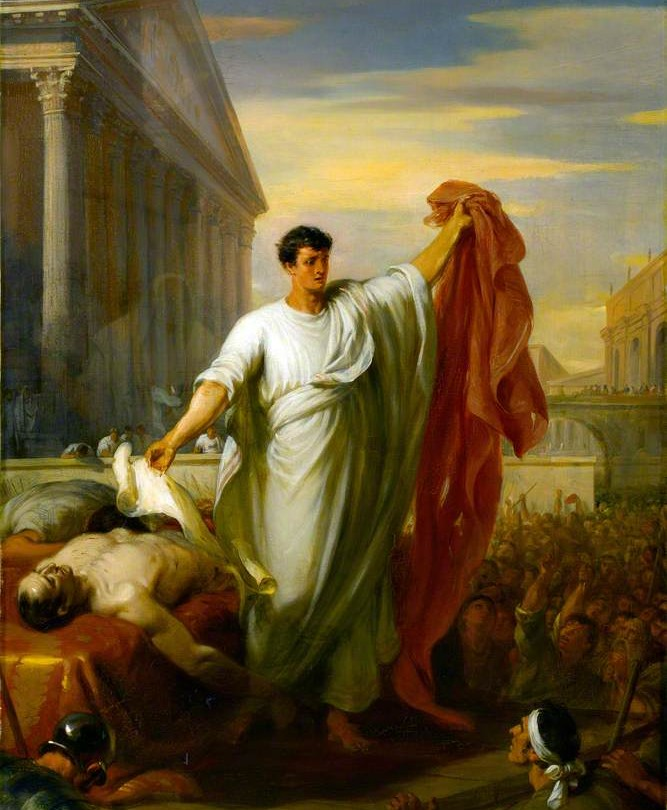
Marc Antony Reading the Will of Caesar, 1834
